= Timeline of the American Old West =

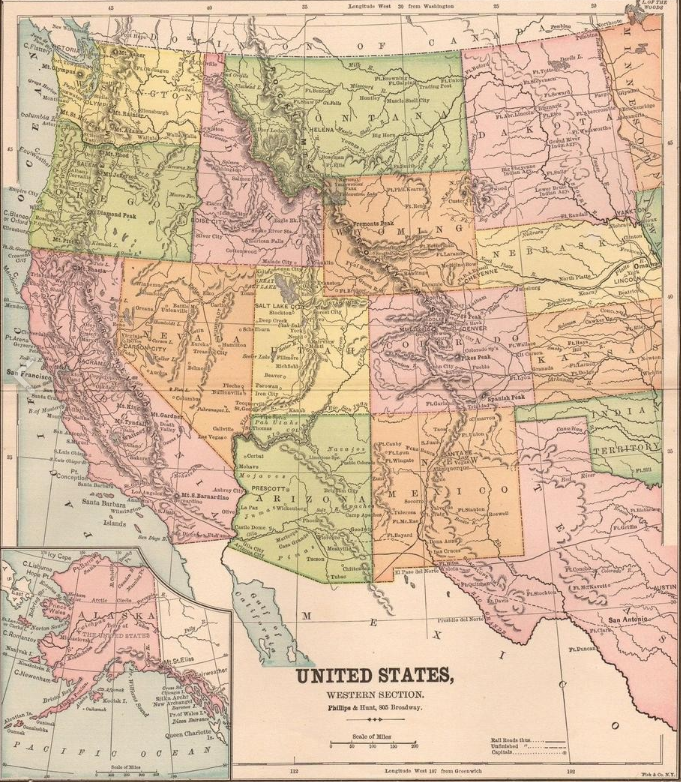
1882 hand-colored map depicting the western half of the continental United States

This timeline of the American Old West is a chronologically ordered list of events significant to the development of the American West as a region of the continental United States. The term "American Old West" refers to a vast geographical area and lengthy time period of imprecise boundaries, and historians' definitions vary. The events in this timeline occurred primarily in the portion of the modern continental United States west of the Mississippi River, and mostly in the period between the Louisiana Purchase in 1803 and the admission of the last western territories as states in 1912 where most of the frontier was already settled and became urbanized; a few typical frontier episodes happened after that, such as the admission of Alaska into the Union in 1959. A brief section summarizing early exploration and settlement prior to 1803 is included to provide a foundation for later developments. Rarely, events significant to the history of the West but which occurred within the modern boundaries of Canada and Mexico are included as well.

Western North America was inhabited for millennia by various groups of Native Americans and later served as a frontier to the Spanish Empire, which began colonizing the region starting in the 16th century. British, French, and Russian claims followed in the 18th and 19th centuries, though these did not result in settlement and the region remained in Spanish hands. After the American Revolution, the newly independent United States began securing its own frontier from the Appalachian Mountains westward for settlement and economic investment by American pioneers. The long history of American expansion into these lands has played a central role in shaping American culture, iconography, and the modern national identity, and remains a popular topic for study by scholars and historians.

Events listed below are notable developments for the region as a whole, not just for a particular state or smaller subdivision of the region; as historians Hine and Faragher put it, they "tell the story of the creation and defense of communities, the use of the lands, the development of markets, and the formation of states.... It is a tale of conquest, but also one of survival, persistence, and the merging of peoples and cultures."

== Early exploration and settlement ==
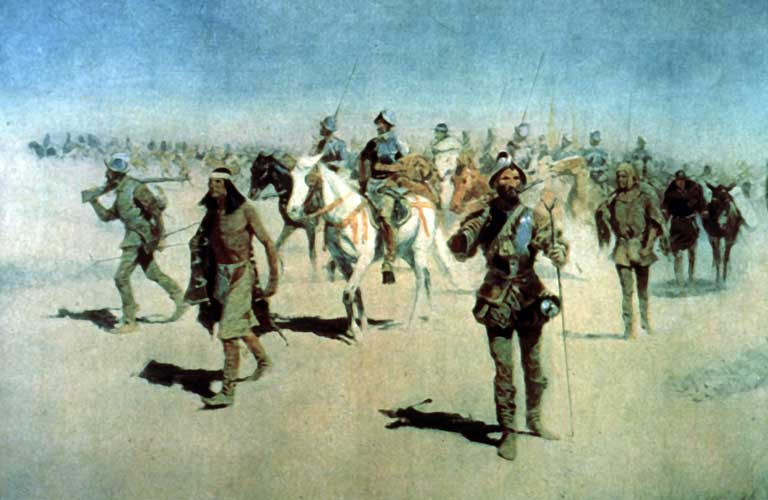
Coronado Sets Out to the North by American artist Frederic Remington

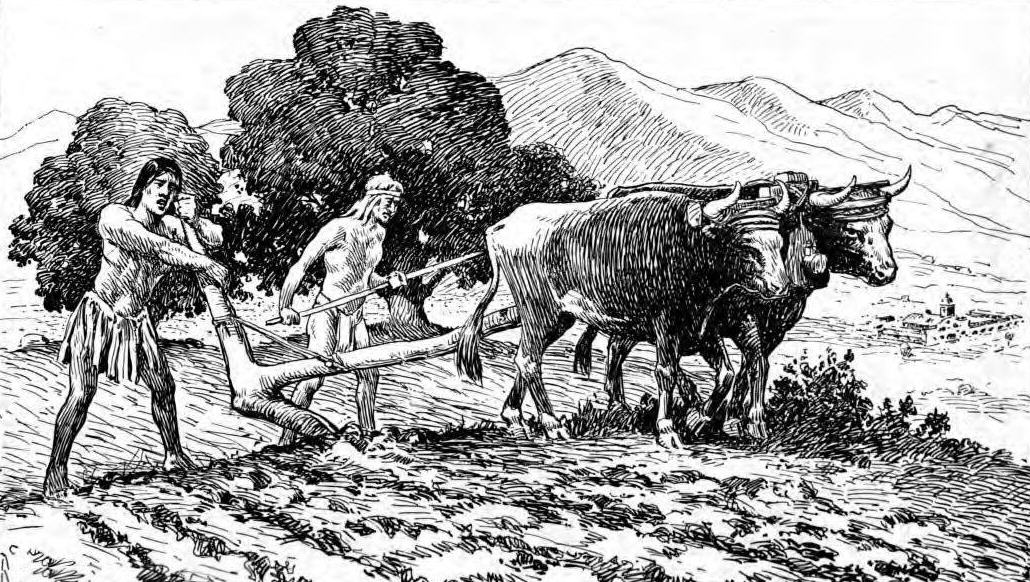
Indigenous farmers preparing a field for planting near Mission San Diego de Alcalá. Drawing by A.B. Dodge, 1920.

For almost three centuries after Columbus' voyages to the New World, much of western North America remained unsettled by white colonists, despite various territorial claims made by European colonial powers. European interest in the vast territory was initially motivated by the search for precious metals, especially gold, and the fur trade, with miners, trappers, and hunters among the first people of European descent to permanently settle in the West. The early years were also a period of scientific exploration and survey, such that by 1830 the rough outline of the western half of the continent had been mapped to the Pacific Ocean.

Year	Date	Event
1540	Feb 23	Spanish conquistador Francisco Vázquez de Coronado embarks on an expedition into the unexplored territory north of colonized Mexico to search for the fabled Seven Cities of Gold. The voyage lasts more than two years, during which Coronado travels through much of the American Southwest and as far north as present-day Kansas. His party is the first to document the geography and indigenous peoples of significant portions of the West.
1579	Jun 17	English explorer Francis Drake lands his expedition on the Pacific coast of North America in present-day Drakes Bay, California, claiming all of the land not already under Spanish control for the English Crown.
1598	Apr	Spanish explorer Juan de Oñate establishes Nuevo México in the region around the upper Rio Grande as the northernmost province of New Spain, serving as its first colonial governor.
1607		Spanish colonists establish the city of Santa Fe in the province of Santa Fe de Nuevo México.
1610		The Palace of the Governors is built in Santa Fe, the new capital of Nuevo México. Today it is the oldest continuously occupied public building in the United States.
1680	Aug 10	An alliance of Puebloans coordinated by Popé initiates a mass revolt against Spanish colonists occupying what is now northern New Mexico in an effort to abolish European influence in the area. More than 400 people are killed and the Spanish are unable to reconquer Santa Fe for another 12 years.
1692		Santa Fe is formally repossessed by the Spanish after Diego de Vargas negotiates a peace with the Pueblo Indians. The following six years witness a difficult reinstatement of Spanish and Franciscan rule over the Pueblos, including another revolt in 1696, which is successfully countered by De Vargas and his forces.
1706	Apr 23	The city of Albuquerque is founded in Santa Fe de Nuevo México as La Villa Real de San Francisco de Alburquerque by provincial governor Francisco Cuervo y Valdés.
1718	May 1	The Misión San Antonio de Valero, later known as The Alamo, is founded in Spanish Texas to undermine French claims in the area. Four days later, the Presidio San Antonio de Béxar is established nearby to protect the new town of San Antonio de Béxar.
1743	Mar 30	François and Louis-Joseph Gaultier de La Vérendrye, on expedition west from Quebec, bury an inscribed lead plate near present-day Fort Pierre, South Dakota, claiming the area for France.
1759	Oct 7	A Spanish attack on a fortified Indian village along the Red River in what is now Texas is repulsed and defeated by allied Wichita, Comanche, and Tonkawa tribes.
1762	Nov 13	Louis XV of France transfers all of its territory west of the Appalachian Mountains to Charles III of Spain in a secret treaty just months prior to the negotiations that end the French and Indian War.
1769	Jul 16	Spanish Franciscans, led by friar Junípero Serra, establish Mission San Diego de Alcalá in Las Californias. By 1823, the missionaries successfully plant a series of 20 more missions along the coast of what becomes the Spanish province of Alta California. These missions bring European culture to the indigenous peoples of California, but also enable a serious decline of from one-third to one-half of the indigenous population there during the Mission period.
1775	Aug 20	A company of Spanish soldiers establishes a site for the Presidio San Agustín del Tucsón in what is now Tucson, Arizona.
1776	Jul 29	Two Franciscan priests lead the Domínguez–Escalante expedition west from Santa Fe in an attempt to find an overland route to the Spanish Catholic mission in Monterey. Though they fail to reach Las Californias, they explore previously unknown areas of the Colorado Plateau, become the first Europeans to enter the Great Basin, and establish the eastern section of what will later become the Old Spanish Trail.
1779	Sep 3	Comanche Indian leader Cuerno Verde is killed in combat with Spanish forces led by Juan Bautista de Anza in what is now Pueblo County, Colorado.
1783	Sep 3	The Treaty of Paris is signed by Great Britain and the United States of America, ending the American Revolutionary War and establishing the United States as an independent country.
1792	May 19	Captain George Vancouver's expedition drops anchor near present-day Seattle and proceeds to name Puget Sound, Mount Rainier, Vashon Island, and Restoration Point. Vancouver and his expedition are the first Europeans to explore the area, claiming it for the British Crown, along with much of the Pacific Northwest coast, including Vancouver Island and the Columbia River.

== 1800s ==
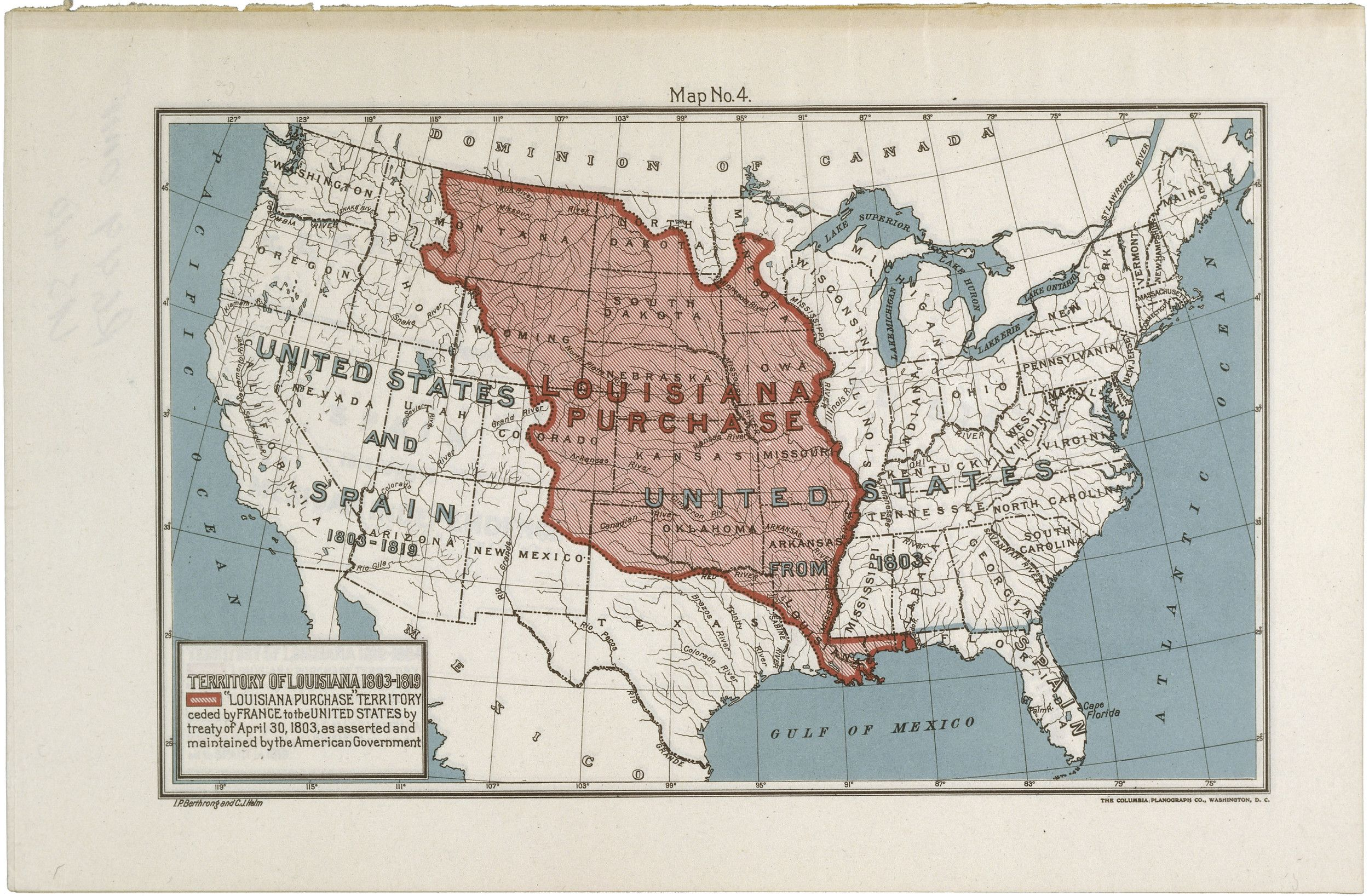
"Louisiana" and the Louisiana Purchase (Government Printing Office, 1912 Map No. 4)

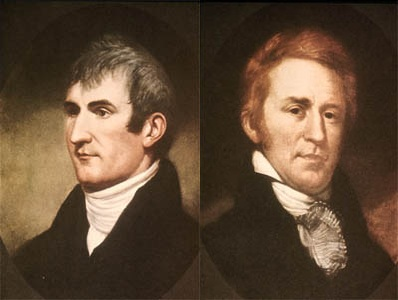
Meriwether Lewis and William Clark

Year	Date	Event
1800	Oct 1	Under pressure from Napoléon Bonaparte, the Kingdom of Spain transfers the colony of Louisiana back to the French Republic with the secret Third Treaty of San Ildefonso.
1803	Apr 1	The United States agrees to buy the colony of La Louisiane from the French Republic for the price of $15 million.
1803	Dec 20	The United States officially takes control of Louisiana, an enormous area of imprecise boundaries extending from the Mississippi River west to the Rocky Mountains, more than doubling the land area of the new nation.
1804	May 14	The Lewis and Clark Expedition sets out to explore and chart the territory acquired in the Louisiana Purchase. Officially titled the Corps of Discovery, the party canoes up the Missouri River from Saint Charles, spending the winter at Fort Mandan on Indian territory in what is now North Dakota.
1805	Nov 7	Lewis and Clark sight the Pacific Ocean for the first time, near the mouth of the Columbia River. The expedition winters at Fort Clatsop on the south side of the river, near present-day Astoria, Oregon.
1806	Jul 15	A U.S. Army reconnaissance expedition under the command of Lieutenant Zebulon Pike departs Fort Bellefontaine near Saint Louis to explore the southern Louisiana Territory.
1806	Sep 23	Lewis and Clark return to Saint Louis after a journey of nearly 6,000 total miles; in the past two and a half years, the party has made contact with over 70 Indian tribes and produced 140 maps, as well as documented more than 200 new plant and animal species.
1807	Feb 26	Spanish cavalrymen arrest the Pike Expedition in the province of Santa Fe de Nuevo México (now southern Colorado).
1808	Apr 6	German immigrant John Jacob Astor incorporates his American Fur Company.
1808	Nov 10	The Treaty of Fort Clark is signed, in which the Osage Nation cedes all of its territory east of Fort Clark and north of the Arkansas River to the United States.
1809	Nov 9	Welsh-Canadian explorer David Thompson establishes Saleesh House as a fur-trading post of the North West Company in what is now Montana.

== 1810s ==
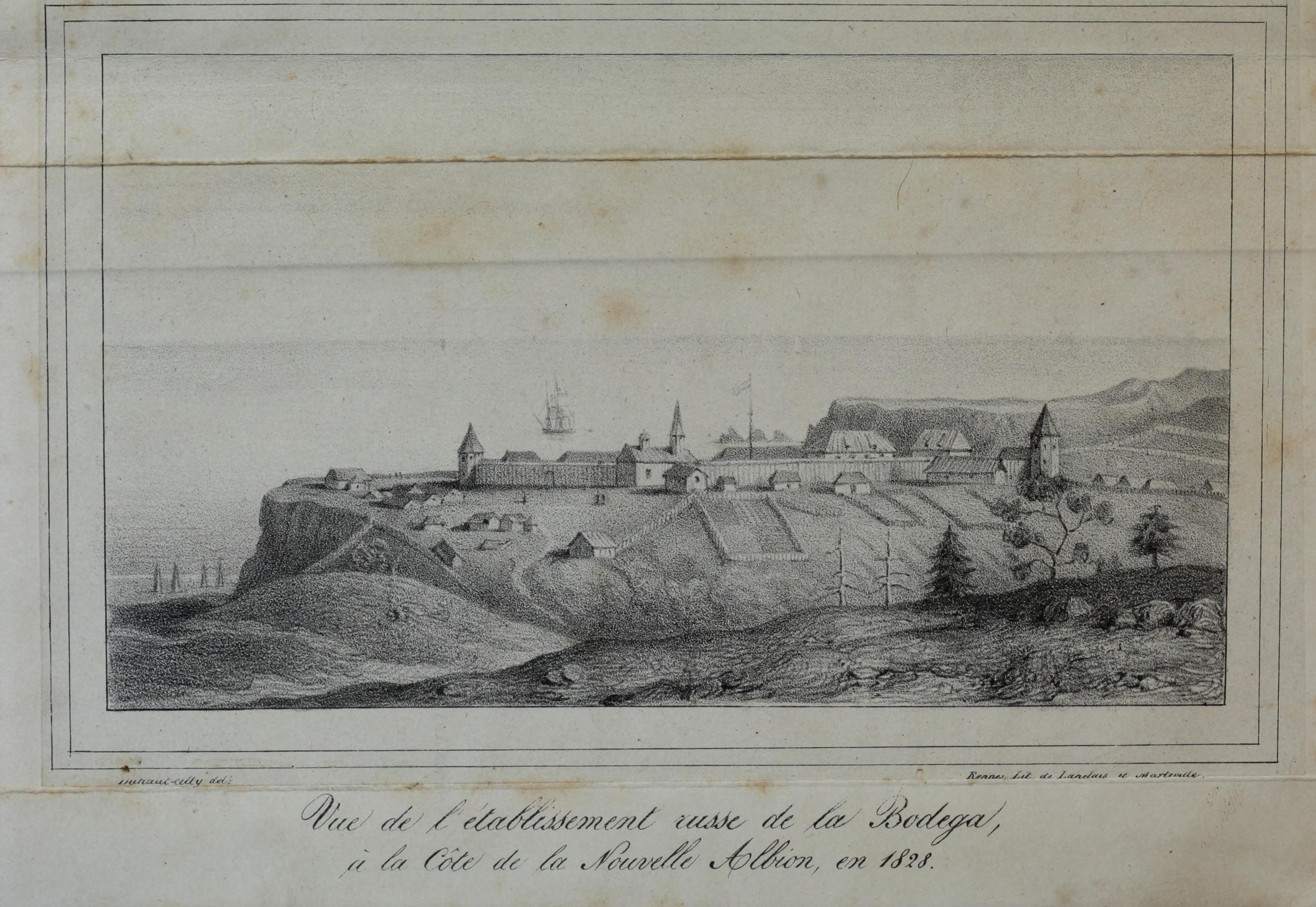
A view of Fort Ross in 1828 by A.B. Duhaut-Cilly

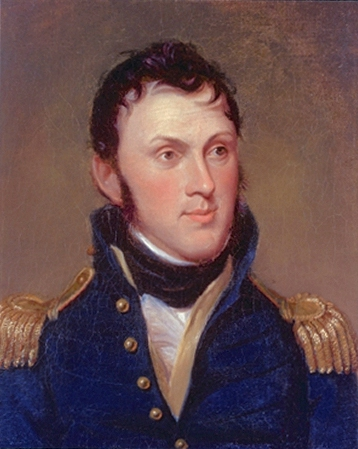
Stephen Harriman Long

Year	Date	Event
1810	Sep 16	Mexican priest Miguel Hidalgo y Costilla proclaims the independence of Mexico from the Kingdom of Spain.
1811	May	Fort Astoria is established by John Jacob Astor's Pacific Fur Company at the mouth of the Columbia River. It is the first American settlement on the Pacific coast.
1811	Jun 15–16	Most of the crew of the Tonquin, one of Astor's ships trading on Vancouver Island, are massacred by Tla-o-qui-aht Indians after the captain insults a chief. The ship is scuttled the following day in a magazine explosion that kills at least 100 natives.
1812	Mar	Fort Ross is established by Russian traders on the California coast as the hub of the southernmost colony in Russian America.
1812	Apr 30	Louisiana is admitted as the 18th U.S. state, and the first to include land west of the Mississippi River. It is also the first state organized from the Louisiana Purchase territory, the rest of which is soon renamed the Missouri Territory.
1812	Sep 4	Scottish and Irish settlers led by Miles Macdonell formally take possession of the Red River Colony. They construct Fort Daer near present-day Pembina, North Dakota, which becomes the first permanent European-American settlement in the Dakotas.
1812	Oct 21	Carrying word of the fate of the Tonquin to Saint Louis, seven men of the Pacific Fur Company, led by Robert Stuart, become the first European Americans to cross the Continental Divide at South Pass, in present-day Wyoming. Later in the century, the pass will be used by half a million westward migrants as part of the main route of several emigrant trails.
1813	Mar 29	During the Mexican War of Independence, a joint expedition of Mexican and American filibusters penetrates deep into Spanish Texas and defeats a Royalist army outside San Antonio de Béxar at the Battle of Rosillo Creek. Provincial governor Manuel María de Salcedo is executed five days later.
1817	Dec 25	Construction begins on a frontier military post known as Fort Smith in what is now Arkansas.
1818	Oct 20	The Treaty of 1818 establishes the 49th parallel from Lake of the Woods west to the Rocky Mountains as the boundary between the United States and British North America.
1819	Mar 2	The Arkansas Territory is organized.
1819	Sep 17	Intending to build forts along the Missouri River, a U.S. Army expedition led by Colonel Henry Atkinson and Major Stephen Harriman Long arrives by paddle steamer at Council Bluff on the river's west bank, in present-day Nebraska. It establishes what later becomes Fort Atkinson, the first Army outpost in the region, but the expedition stalls there over the winter and collapses entirely in the spring.

== 1820s ==
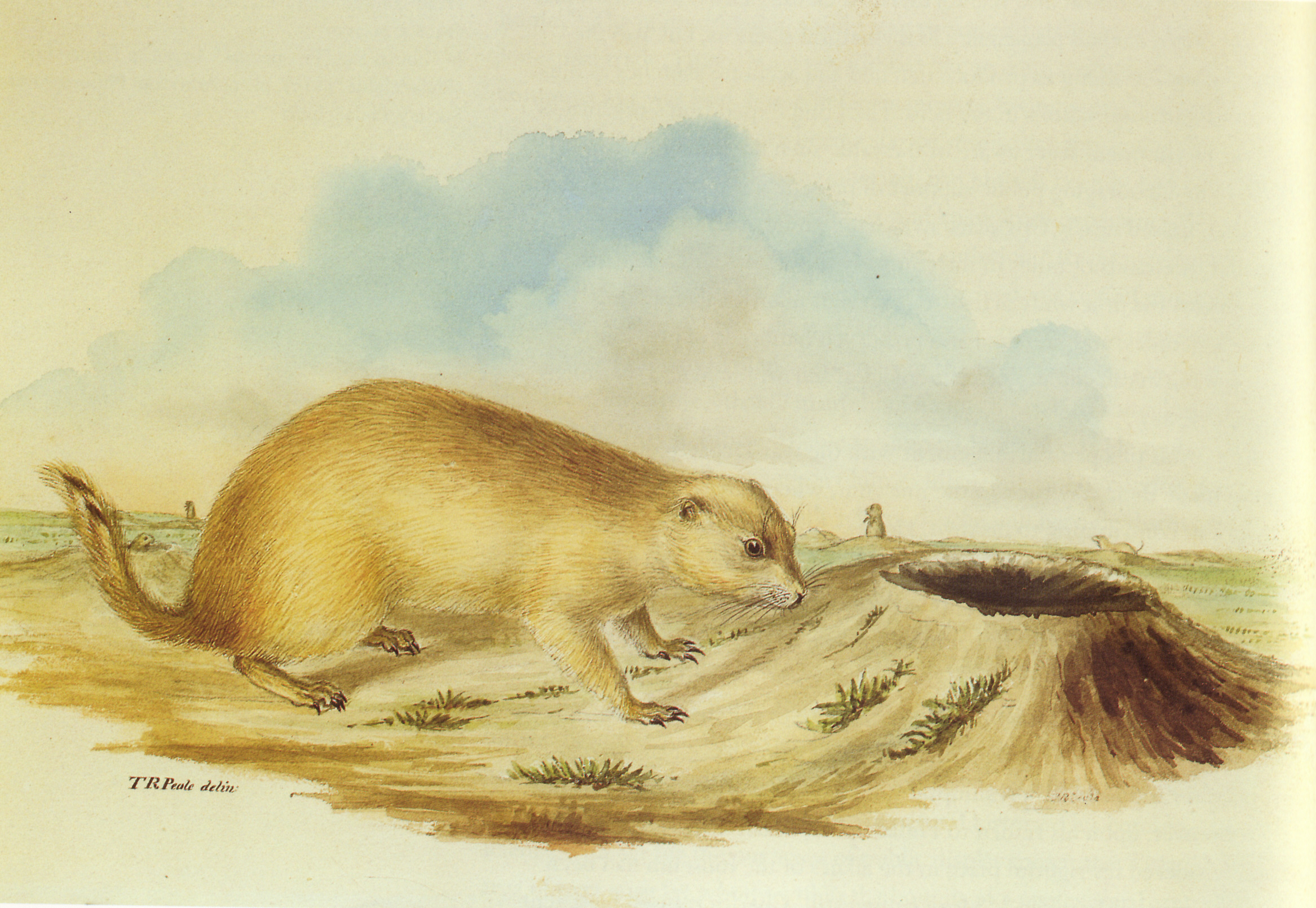
Prairie dog by Titian Ramsay Peale, c. 1819–1821

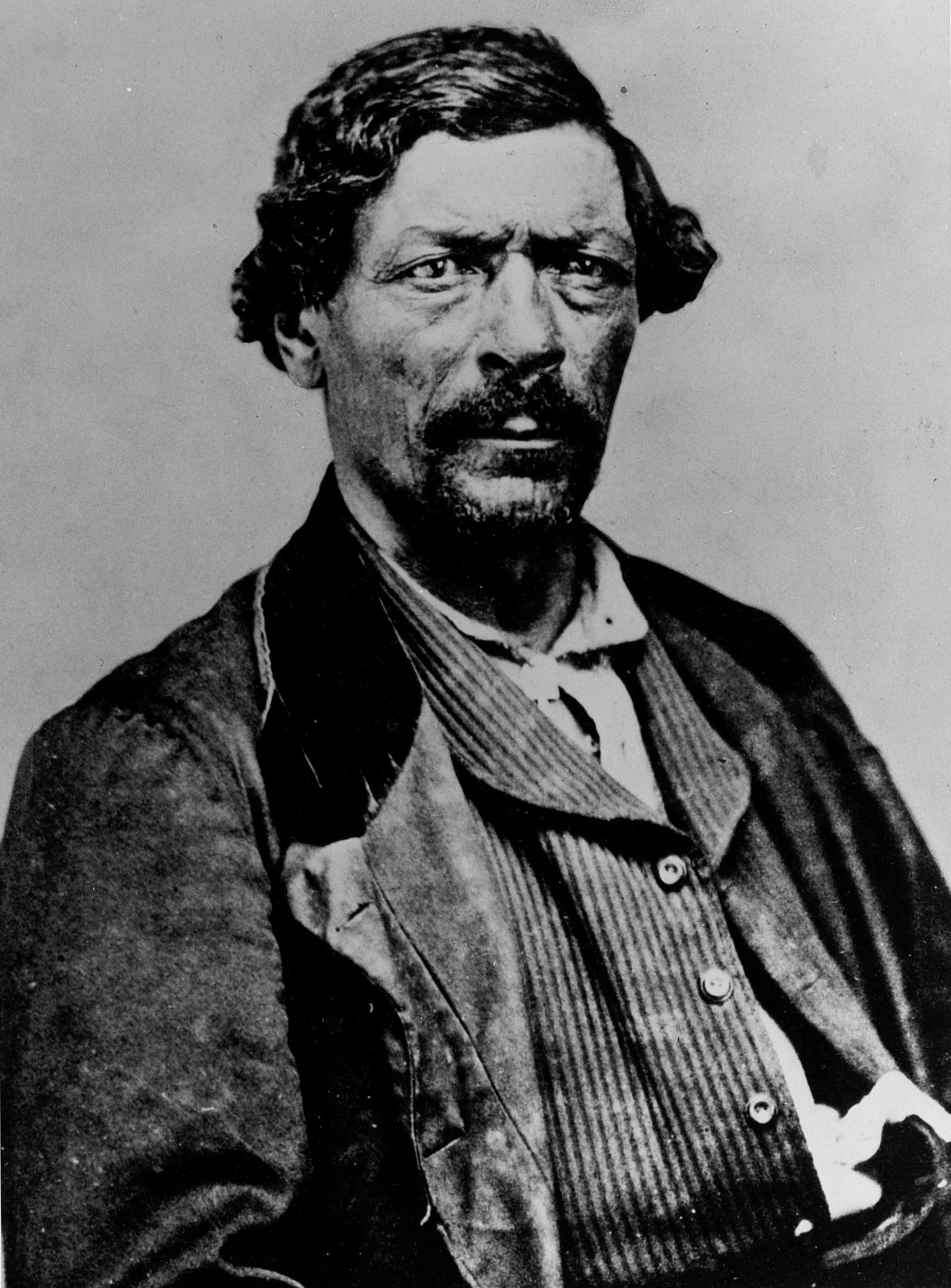
Jim Beckwourth

Year	Date	Event
1820	Mar 5	Congress passes the Missouri Compromise, prohibiting slavery in the unorganized territory north of parallel 36°30′ N and west of the Mississippi River, except within the boundaries of the proposed state of Missouri, while permitting the admission of Maine as a free state. Largely devised by Henry Clay, it is a landmark agreement in the debate over slavery in the West.
1820	May	Major Stephen H. Long leads a scientific expedition up the Platte River, along the Front Range of the Rocky Mountains, south to the Arkansas and Canadian rivers, and finally east to present-day Fort Smith, Arkansas. Among the first expeditions to bring American artists and scientists into the West, the party includes painter Samuel Seymour, artist-naturalist Titian Peale, and physician Edwin James, who leads the first recorded ascent of Pikes Peak. Long's report, published in 1823, promotes the idea of the Great Plains as the "Great American Desert".
1821	Feb 22	The Adams–Onís Treaty takes effect exactly two years after its initial signing, defining a new border between the territory of New Spain and the United States and further securing American claims to the Louisiana Purchase and the Oregon Country.
1821	Aug 10	Missouri is admitted as the 24th U.S. state.
1821	Aug 24	The Kingdom of Spain finally recognizes the independence of Mexico with the signing of the Treaty of Córdoba, ending the Mexican War of Independence.
1821	Sep 1	William Becknell and a party of frontier traders leave New Franklin, Missouri bound for Santa Fe. The Becknell route will become the Santa Fe Trail.
1822	Mar 6	William Henry Ashley and Andrew Henry place an advertisement in the Missouri Republican for one hundred "enterprising young men" to join a trapping expedition to the upper Missouri River. The respondents comprise "Ashley's Hundred", many of whom, including Jedediah Smith, Jim Bridger, Hugh Glass, and Jim Beckwourth, earn reputations as famous explorers and mountain men.
1823	Jun 2	Arikara warriors attack trappers working for Ashley's Rocky Mountain Fur Company on the banks of the Missouri River in what is now South Dakota, beginning the Arikara War. An expedition of American soldiers and their Sioux allies led by Lieutenant Colonel Henry Leavenworth retaliates against the Arikara several weeks later, marking the first armed conflict between the U.S. Army and Native Americans in the West.
1824	Apr 17	The Russo-American Treaty of 1824 is signed, formally transferring Russian claims in the Pacific Northwest south of parallel 54°40′ north to the United States.
1824	Apr 21	Fort Gibson is established near the confluence of the Grand River and the Arkansas River in present-day Oklahoma.
1824	Jul 7	The first of 297 pioneer families and partnerships known as the "Old Three Hundred" are granted land titles in American empresario Stephen F. Austin's colony in Coahuila y Tejas. They are the first American settlers of Mexican Texas under a recently reformed Mexican law.
1825	Mar 19	A new Hudson's Bay Company trading post built on the north bank of the Columbia River, in what is now the U.S. state of Washington, is christened Fort Vancouver.
1827	Mar 29	The town of Independence, Missouri is founded. In later years it becomes a common point of departure for pioneers journeying west on the emigrant trails.
1827	May 8	Colonel Henry Leavenworth founds a U.S. Army cantonment later known as Fort Leavenworth above the confluence of the Little Platte and the Missouri River in present-day Kansas.
1828	Jul 14	Trapper, explorer, and mountain man Jedediah Smith and his party are attacked by Umpqua Indians in the Oregon Country. Smith and three others are the only survivors.
1829	Nov 7	A merchant caravan led by Antonio Armijo embarks from Abiquiú, New Mexico and successfully reaches San Gabriel, California 86 days later, becoming the first to travel the length of the Old Spanish Trail.

== 1830s ==
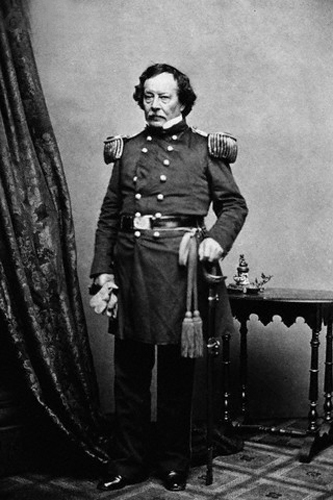
Benjamin Louis Eulalie de Bonneville

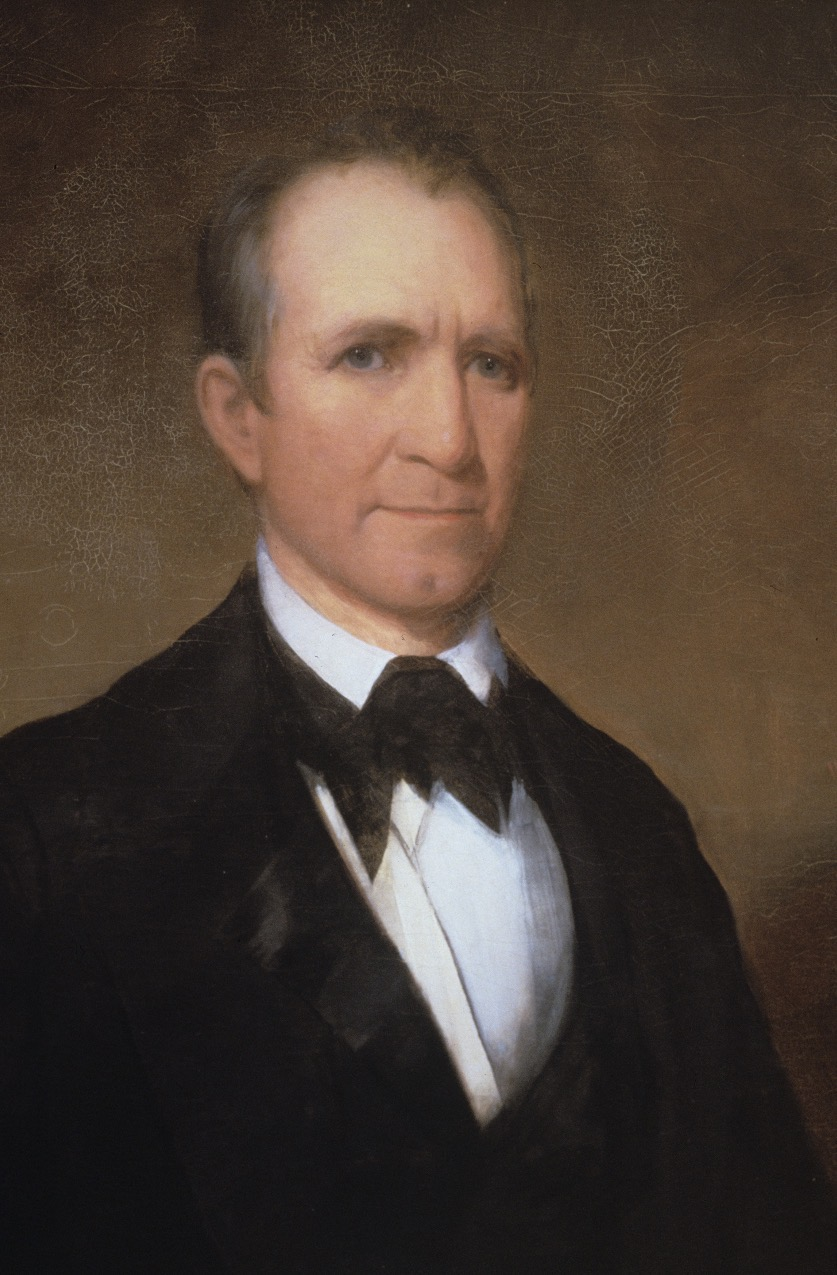
Sam Houston

Year	Date	Event
1830	Apr 6	The Law of April 6, 1830 is passed by the Mexican government, which increases tariffs on American goods entering Mexico, cancels unfulfilled colonization contracts, and bans any further immigration from the United States to Mexican Texas.
1830	May 28	The Indian Removal Act is signed into law by President Andrew Jackson, authorizing the U.S. government to negotiate the removal of Native American tribes of the southeastern United States to federal territory in what is now Oklahoma.
1831		Mexico ratifies the boundaries with the United States originally established by the Adams–Onís Treaty.
1831	Jun 19	On her maiden voyage, the steamboat Yellowstone arrives at what is now Pierre, South Dakota, hundreds of miles farther than any steam-powered vessel traveling up the Missouri River has yet reached, demonstrating the practicality of navigating large watercraft on the Upper Missouri.
1831	Autumn	Construction begins on Fort Pierre Chouteau, a trading post funded by Saint Louis fur baron Pierre Chouteau Jr., on the west bank of the Missouri River in what is now South Dakota, which quickly becomes a hub for the burgeoning fur trade on the Great Plains.
1831	Dec 5	In the Battle of Cahuenga Pass, an alliance of wealthy landowners in Los Angeles compels the unpopular Manuel Victoria, Governor of Alta California, to resign from office.
1832	May	The Bonneville Expedition departs Missouri with 110 men. Over the next two years, the party explores several major river systems in present-day Wyoming, Idaho, Oregon, and Washington, and establishes an overland route to California that will later become the California Trail.
1832	Jun 25–26	Texian insurgents under John Austin capture Fort Velasco from Mexican infantry under Colonel Domingo de Ugartechea at the Battle of Velasco, the first true military conflict between Anglo-American settlers of Mexican Texas and the Mexican federal government.
1832	Jul 17	Attendees of the annual fur trapper's rendezvous, the largest yet of its kind, clash with local Indians at the Battle of Pierre's Hole.
1833	Summer	William and Charles Bent, in partnership with Ceran St. Vrain, establish Fort William, later known as Bent's Fort, as a frontier trading post on the north bank of the Arkansas River, along the Santa Fe Trail, in what is now southeastern Colorado.
1834		Fort Laramie is founded by William Sublette in what is now eastern Wyoming as a private fur-trading post named Fort William.
1834	Jun 20	An expedition of the U.S. Army's First Regiment of Dragoons, led by Gen. Henry Leavenworth and Col. Moses Henry Dodge, departs Fort Gibson in the Indian Territory to explore the southwestern Great Plains. The party meets Wichita, Kiowa, and Comanche people several weeks later, representing the first formal contact between the U.S. government and Southern Plains Indians. Leavenworth dies on July 21 of injuries sustained during a buffalo hunt.
1834	Jul 31	Fort Hall is established on the Snake River in present-day Idaho.
1835	Spring	Frontier traders Louis Vasquez and Andrew Sublette establish Fort Vasquez on the South Platte River, 35 miles northeast of present-day Denver, Colorado.
1835	May 29	Col. Moses Henry Dodge leads the First Regiment of Dragoons west from Fort Leavenworth on a second diplomatic expedition, making official contact with numerous Indian tribes of the Central Plains over the next three months, including the Otoe, Omaha, Arikara, Pawnee, Cheyenne, and Gros Ventre.
1835	Oct 2	The Texas Revolution begins when a Texian militia successfully defends against the confiscation of a cannon by Mexican soldiers at the Battle of Gonzales.
1835	Oct 23	The Mexican Constitution of 1824 is repealed, abolishing the former federalist system of government and replacing it with a provisional centralist system under President-General Antonio López de Santa Anna. The move further alienates Anglo-American settlers in Mexican Texas.
1835	Dec 10	The two-month Siege of Béxar culminates in the surrender of the last remaining Mexican garrison in Texas, under Martín Perfecto de Cos, to the Texian Army under Edward Burleson. Santa Anna immediately prepares to march overland to recapture San Antonio.
1836	Feb 25	Samuel Colt is granted a patent for his invention of a "revolving gun". Colt firearms eventually become widely used in the West.
1836	Mar 6	Following a 13-day siege, Mexican troops under Santa Anna storm the Alamo Mission in San Antonio, killing all but a handful of its more than 200 Texian defenders, including Jim Bowie and Davy Crockett.
1836	Mar 27	More than 450 captured Texian soldiers are executed by the Mexican army at the Goliad massacre.
1836	Apr 21	Texians under General Sam Houston surprise and defeat the Mexican army at the Battle of San Jacinto, ending the Texas Revolution.
1836	May 2	Texians declare the independence of the Republic of Texas from Mexico. On May 14, they force captured General Antonio López de Santa Anna to sign the Treaties of Velasco, though Mexico never ratifies these treaties.
1836	Jun 15	Arkansas is admitted as the 25th U.S. state.
1837	Feb 15	The Platte Purchase is approved, adding more than 3,000 square miles of former Indian lands to the northwest corner of the state of Missouri in direct violation of the Missouri Compromise.
1837	Apr–May	A steamboat traveling up the Missouri River to Fort Union triggers an epidemic of smallpox that kills at least 17,000 indigenous people across the Great Plains over the next three years, dramatically reducing the populations of numerous tribes in the United States and Canada, including the Arikara, Assiniboine, and Pawnee, and causing the near-total extinction of the Mandan.
1838	Aug–Nov	Rural landowners clash with immigrant Mormons near Kansas City, Missouri in a series of violent episodes later called the Mormon War, eventually forcing their complete expulsion from the state.
1839	Jul 15–16	Militia forces of the Republic of Texas win a decisive victory over Cherokee and Delaware Indians at the Battle of the Neches, the main engagement of the Cherokee War of 1838–1839.

== 1840s ==
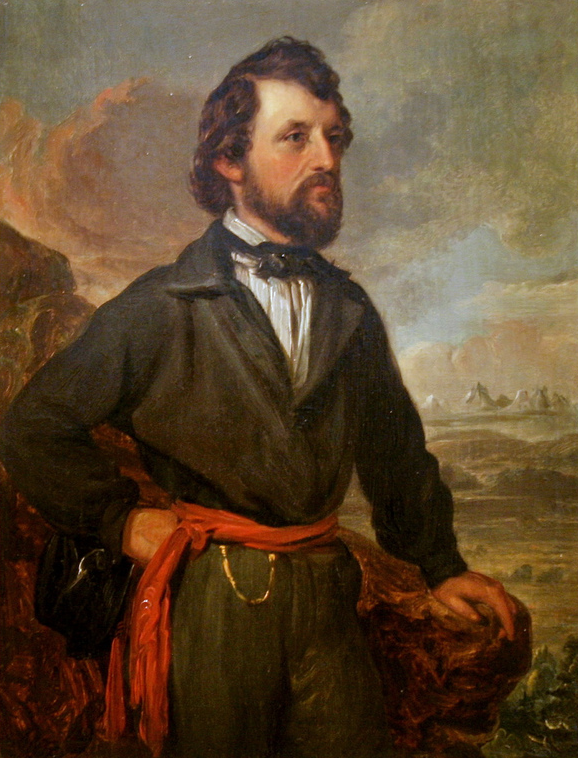
John C. Frémont

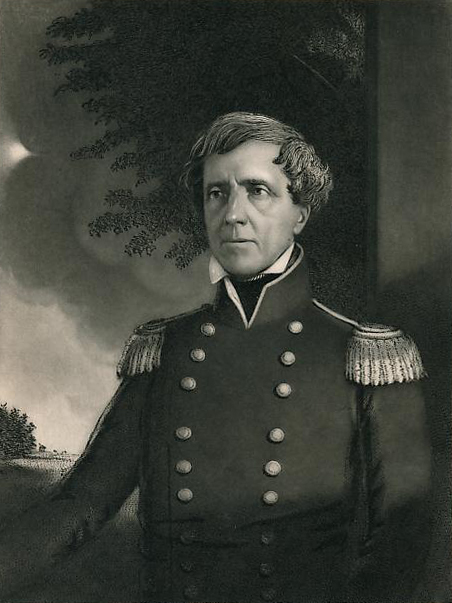
Stephen W. Kearny

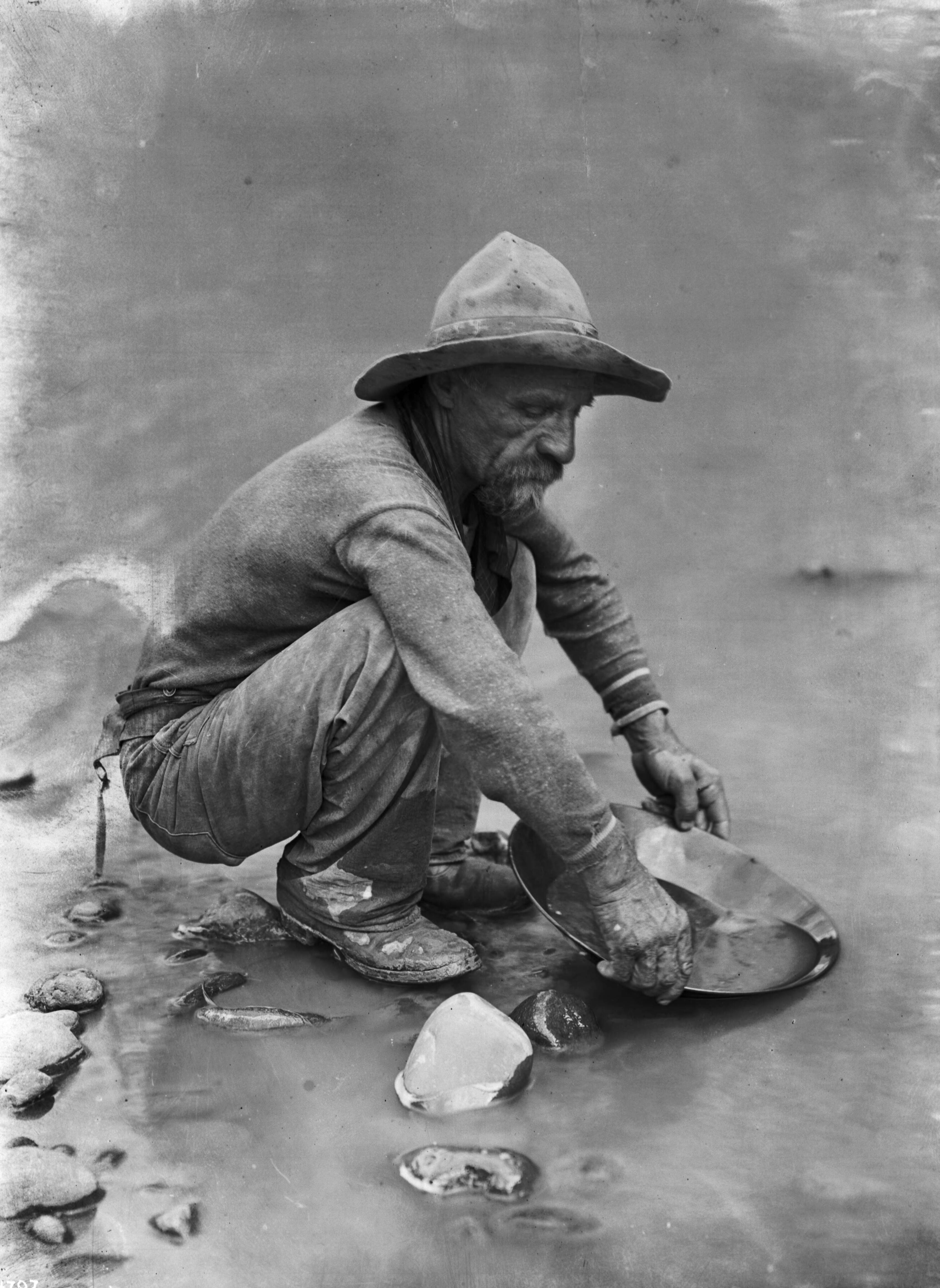
A forty-niner panning for gold in California

Year	Date	Event
1840	Mar 19	In the Council House Fight, a delegation of 33 Comanche chiefs and warriors is slaughtered by Texian militiamen while attempting to negotiate the return of captive white settlers at a peace conference in San Antonio.
1840	Apr 1	Political rivalries in the river town of Bellevue, Iowa Territory culminate in a shootout in front of the town hotel that leaves seven people dead.
1841	Jun 18	Swiss pioneer John Sutter receives title to nearly 50,000 acres of land surrounding the confluence of the Sacramento and American rivers in the Mexican province of Alta California, upon which he founds a colony he names "New Helvetia". In December, Sutter purchases the Russian settlement at Fort Ross and uses its building materials to construct a fort on the site of present-day Sacramento.
1841	Sep 24	At the request of Catholic Interior Salish Indians, Jesuit priests led by Father Pierre-Jean DeSmet establish St. Mary's Mission in the Bitterroot Valley, the first permanent settlement built by Europeans in what is now Montana.
1842	Mar 5	Mexican troops led by Ráfael Vásquez invade Texas and occupy San Antonio, but are chased back across the Rio Grande two days later.
1842	Apr 22	The first U.S. Army detachments arrive to begin construction of Fort Scott in what is now southeastern Kansas.
1842	Sep 17	After a five-day journey down the coast, pioneers from the Oregon Country sail the Star of Oregon, a hand-built wooden schooner, into San Francisco Bay, where they trade the ship for cattle to drive overland back to the Willamette Valley.
1842	Sep 18	Texas Rangers under Matthew Caldwell repulse the final Mexican invasion of the Republic of Texas, under Adrián Woll, in the Battle of Salado Creek. Simultaneously, a separate Texian company approaching Woll's army from the rear is overwhelmed and massacred.
1842	Dec 25–26	The Battle of Mier results when a Texian militia invades the Mexican border town of Ciudad Mier, Tamaulipas. The heavily outnumbered Texians are forced to surrender and more than 200 men are taken prisoner.
1843	Mar 25	Seventeen Texian prisoners of war are executed by the Mexican army after drawing beans in a random lottery, as punishment for their participation in a raid on the town of Ciudad Mier several months earlier.
1843	May 2	The Champoeg Meetings culminate with a motion to organize what will become the Provisional Government of Oregon, the first locally administered European-American body of government in the Oregon Country.
1843	May 22	The first of over 120 wagons and 800 immigrants depart Elm Grove, Missouri for the Oregon Country, accompanied by missionary and trail guide Marcus Whitman. The expedition travels overland for more than six months on a route pioneered by Whitman and arrives in the Willamette Valley in November, becoming the first major wagon train to travel the Oregon Trail and establishing the viability of the route for later immigrants.
1844		Oregon City, the western terminus of the Oregon Trail, becomes the first incorporated U.S. city west of the Rocky Mountains.
1844	Nov 25	The Stephens-Townsend-Murphy Party pioneers the first wagon route across the Sierra Nevada on the California Trail.
1845	Jun 1	John C. Frémont's third expedition with 55 men and Kit Carson as guide leaves St. Louis to "map the source of the Arkansas River" but continues to the Sacramento Valley.
1845	Jun 23	The Republic of Texas accepts a joint resolution of the U.S. Congress to annex Texas to the United States. Mexico does not recognize the annexation.
1845	Jul	The phrase "manifest destiny" first appears in the Democratic Review in an essay by John L. O'Sullivan urging the annexation of Texas. The concept does not become widely popular until O'Sullivan later uses the same phrase while addressing the subject of the Oregon Country.
1845	Dec 19	The "Lash Law" bans blacks from living in the Oregon Territory.
1845	Dec 29	The United States admits the Republic of Texas to the Union as the slave state of Texas. The boundaries of the state remain undefined.
1846	Feb 5	The Oregon Spectator becomes the first American newspaper published west of the Rocky Mountains.
1846	Apr 25	The first skirmish of the Mexican–American War takes place on the Rio Grande near present-day Brownsville, Texas.
1846	May 13	The United States under President James K. Polk declares war on Mexico, formally commencing the Mexican–American War.
1846	Jun 14	Mexican–American War: In the Bear Flag Revolt, American insurgents led by William B. Ide seize the Sonoma Barracks from Mexican officers and declare their intention to found an independent republic in northern Alta California. The so-called "Bear Flag Republic" lasts just 25 days, after which it is subsumed into American military efforts to control California.
1846	Jun 15	The Oregon Treaty resolves a decades-long dispute over possession of the Oregon Country by extending the original boundary between the United States and British North America further west to the Pacific Ocean, with Vancouver Island being retained in its entirety by the British.
1846	Aug 15	Mexican–American War: Troops under the command of General Stephen W. Kearny seize the territorial capital of Santa Fe for the United States with little resistance.
1846	Dec 6–7	Mexican–American War: Kearny's Army of the West engages Mexican lancers east of San Diego at the Battle of San Pasqual.
1846	Dec 25	Mexican–American War: American forces under Colonel Alexander W. Doniphan defeat Mexican regulars at the Battle of El Brazito.
1846	Dec 28	Iowa is admitted as the 29th U.S. state.
1847	Jan 19	Governor Charles Bent of the New Mexico Territory is assassinated and scalped during the Taos Revolt.
1847	Feb	The first of three relief missions arrives to rescue survivors of the Donner Party, who have been snowbound in California's Sierra Nevada mountains for more than three months.
1847	May	Fort Lewis, an American Fur Company trading post built the previous year, is moved 15 miles downstream of its original location to a site that will later be renamed Fort Benton. Near the furthest navigable point on the Missouri River, it is the last stop for steamboats traveling upstream from St. Louis, by which it soon becomes an important river port for mountain men and pioneers, as well as the oldest continuously inhabited European-American settlement in what is now Montana.
1847	Jul 24	Brigham Young and his vanguard company of Mormons first arrive in the Salt Lake Valley in present-day Utah.
1847	Nov 29	Fifteen Oregon missionaries, including mission founders Marcus and Narcissa Whitman, are murdered and 54 others taken hostage by a party of Cayuse Indians who accuse Whitman of deliberately poisoning Indians in his medical care during an outbreak of measles. The massacre sparks the Cayuse War.
1848	Jan 24	James W. Marshall discovers gold at Sutter's Mill near Coloma, California, precipitating the California Gold Rush.
1848	Feb 2	The United States and Mexico sign the Treaty of Guadalupe Hidalgo, ending the Mexican–American War. The agreement results in the cession of nearly all of the present-day Southwest, including California, to the U.S., as well as the designation of the Rio Grande as the boundary between Texas and Mexico.
1848	Spring	The Army relocates Fort Kearny from its original location near Nebraska City to a new site more than 200 miles to the west, along the Platte River and the major emigrant trails.
1848	Dec	John Sutter, Jr. and Samuel Brannan begin platting Sacramento City, California, at a site two miles south of Sutter's Fort.
1849	Feb 28	Regular steamboat service between the east and west coasts of the United States begins with the arrival of the SS California in San Francisco.
1849	Mar 3	The Minnesota Territory is organized from portions of the Wisconsin and Iowa Territories.
1849	Oct 28	A party of white settlers approaching Santa Fe is massacred by Jicarilla Apaches, who kidnap the only three survivors, beginning the Jicarilla War. U.S. cavalry guided by Antoine Leroux and Kit Carson later catch up with the Apaches but discover the hostages have been killed.

== 1850s ==
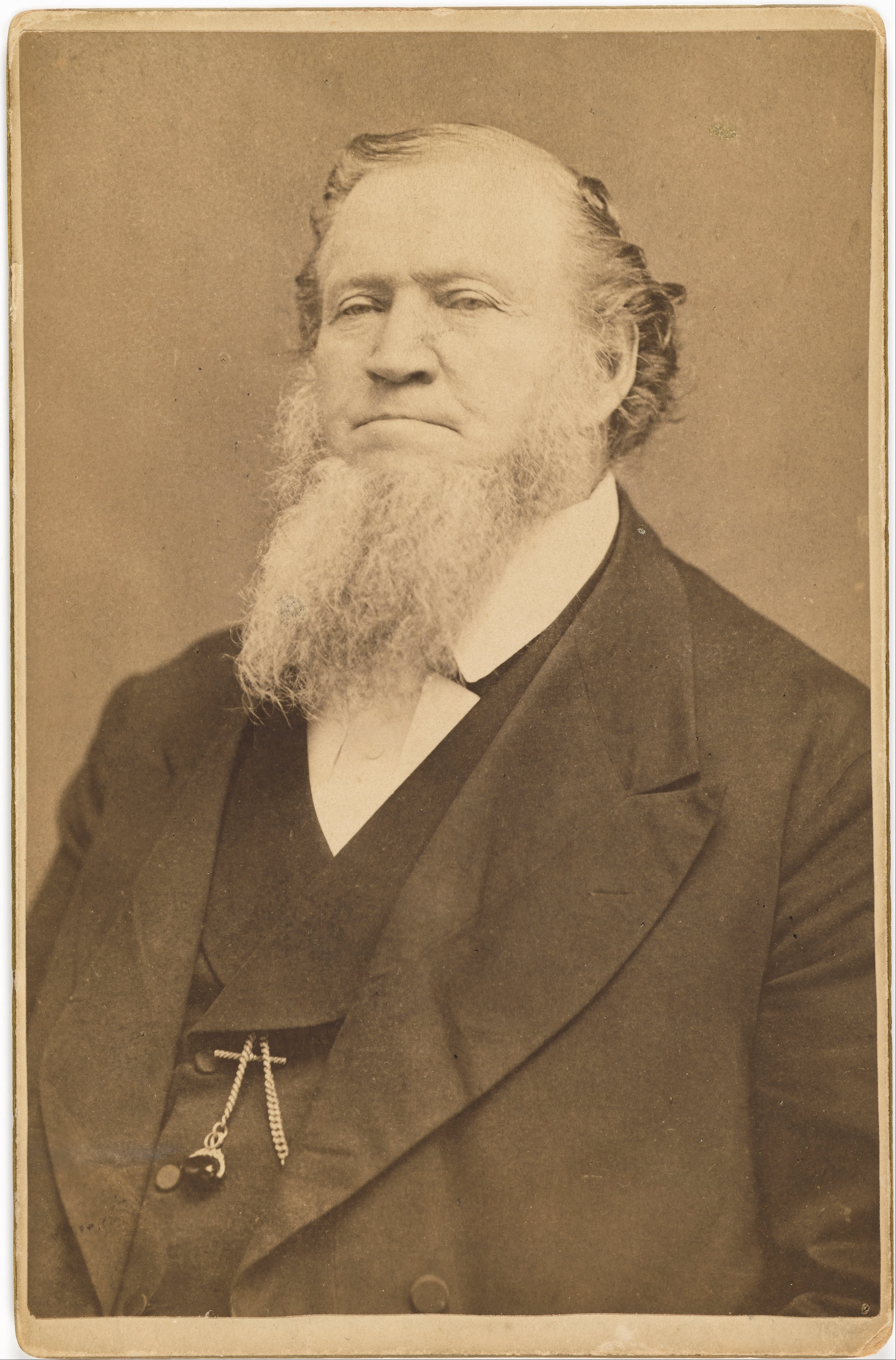
Brigham Young circa 1865.

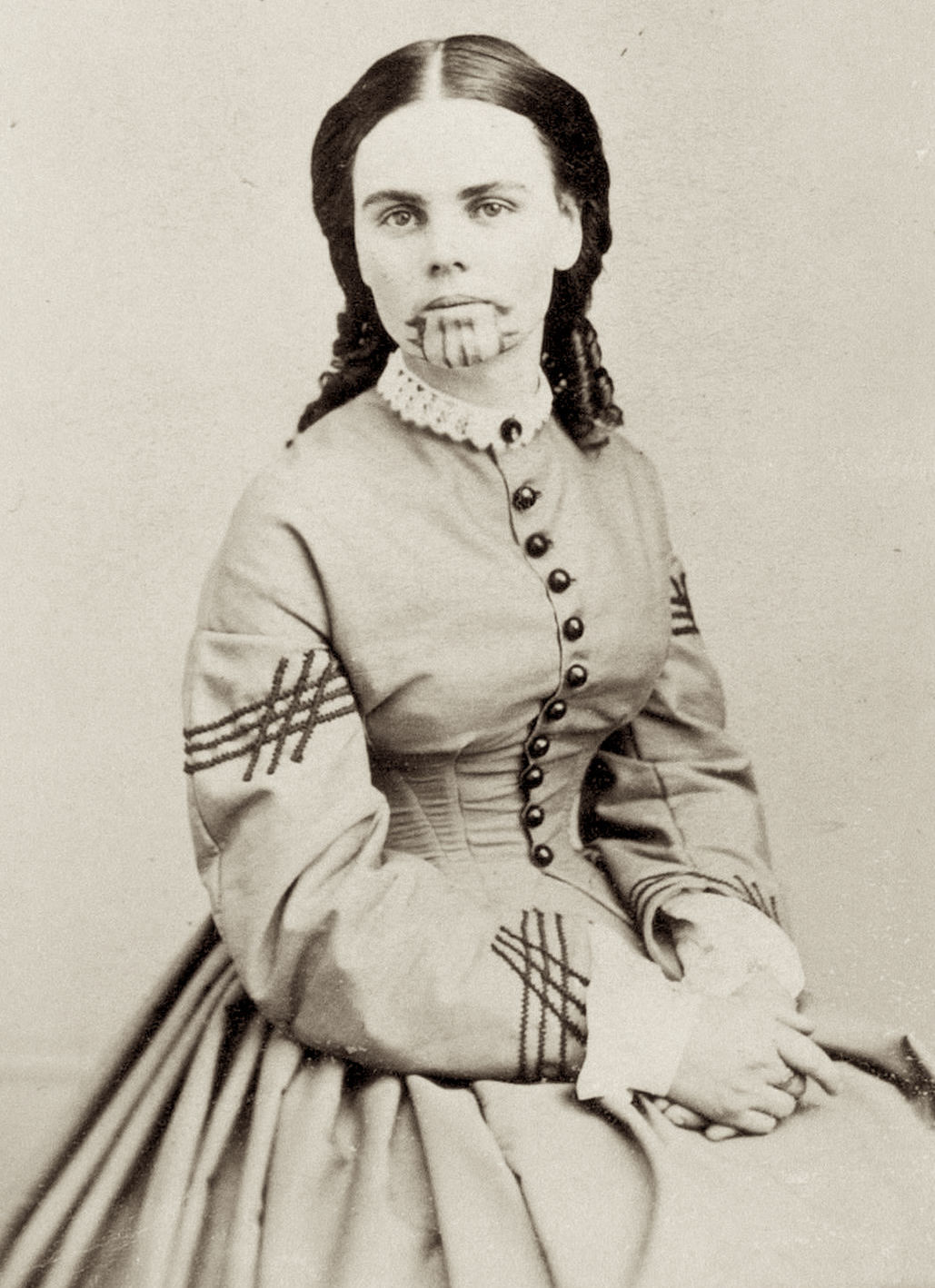
Olive Oatman

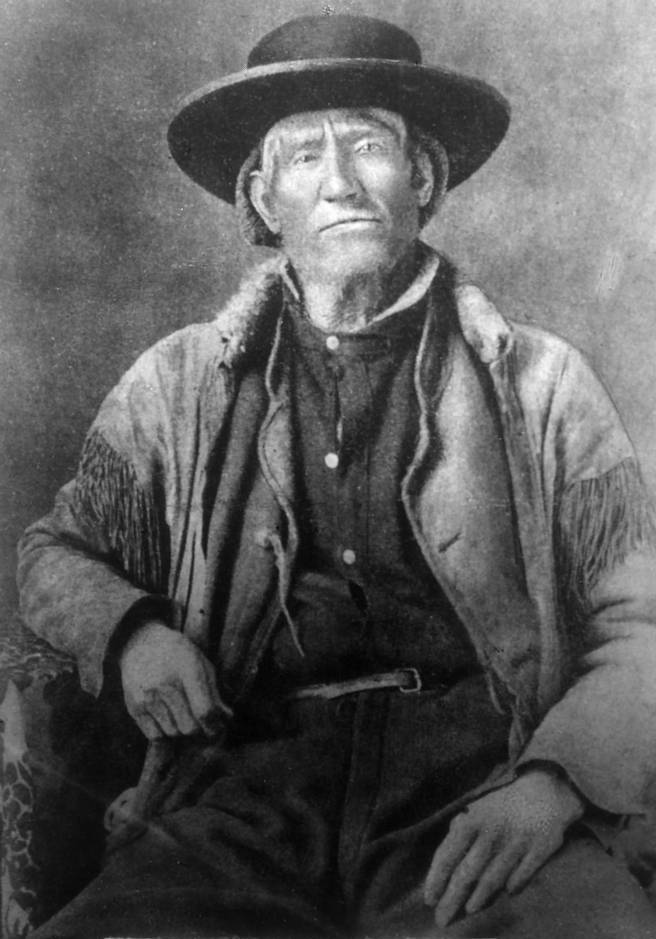
Jim Bridger

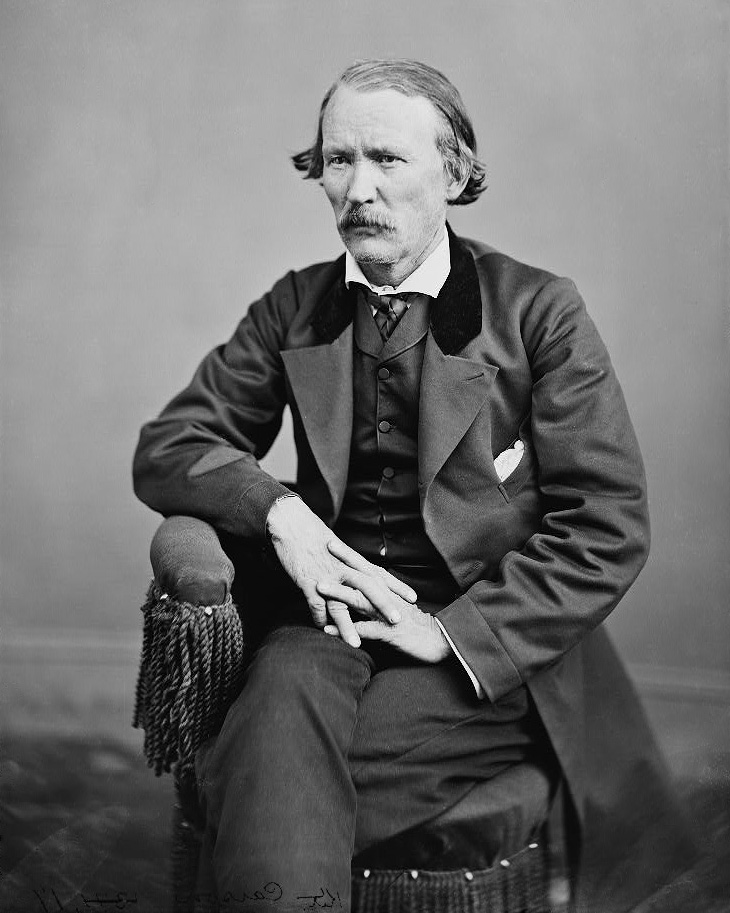
Kit Carson

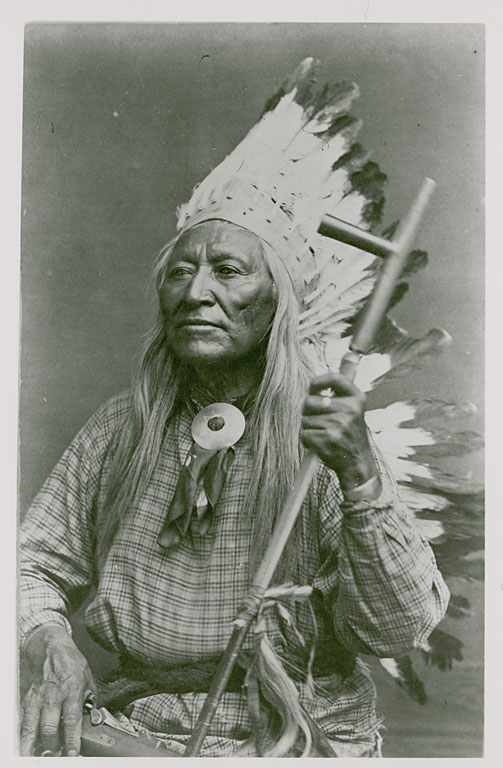
Pinaquanah (Washakie)

Map of western military departments, circa 1858

Year	Date	Event
1850	Jan 29	Responding to questions of how to accommodate slavery in the western territories, Henry Clay proposes a series of measures to preserve the Union that come to be called the Compromise of 1850.
1850	Feb	The Pinkerton National Detective Agency is founded.
1850	Feb 8–10	The Nauvoo Legion, under orders from Brigham Young, attacks Timpanogos Indians over land disputes near Fort Utah.
1850	Apr 4	The city of Los Angeles, California is incorporated.
1850	Apr 15	The city of San Francisco, California is incorporated.
1850	Apr 16	The California territorial government sends a military expedition to attack hostile Yuma Indians along the Colorado River in retaliation for the Glanton Massacre earlier in the year, sparking the Yuma War.
1850	Jun 1	The Town of Kansas, later Kansas City, is incorporated in the state of Missouri.
1850	Jun 3	Five Cayuse tribesmen are hanged in Oregon City for their participation in the Whitman massacre.
1850	Sep 9	California is admitted as the 31st U.S. state.
1850	Sep 9	The New Mexico Territory and Utah Territory are organized by order of Congress.
1850	Sep 27	The Donation Land Claim Act takes effect to promote homestead settlement in the Oregon Territory.
1850	Sep 29	President Millard Fillmore appoints Brigham Young the first governor of the Utah Territory.
1851		The phrase "Go West, young man" first appears in an editorial by Indiana newspaper writer John B.L. Soule in the Terre Haute Express. The saying is later popularized by Horace Greeley, editor of the New-York Tribune.
1851		Western Union is founded as The New York and Mississippi Valley Printing Telegraph Company.
1851	Jan 23	The flip of a coin determines whether a new city in Oregon is named after Boston, Massachusetts, or Portland, Maine, with Portland winning.
1851	Feb 18	A family of Brewsterite pioneers traveling a southern route to California is massacred by Indians on the banks of the Gila River in what is now Arizona. Thirteen-year-old Olive Oatman and her eight-year-old sister Mary Ann are abducted and enslaved.
1851	Feb 27	Congress passes the Appropriation Bill for Indian Affairs, which allocates funds to move western Native American tribes on to permanent reservations enclosed and protected by the federal government. The act sets the precedent for modern reservations in the United States.
1851	Mar 27	Mariposa Battalion, led by James D. Savage, are the first reported non-natives to enter California's Yosemite Valley.
1851	May 2	Gold is discovered along the Rogue River in Oregon, triggering a gold rush.
1851	May 3–4	San Francisco Fire of 1851: The most severe of a series of seven fires destroys most of the main business district of San Francisco, California.
1851	Jul 26	Fort Union is established in the New Mexico Territory.
1851	Sep 17	The Treaty of Fort Laramie (1851) is negotiated between the United States government and representatives of ten Native American tribes of the Great Plains, including the Lakota, Crow, and Cheyenne. The tribes agree to provide safe passage for westward migrants and permit the construction of roads and forts in their territories in return for an annuity of $50,000 for fifty years.
1851	Sep 22	The city of Fort Des Moines is incorporated in the state of Iowa.
1851	Nov 13	The Denny Party lands at Alki Point, the first settlers of what will become Seattle, Washington.
1852	Mar 18	The Wells Fargo company is founded to provide express and banking services to California.
1853	Mar	Levi Strauss arrives in San Francisco and opens a store supplying goods and clothing to Gold Rush miners.
1853	Mar 2	The Washington Territory is organized from a portion of the Oregon Territory.
1853	Jun 27	Fort Riley is established in what is now Kansas.
1853	Jul 13	In the case of Holmes v. Ford, a decision of the Oregon Territorial Supreme Court reaffirms that slavery is illegal in the Oregon Territory, concluding the last challenge of abolitionist law by pro-slavery elements living in Oregon.
1853	Jul 23	Encouraged by pioneer ferryman William D. Brown, the Council Bluffs & Nebraska Ferry Company is chartered by the State of Iowa to transport settlers across the Missouri River to a proposed townsite that will later be named Omaha City.
1853	Oct 26	Paiute Indians attack U.S. Army Captain John W. Gunnison and his party of 37 soldiers and railroad surveyors near Sevier Lake, Utah.
1853	Dec 30	The United States and Mexico agree to the Gadsden Purchase, transferring portions of southern Arizona and New Mexico to the U.S.
1854	Feb 13	The Mexican army forces would-be conqueror William Walker and his mercenary troops to retreat to Sonora.
1854	Feb 14	Texas is linked by telegraph with the rest of the country when a connection between New Orleans and Marshall, Texas is completed.
1854	Mar 30	Jicarilla War: A detachment of the 1st U.S. Cavalry engages Apache and Ute warriors led by Flechas Rayadas at the Battle of Cieneguilla in what is now northern New Mexico.
1854	May 30	The Kansas–Nebraska Act becomes law, creating the Kansas Territory and Nebraska Territory. A provision that settlers will vote on the legality of slavery in the new territories effectively rescinds the Missouri Compromise of 1820 and touches off an epidemic of violence and electoral fraud beginning the next year.
1854	Jun 24	Fort Tejon is established at the southern end of the San Joaquin Valley in California.
1854	Jul 4	Omaha City is founded in the Nebraska Territory.
1854	Aug 19	An argument over a stray cow precipitates the Grattan massacre, in which 30 U.S. Army soldiers and an interpreter are killed in retaliation for the shooting of Chief Conquering Bear of the Lakota Sioux.
1854	Dec 19	Jonathan R. Davis, a veteran of the Mexican–American War and a gold rush prospector, single-handedly kills eleven armed immigrant outlaws near Sacramento, California using two revolvers and a Bowie knife.
1855	Jan 23	The first permanent bridge across the Mississippi River opens for traffic in Minneapolis, Minnesota.
1855	Sep 2–3	U.S. Army detachments under Brigadier General William S. Harney defeat a band of Brulé Lakota led by Little Thunder at the Battle of Ash Hollow in present-day Garden County, Nebraska, a punitive expedition for the Grattan massacre.
1855	Sep 25	Bureau of Indian Affairs agent Andrew Bolon is murdered by renegade Yakama people in the Washington Territory, precipitating the Yakima War.
1856	Jan 25	Puget Sound War: The Battle of Seattle is fought when a Yakama army, allied with local Nisqually, Klickitat, Puyallup, and other tribes, attacks the pioneer settlement of Seattle in the Washington Territory. The warriors are scattered by offshore artillery fire from USS Decatur.
1856	Feb 2	The city of Dallas is incorporated in Texas.
1856	May 14	James King of William, editor of the Daily Evening Bulletin, is shot in the streets of San Francisco by James P. Casey, editor of The Sunday Times and a member of the city's Board of Supervisors, whose corruption and criminal record King had criticized in an editorial. King dies six days later.
1856	May 21	The predominantly abolitionist town of Lawrence, Kansas is ransacked and looted by a pro-slavery militia.
1856	May 22	The assassination of James King of William incites the re-establishment of the San Francisco Committee of Vigilance, which storms the city jail and publicly hangs James P. Casey along with convicted murderer Charles Cora.
1856	May 24–25	Outraged at the sacking of Lawrence, abolitionist John Brown and a party of Free-Staters murder five pro-slavery activists in rural Kansas Territory in the Pottawatomie massacre. In the three months of retaliatory raids and murders that follow, more than two dozen people are killed, marking the bloodiest episode of the Bleeding Kansas era.
1856	June	Fort Randall is established by General William S. Harney on the upper Missouri River in what is now South Dakota.
1857	Mar 3	Fort Abercrombie is established by order of Congress on the Red River of the North, the first permanent U.S. military settlement in what is now North Dakota.
1857	Mar 8–12	At least 35 pioneers are killed and four young women are taken captive in northwestern Iowa by a renegade band of Santee Sioux in the Spirit Lake massacre.
1857	Mar 26	Robert J. Walker is appointed governor of the Kansas Territory by President James Buchanan, but quickly resigns in opposition to the pro-slavery Lecompton Constitution.
1857	Mar 30	In his letter of resignation from the Utah Territorial Supreme Court, justice William W. Drummond accuses Mormons of subverting the U.S. Constitution and openly defying federal law, and insists that Brigham Young be replaced as Territorial Governor by a non-Mormon, heightening fears of an imminent Mormon rebellion.
1857	Apr 1–8	In the midst of Mexico's Reform War, former California Senator Henry A. Crabb leads a filibustering expedition into Sonora to aid Mexican rebels fighting government forces. The rebels turn on the Americans after they cross the border and Crabb's entire army is executed.
1857	Jul 9	U.S. cavalry charge and scatter a Cheyenne war party on the banks of the Solomon River in north-central Kansas Territory.
1857	Sep 1	The Battle of Pima Butte, in what is now Arizona, is the last major battle fought solely between indigenous peoples in North America.
1857	Sep 11	Nearly 120 emigrants passing through the Utah Territory are massacred by a combined force of Mormon militiamen and Paiute Indians during the hysteria of the Utah War.
1858	Feb 19	Chief Leschi, a leader of the Nisqually people, is hanged by the territorial government of Washington after being wrongfully convicted of killing a colonel during the Puget Sound War.
1858	Apr 19	The Yankton Treaty, signed by the Yankton Sioux, cedes most of what is now eastern South Dakota to the United States.
1858	May 11	Minnesota is admitted as the 32nd U.S. state.
1858	May 12	An army of Texas Rangers and Indian allies under the command of John Salmon Ford engages Comanche warriors in a series of battles after attacking villages in the Canadian River valley, the final actions of the Antelope Hills expedition.
1858	Jul	Gold is discovered in the Front Range of the Rocky Mountains. The resulting gold rush draws nearly 100,000 people to the Pike's Peak Country of present-day Colorado over the next three years.
1858	Nov 17	The town of Denver City is platted in what is now the state of Colorado.
1859	Spring	The Comstock Lode, the first major discovery of silver ore in the country, provokes a silver rush in present-day Nevada that funds boomtowns including Virginia City and Gold Hill. Over the next 30 years, hundreds of mines extract more than $320 million in gold and silver from the region, making millionaires of investors such as George Hearst and the Bonanza Kings.
1859	Feb 14	Oregon is admitted as the 33rd U.S. state.
1859	Sep 28–30	Mexican folk hero Juan Cortina and a large posse seize control of Brownsville, Texas in one of the major actions of the First Cortina War. His motivation is the legal abuses perpetrated by Texan authorities against ethnic Mexicans. The occupation only lasts two days, but the Cortina Troubles continue for another two years.
1859	Oct 4	The Kansas Territorial legislature ratifies the anti-slavery Wyandotte Constitution by a huge margin.

== 1860s ==
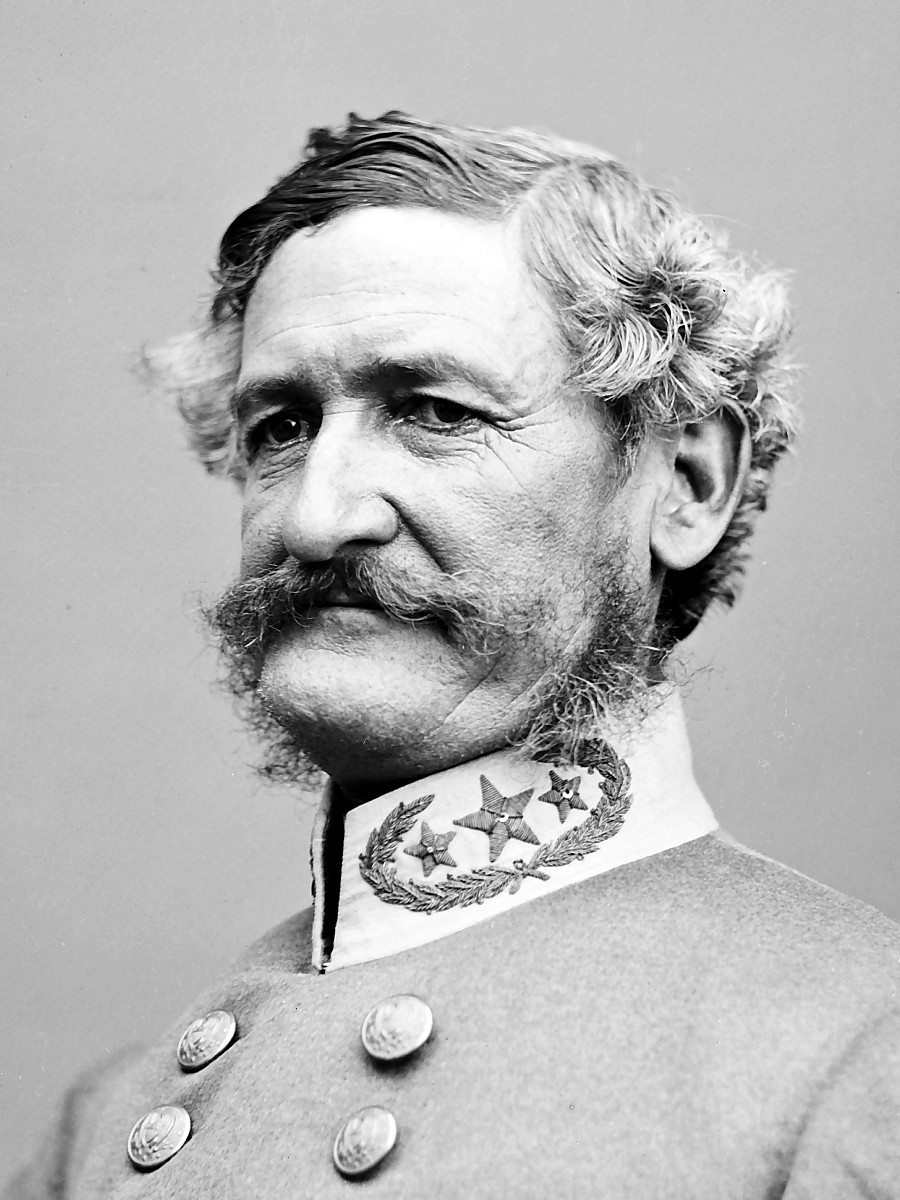
Henry Hopkins Sibley

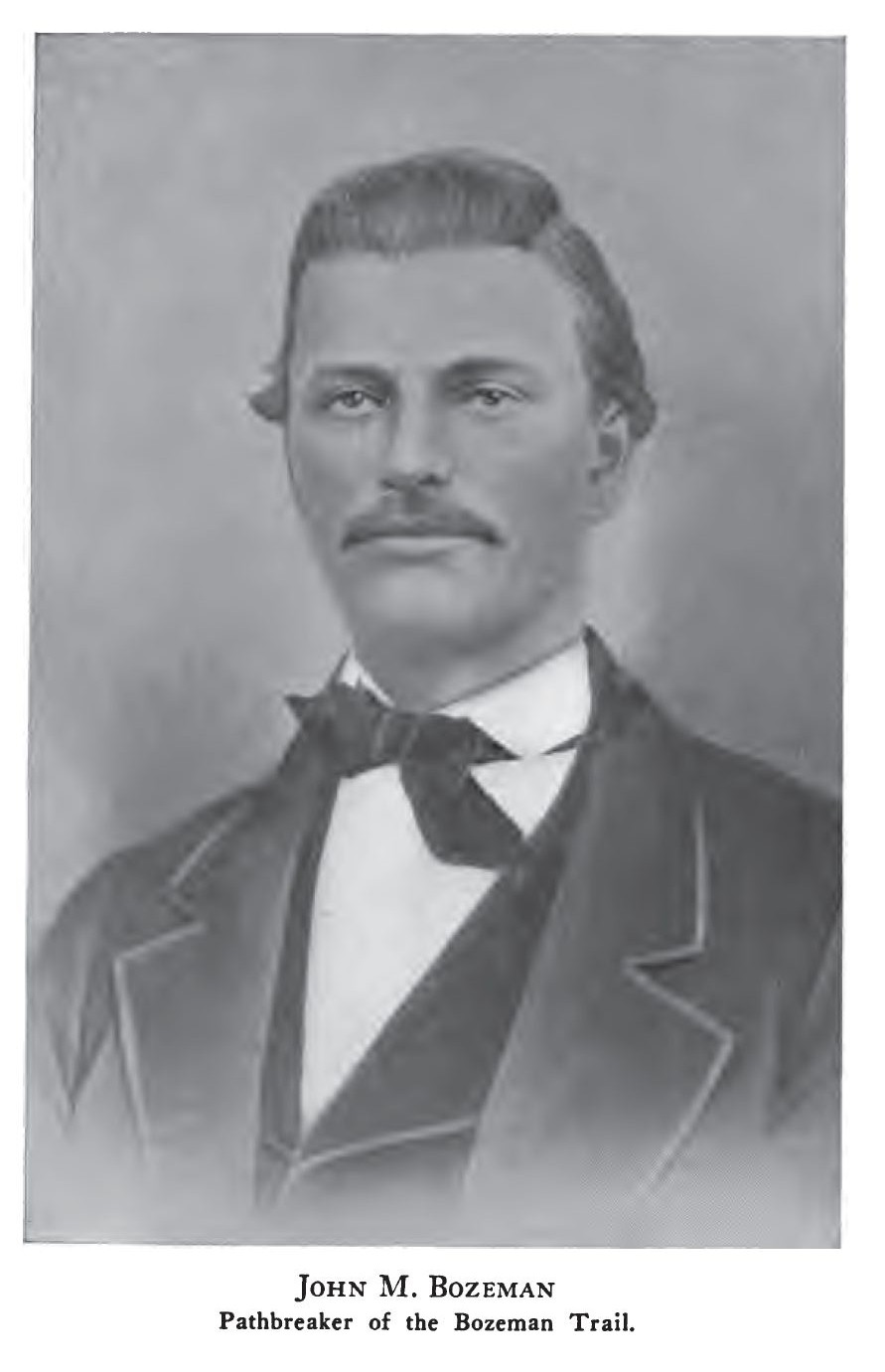
John Bozeman

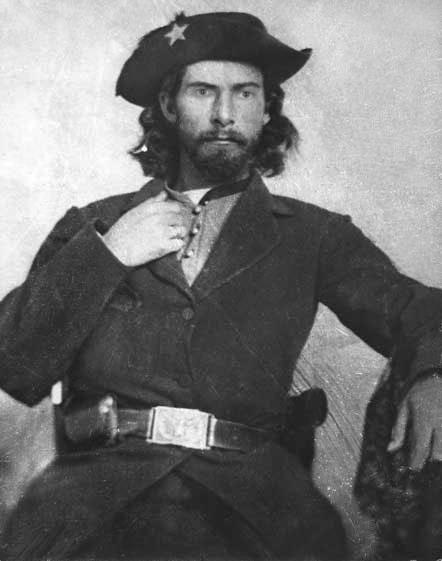
"Bloody Bill" Anderson

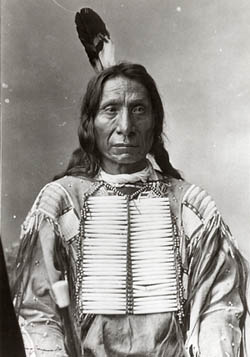
Maȟpíya Lúta (Red Cloud)

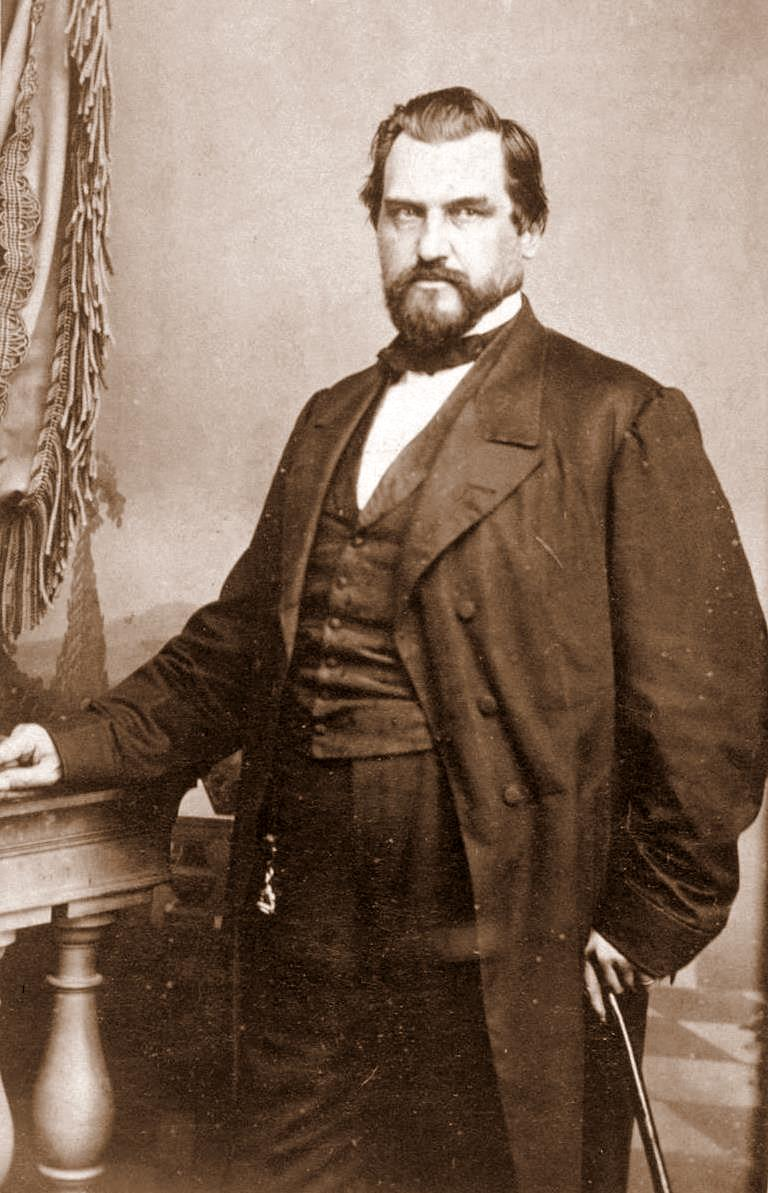
Leland Stanford

The Golden Spike ceremony joining the Union Pacific Railroad with the Central Pacific Railroad

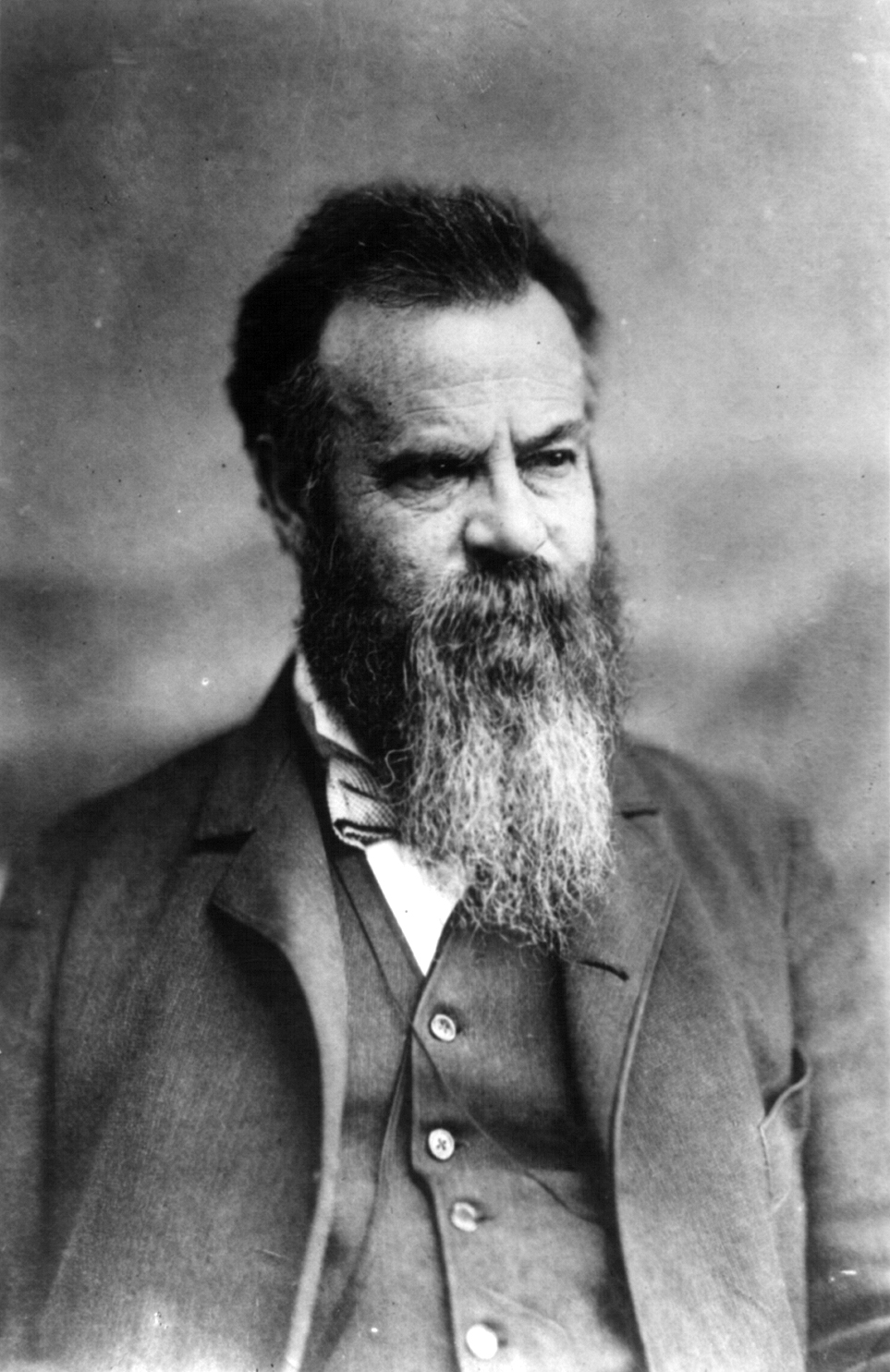
John Wesley Powell

Year	Date	Event
1860	Feb 26	Hundreds of Wiyot people are massacred by white settlers along the coast of what is now Humboldt County, California.
1860	Apr 14	The Pony Express completes its first westbound and eastbound deliveries between St. Joseph, Missouri and San Francisco, California.
1860	May 6	The kidnapping of two Paiute children by the white owners of a Pony Express station in what is now Nevada provokes a retaliatory raid in which five people are killed, beginning the Pyramid Lake War.
1860	May 29	A frontier Army outpost on the Pawnee River in western Kansas Territory is rebuilt three miles upstream of its original location and renamed Fort Larned.
1860	Jul 20	Construction begins on Fort Churchill in what is now western Nevada.
1860	Dec 18	Texas Rangers under Lawrence Sullivan "Sul" Ross attack a Comanche camp at the Battle of Pease River, where they discover Cynthia Ann Parker 24 years after her kidnapping.
1861	Jan 29	Kansas is admitted to the Union as the 34th U.S. state, and a free state.
1861	Feb	A series of hostilities involving U.S. Army Lt. George Nicholas Bascom and Chiricahua Apache chief Cochise triggers the Chiricahua Wars, which remain a central conflict in Arizona and New Mexico for the next 25 years.
1861	Feb 1	A convention of the Texas legislature votes to secede from the Union.
1861	Feb 28	Colorado is organized as a U.S. territory.
1861	Mar 2	The Nevada Territory and Dakota Territory are organized.
1861	Mar 16	Governor of Texas Sam Houston is evicted from office for refusing to take an oath of loyalty to the Confederate States of America.
1861	Mar 28	The southern half of the New Mexico Territory nominally joins the Confederacy as the Provisional Confederate Territory of Arizona.
1861	Jul 25	American Civil War: 250 Confederate troops led by John R. Baylor engage Union forces under Isaac Lynde at Mesilla, New Mexico, resulting in Lynde's troops retreating into the Organ Mountains, toward Fort Stanton. Lynde is relieved of duty after abandoning his post.
1861	Sep 2	Apache Wars: A small Confederate patrol from Fort Stanton is ambushed by Mescalero Apache warriors in New Mexico's Gallinas Mountains.
1861	Oct 24	The first transcontinental telegraph line is completed near Fort Bridger in present-day Wyoming, the result of an effort by Hiram Sibley and Western Union to connect California to the telegraph networks of the east. The ability to instantaneously send messages from coast to coast immediately makes the Pony Express obsolete.
1862	Winter	Months of record precipitation in the far west culminate in the Great Flood of 1862, which turns California's Central Valley into an inland sea and causes millions of dollars in property damage.
1862	Feb–Apr	American Civil War: Confederate forces under Henry Hopkins Sibley and Thomas Green undertake one of the most ambitious military operations of the war when they begin the New Mexico Campaign. Their goals include seizing the Colorado gold fields and securing roads by which to invade California and Mexico.
1862	Feb 20–21	American Civil War: The Battle of Valverde is fought at a ford of Valverde Creek in present-day New Mexico, resulting in a Confederate victory.
1862	Mar 7–8	American Civil War: Union forces under Gen. Samuel R. Curtis defeat Confederate forces under Gen. Earl Van Dorn at the Battle of Pea Ridge in northwest Arkansas.
1862	Mar 26–28	American Civil War: The Battle of Glorieta Pass is fought in the Sangre de Cristo Mountains between Confederate cavalry forces and Union volunteers from Colorado and New Mexico. It marks a turning point in the New Mexico Campaign in favor of the Union.
1862	Mar 30	American Civil War: The Battle of Stanwix Station is fought at a Butterfield Overland Mail stagecoach stop 80 miles east of Yuma, Arizona between Capt. William P. Calloway of the California Column and Confederate 2nd Lt. Jack Swilling.
1862	Apr 6–9	Owens Valley Indian War: Settlers of California's Owens Valley engage native Mono, Shoshone, and Kawaiisu people at the Battle of Bishop Creek and the Battle of Mayfield Canyon.
1862	Apr 15	American Civil War: The Battle of Picacho Pass is fought between the 1st California Cavalry under Union Lt. James Barrett and a detachment of Arizona Confederates led by Sgt. Henry Holmes. It is often considered the westernmost battle of the war, occurring 50 miles northwest of Tucson.
1862	May 5	Apache Wars: In the First Battle of Dragoon Springs, Confederate Sgt. Sam Ford and his men are ambushed by Apache warriors led by Cochise in the Dragoon Mountains, near present-day Benson, Arizona.
1862	May 9	Apache Wars: In retaliation for the deaths of the four Confederates killed in the ambush four days earlier, rebels under Capt. Sherod Hunter take back the cattle stolen by Cochise and his warriors and kill five Apaches in the Second Battle of Dragoon Springs.
1862	May 20	The Homestead Act of 1862 is signed into law by President Abraham Lincoln. It aims to encourage settlement in the West by simplifying the process of land acquisition: homesteaders need only claim, occupy for five years, and improve a minimum of 160 acres of unappropriated land to be granted full ownership. Alternatively, settlers have the option of purchasing the land outright after six months of residency.
1862	Jul 1	The first of the Pacific Railroad Acts is signed into law by President Lincoln, authorizing the issuance of land grants, government bonds, and rights-of-way to two newly incorporated railroad companies, Union Pacific and Central Pacific, for the purpose of constructing the western half of the nation's first transcontinental railroad. The proposed route spans nearly 2,000 miles across the country's interior, connecting to existing rail networks at Council Bluffs, Iowa, and Sacramento, California.
1862	Jul 15–16	Apache Wars: 140 Union troops from the California Column are ambushed by 500 Apaches under Mangas Coloradas and Cochise at the Battle of Apache Pass in Arizona's Chiricahua Mountains. It is one of the first battles in which the United States Army is able to effectively use artillery against Indians. Fort Bowie is built near the site following the battle.
1862	Aug 10	American Civil War: More than 30 people are killed when a group of Unionist German Texan settlers fleeing the Texas Hill Country for Mexico is attacked by a Confederate detachment along the Nueces River.
1862	Aug 17	The Dakota War of 1862 begins when a Sioux hunting party slaughters five white settlers and the tribal council decides to attack white settlements throughout the Minnesota River valley.
1862	Oct 26	Fort Douglas is established three miles east of Salt Lake City in the Utah Territory.
1862	Nov 5	More than 300 Santee Sioux in Minnesota are sentenced to hang for the rape and murder of white settlers.
1863	Jan 1	Daniel Freeman submits the first claim under the Homestead Act of 1862 for land near Beatrice, Nebraska.
1863	Jan 18	Apache Wars: Chiricahua Apache leader Mangas Coloradas is captured, tortured, and killed by U.S. Army sentries after meeting with Brigadier General Joseph Rodman West to call for peace.
1863	Jan 29	Soldiers under Patrick Edward Connor attack an encampment of Shoshone Indians in present-day Idaho, resulting in the Bear River Massacre.
1863	Feb 24	The Arizona Territory is organized from a portion of the New Mexico Territory.
1863	Mar 4	Idaho is organized as a U.S. territory.
1863	Aug 21	Confederate guerrillas led by William Quantrill set fire to the pro-Union town of Lawrence, Kansas and kill nearly 200 civilians in the Lawrence massacre. Quantrill claims his motive was revenge for the Sacking of Osceola several years earlier.
1863	Aug 25	In the aftermath of the Lawrence massacre, Union General Thomas Ewing Jr. issues General Order No. 11, which forces the expulsion of all residents who cannot prove their allegiance to the Union from four counties in rural western Missouri.
1863	Sep 1	American Civil War: In the Battle of Devil's Backbone, Union troops under Gen. Frederick Steele regain control of the military garrison at Fort Smith, Arkansas and occupy it for the remainder of the war.
1863	Oct 23	San Francisco Fire of 1863: Hundreds of Russian sailors join the city fire department in battling a major conflagration which destroys part of downtown San Francisco, California.
1864		John Bozeman leads a group of about 2,000 settlers along the Bozeman Trail, a new cutoff route connecting the Oregon Trail with the gold fields of southwestern Montana, which he and John Jacobs had blazed the previous year.
1864	Jan	Kit Carson accepts the surrender of most of the Navajo nation after the final two years of the bloody Navajo Wars.
1864	Jan 10	Henry Plummer, the elected sheriff of Bannack, Montana, is arrested and summarily hanged by a vigilance committee on charges of leading a gang of road agents preying on traders from Virginia City.
1864	May 26	Montana is organized as a U.S. territory.
1864	Jul	American Civil War: Outlaw Jim Reynolds and his gang plunder and rob settlements in the South Park Basin of the Colorado Territory in an attempt to loot the gold mines of the region to support the fledgling Confederacy.
1864	Sep 27	American Civil War: Pro-Confederate bushwhackers led by William "Bloody Bill" Anderson capture and execute 24 unarmed Union soldiers at a rail depot in Centralia, Missouri.
1864	Sep 28	Cheyenne, Lakota, and Arapaho leaders including Black Kettle meet with Governor of the Colorado Territory John Evans and Col. John Chivington of the U.S. Army in a peace conference at Camp Weld.
1864	Oct 23	American Civil War: Union General Samuel R. Curtis' Army of the Border decisively defeats Confederate General Sterling Price's Army of Missouri at the Battle of Westport, near Kansas City. The battle ends the last major Confederate offensive west of the Mississippi River. The largest engagement in the Trans-Mississippi Theater, with over 30,000 men involved, it is sometimes called the "Gettysburg of the West".
1864	Oct 25	American Civil War: In consecutive engagements only hours apart, Union cavalry under Alfred Pleasonton pursue and defeat Confederate forces under Sterling Price at Marais des Cygnes, Mine Creek, and Marmiton River as they retreat through Kansas and Missouri.
1864	Oct 31	Nevada is admitted as the 36th U.S. state.
1864	Nov 29	Volunteer militia under the command of John Chivington massacre more than 150 Cheyenne people, mostly women and children, at a peaceful village on reservation land in the southeastern Colorado Territory, in what is later called the Sand Creek massacre.
1865	Jan 7	Colorado War: In the Battle of Julesburg, an alliance of more than 1,000 Cheyenne, Lakota, and Arapaho warriors attack and plunder the town of Julesburg, Colorado, defeating the soldiers and civilians defending it. They proceed to burn stagecoach stations and destroy telegraph lines throughout the South Platte valley over the next few weeks.
1865	Feb 4–6	Colorado War: The Battle of Mud Springs is fought in the Nebraska Territory.
1865	Feb 8–9	Colorado War: The Battle of Rush Creek is fought in the Nebraska Territory.
1865	Feb 17	Apache Wars: Fort Buchanan is overrun and destroyed by Chiricahua warriors in the Arizona Territory.
1865	Apr 1	The steamboat Bertrand sinks after snagging on a submerged log in the Missouri River north of Omaha, Nebraska.
1865	Apr 10	Fort Dodge is established at a natural ford of the Arkansas River in southwestern Kansas in order to protect the route of the Santa Fe Trail.
1865	May 12–13	American Civil War: The Battle of Palmito Ranch is fought near Brownsville, Texas. It is the final armed engagement of the war.
1865	Jun 23	American Civil War: Stand Watie, a Cherokee cavalry commander in the Confederate Army, becomes the last Confederate general to surrender to Union forces, at Doaksville in the Indian Territory.
1865	Jul 21	"Wild Bill" Hickok kills gambler Davis Tutt in a shootout in Springfield, Missouri. The confrontation is sensationalized in Harper's Magazine, making Hickok a household name. It is often considered the archetypal one-on-one quick-draw duel, which later becomes a popular image of the Old West.
1865	Jul 26	Thousands of Cheyenne and Lakota warriors attack an Army camp on the North Platte River in what is now Casper, Wyoming at the Battle of Platte Bridge Station.
1866	Feb 13	Ex-Confederate bushwhackers Frank and Jesse James rob their first bank, the Clay County Savings Association in Liberty, Missouri.
1866	Spring	The period of the great cattle drives begins when Texas ranchers drive more than 260,000 head of cattle to assorted markets. Some travel east to Louisiana, where the animals are shipped to Cairo, Illinois and St. Louis; others travel west to Fort Sumner, New Mexico and Denver, inaugurating the Goodnight-Loving Trail. But the vast majority follow the Shawnee Trail north to Kansas City or Sedalia, Missouri.
1866	Jun 15	The U.S. Army selects a site for Fort Buford in the Dakota Territory, which is immediately and repeatedly attacked by Lakota Indians during the fort's construction.
1866	Jul 25	Fort Sully is re-established about 30 miles north of its former location in what is now South Dakota.
1866	Nov 17	Fort Harker is established to replace Fort Ellsworth in central Kansas.
1866	Dec 21	Captain William J. Fetterman and 80 soldiers of the U.S. 2nd Cavalry and 18th Infantry regiments are ambushed and wiped out by Lakota, Cheyenne, and Arapaho warriors near Fort Phil Kearny, Wyoming. A fort built the next year, Fort Fetterman, is named in his honor.
1867	Mar 1	Nebraska is admitted as the 37th U.S. state.
1867	Mar 30	The United States purchases Alaska from the Russian Empire for $7.2 million.
1867	Apr 20	While traveling along the Yellowstone River to Fort C. F. Smith, trailblazer John Bozeman is murdered under mysterious circumstances.
1867	Jun	Fort Stevenson is established on the Missouri River in the Dakota Territory.
1867	Jun 25	Lucien B. Smith of Kent, Ohio is issued the first patent for barbed wire fencing, an invention which revolutionizes cattle ranching on the open prairies of the West.
1867	Jul 17	Fort Totten is established on the shores of Devils Lake in the Dakota Territory.
1867	Jul 31	Fort Griffin is established in north Texas.
1867	Aug 1	Red Cloud's War: In the Hayfield Fight, a civilian haycutting crew and a small U.S. Army detachment from nearby Fort C. F. Smith, armed with new rapid-fire breech-loading rifles, manage to hold off an attack from several hundred Cheyenne, Arapaho, and Lakota warriors.
1867	Aug 2	Red Cloud's War: In the Wagon Box Fight, a small party of U.S. Army soldiers and civilians near Fort Phil Kearny, well-armed and encircled by a wall of wagon boxes, manages to hold off hundreds of Lakota warriors led by Red Cloud and Crazy Horse.
1867	Aug 7	Cheyenne Indians derail a westbound Union Pacific train on the unfinished transcontinental railroad near Plum Creek, Nebraska, killing three railroad workers, then burn and loot the boxcars.
1867	Aug 27	Fort Ellis is established near present-day Bozeman, Montana.
1867	Oct 18	At a ceremony in Sitka, Alaska, Russian soldiers officially transfer Alaska to the U.S. Army on Castle Hill. It is organized on the same day into the Department of Alaska, to be administered by the Army.
1867	Oct 21–28	The Medicine Lodge Treaty is signed between the U.S. government and several southern Plains Indian tribes, requiring that the tribes relocate to the Indian Territory.
1867	Dec 10	Construction begins on Fort Concho in southwest Texas.
1868	Apr 29	The Treaty of Fort Laramie (1868) is signed between the United States and several bands of Lakota, Dakota, and Arapaho Indians. It results in the abandonment of U.S. military outposts along the Bozeman Trail, the indefinite closure of the Powder River Country and western South Dakota to white settlement, and the end of Red Cloud's War.
1868	Jul 25	Wyoming is organized as a U.S. territory.
1868	Sep 17–19	A company of civilian frontiersmen under George A. Forsyth is surrounded and besieged by hundreds of Cheyenne, Arapaho, and Lakota on a small sandbar in the Arikaree River, but their superior armaments hold the position until scouts can escape to Fort Wallace, more than 70 miles to the east, to summon reinforcements. Famed Cheyenne warrior Roman Nose is killed during the battle.
1868	Nov 18	Fort Supply is established as a U.S. Army camp in the Indian Territory.
1868	Nov 27	The Battle of Washita River is fought when Lt. Col. George Armstrong Custer's 7th Cavalry Regiment attacks a winter encampment of Southern Cheyenne Indians on the Washita River in what is now western Oklahoma. Chief Black Kettle, leader of the Cheyenne, is killed.
1868	Dec 5	Camp Sherman, later renamed Fort Omaha, is established near Omaha, Nebraska.
1869	Jan 8	Fort Sill is established by General Philip H. Sheridan in the Indian Territory, near present-day Lawton, Oklahoma.
1869	May 10	Leland Stanford drives the Golden Spike to join the rails of the Central Pacific and Union Pacific railroads at a special ceremony in Promontory Summit, Utah Territory, completing the First transcontinental railroad.
1869	May 24	John Wesley Powell and nine others embark on a scientific expedition that charts more than 930 mi (1,500 km) of the Green River and Colorado River through the canyon country of Wyoming, Colorado, Utah, and Arizona. Powell and his crew become the first recorded white men to travel the length of the Grand Canyon. They reach the mouth of the Virgin River in present-day Nevada on August 30.
1869	Jul 4	The world's first documented competitive rodeo is held in the town of Deer Trail in the Colorado Territory.
1869	Jul 11	The Battle of Summit Springs is fought in the Colorado Territory between elements of the U.S. Army under Eugene A. Carr and a band of Cheyenne Dog Soldiers led by Chief Tall Bull.
1869	Dec 10	Wyoming becomes the first U.S. territory to grant women the right to vote.

== 1870s ==
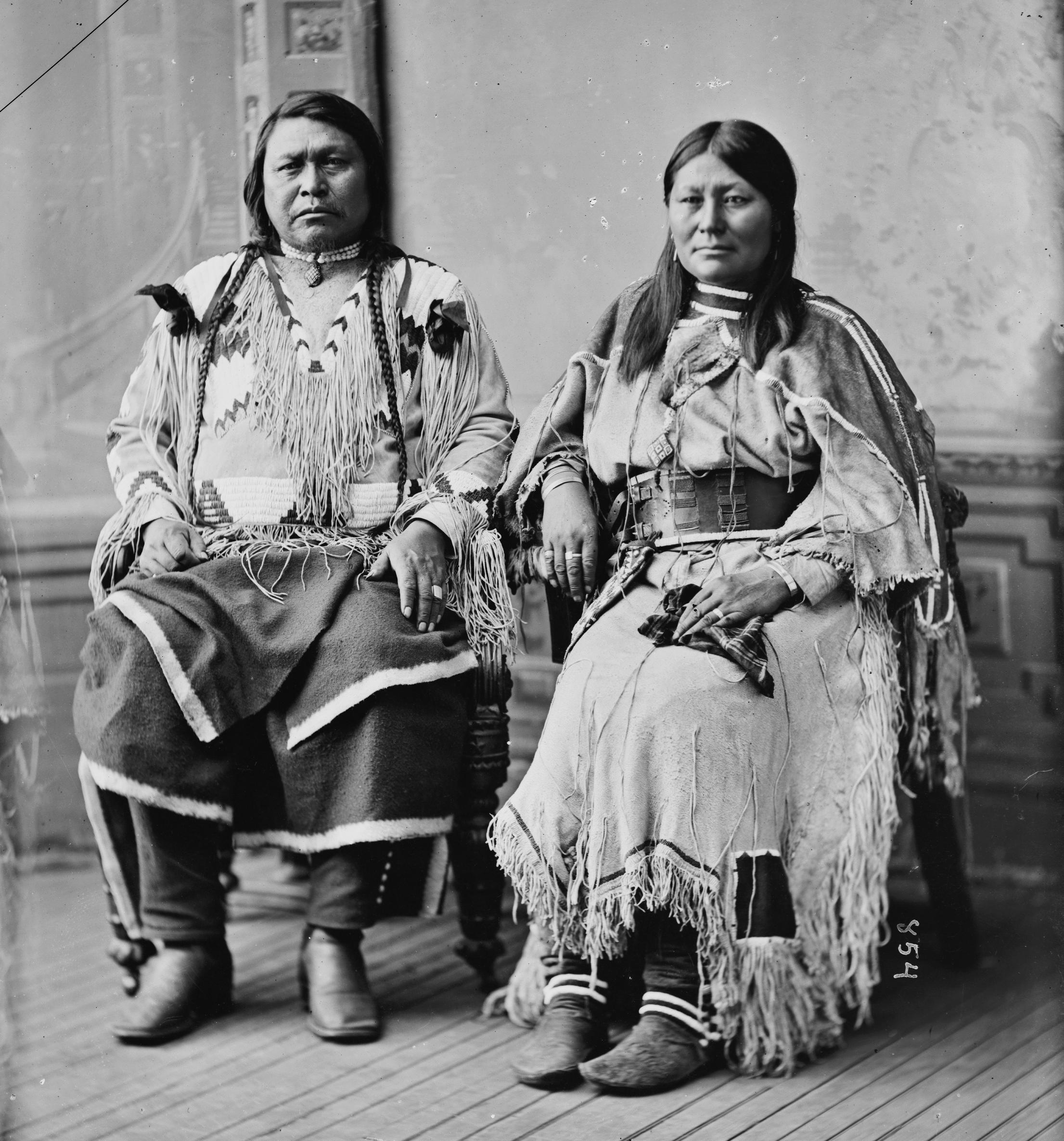
Ouray and Chipeta

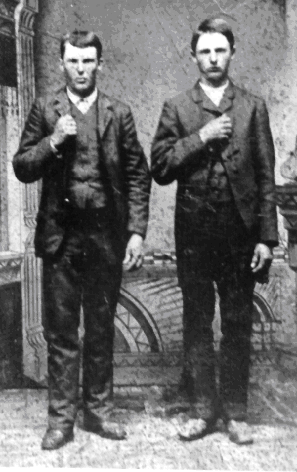
Jesse and Frank James

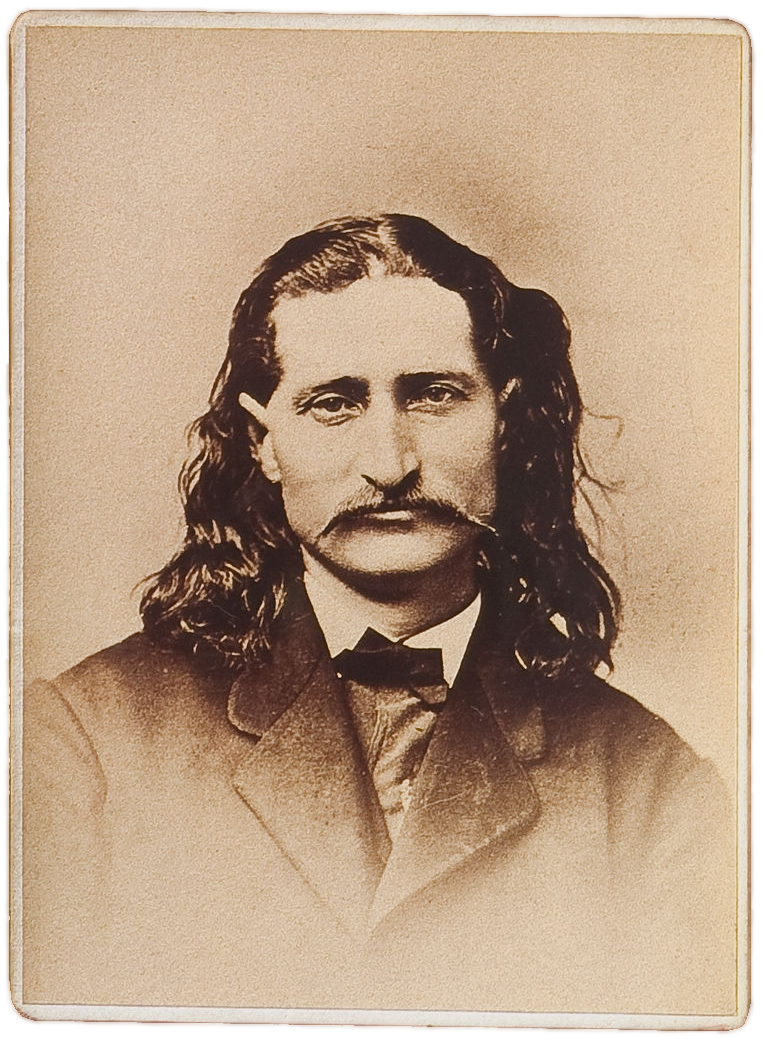
"Wild Bill" Hickok

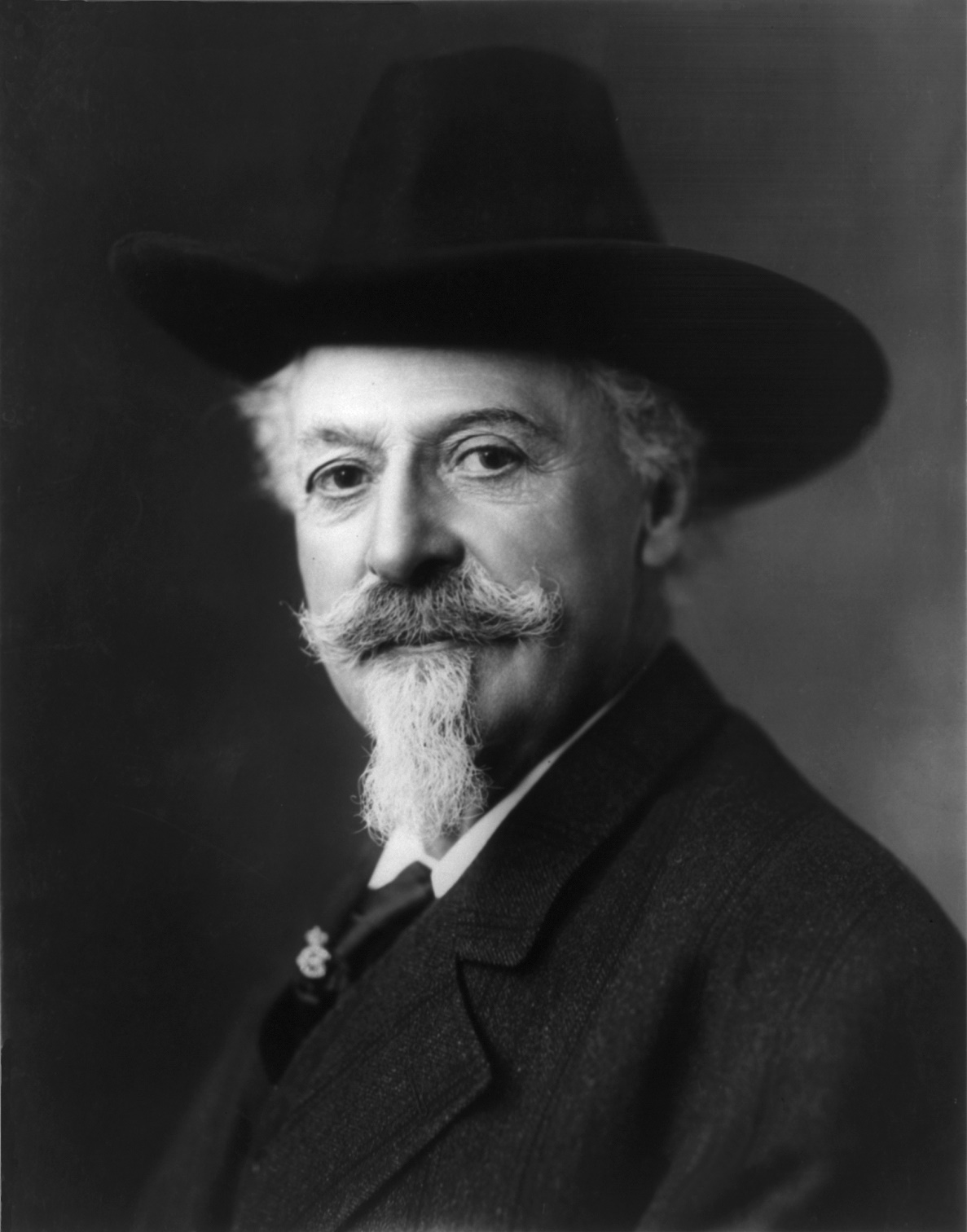
"Buffalo Bill" Cody

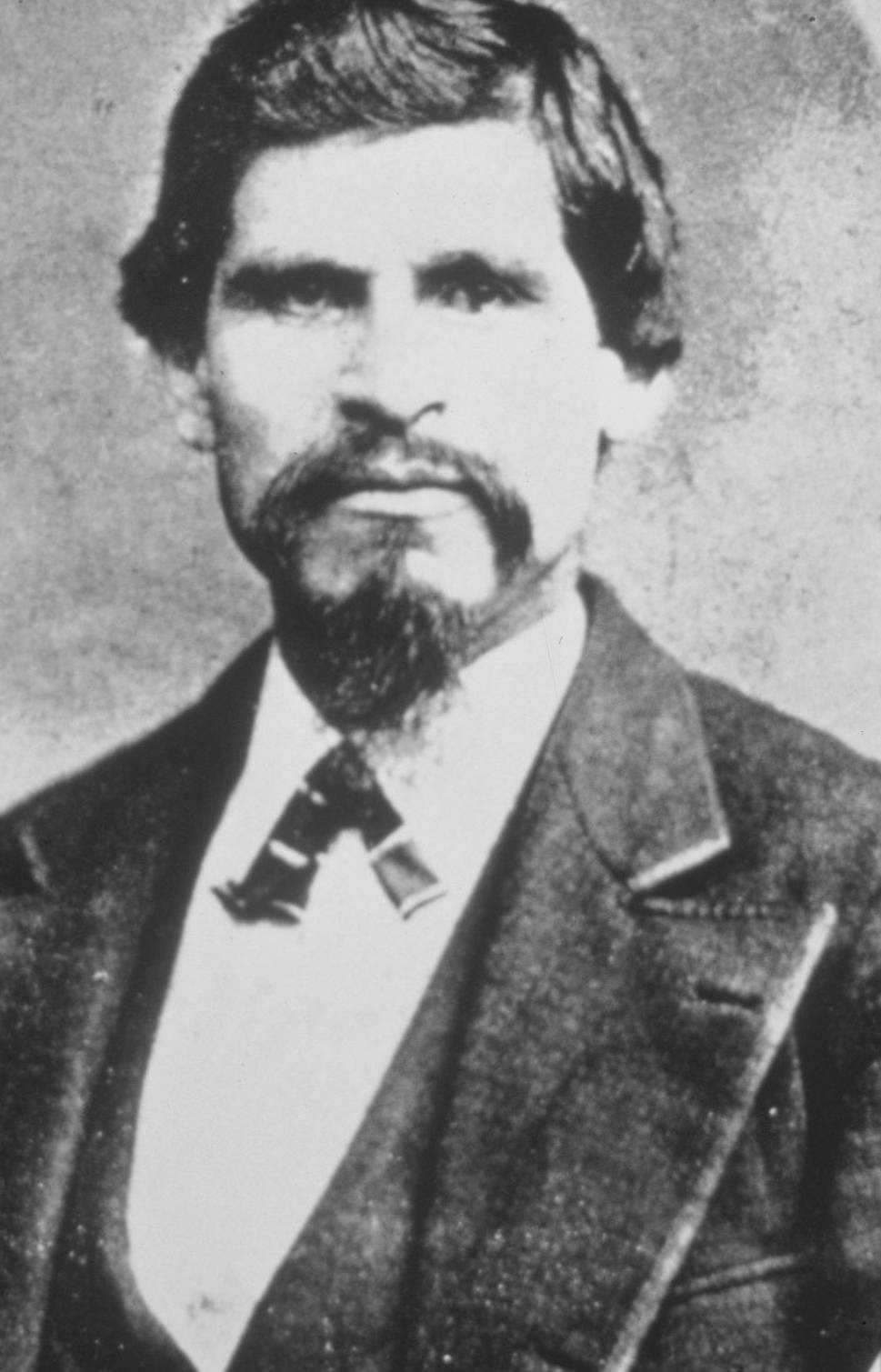
Tiburcio Vásquez

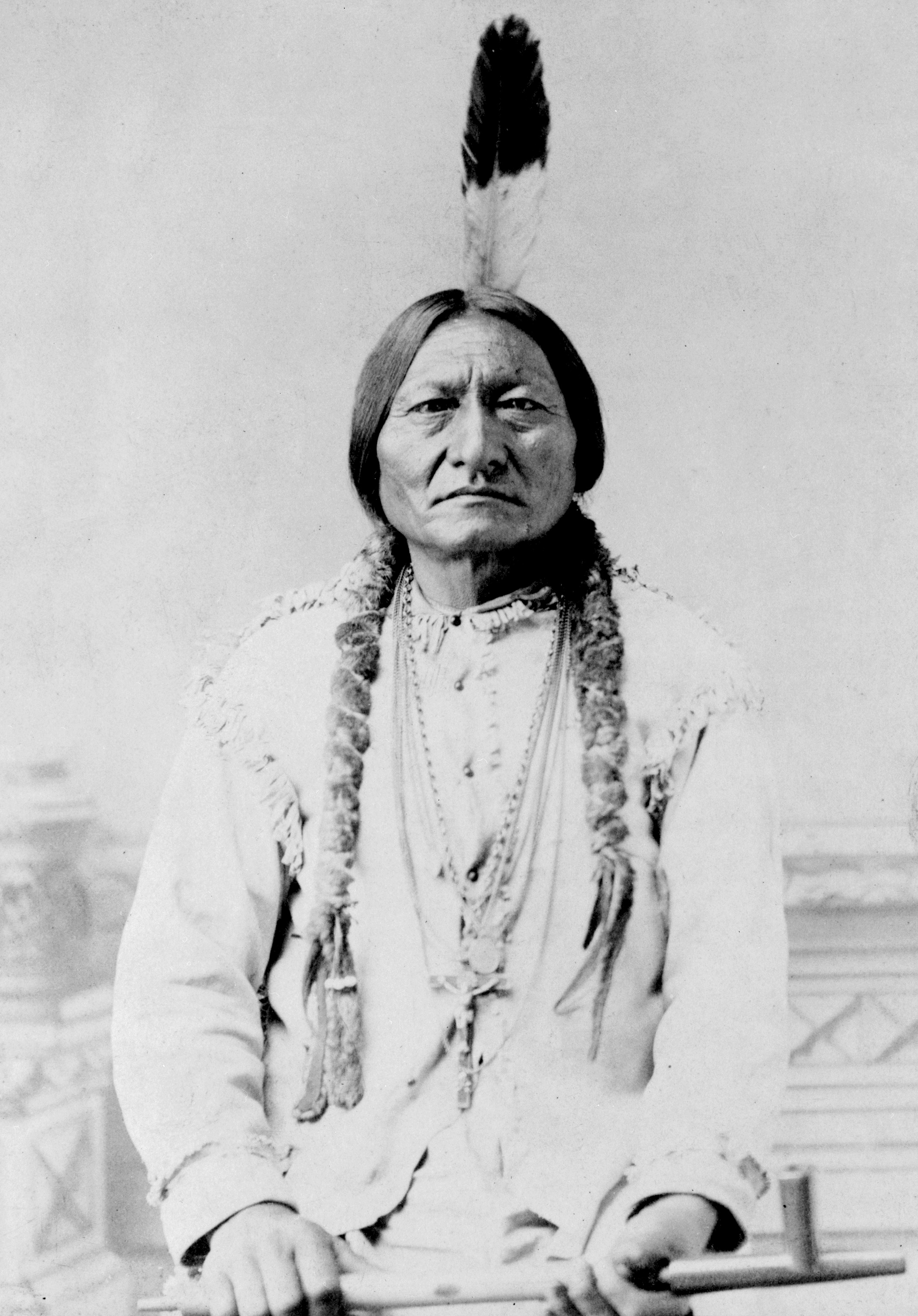
Tȟatȟáŋka Íyotȟake (Sitting Bull)

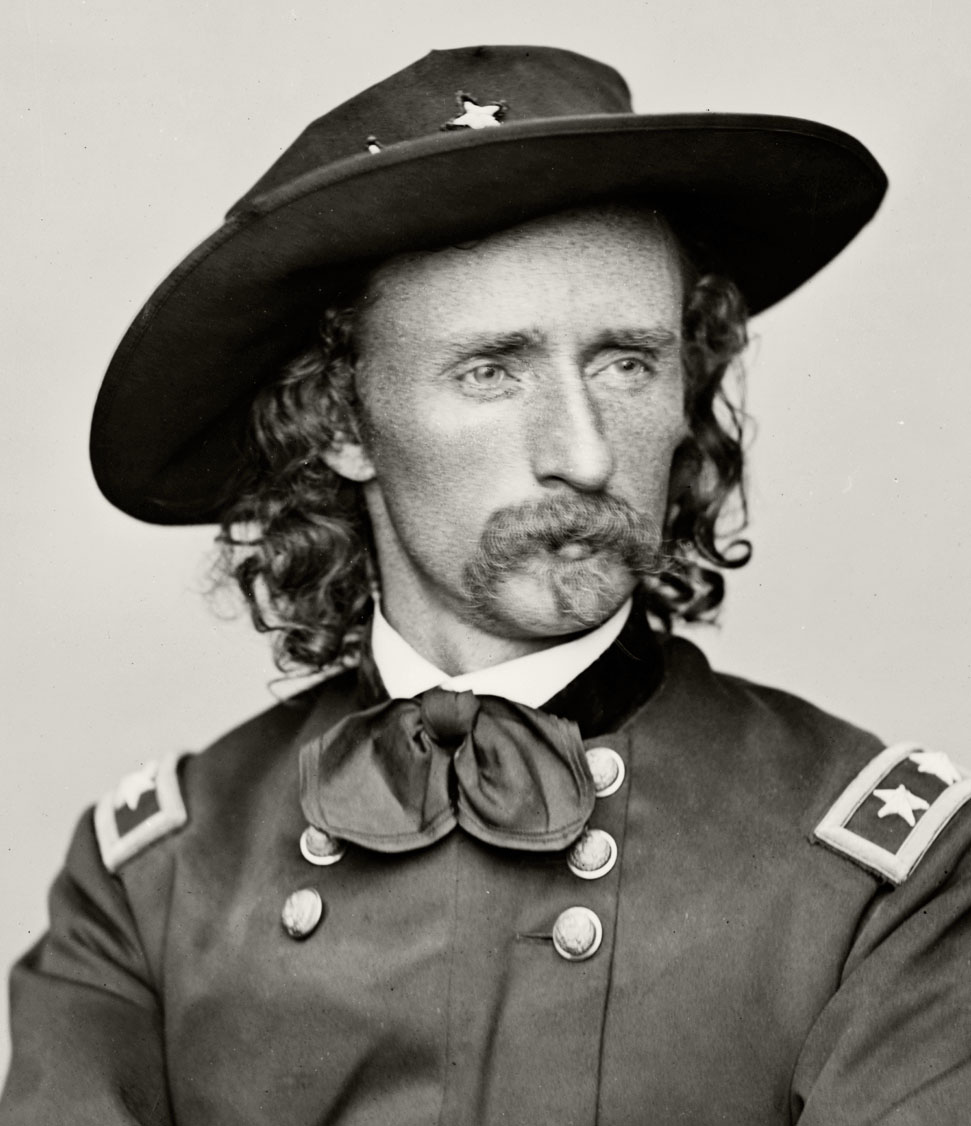
George Armstrong Custer

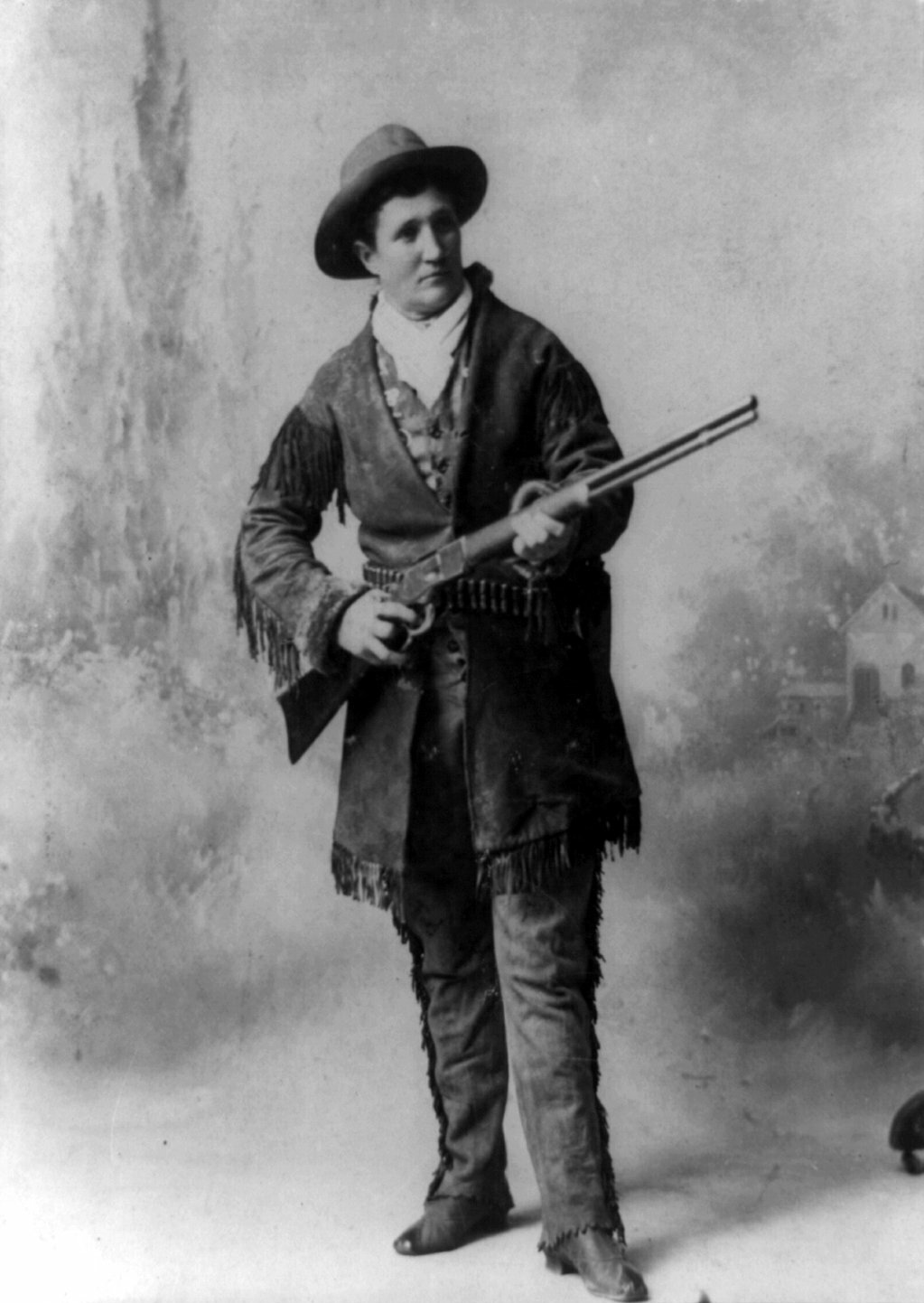
"Calamity Jane"

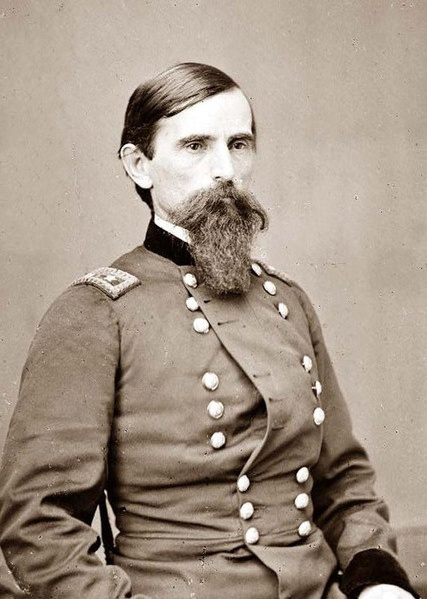
Lew Wallace

Year	Date	Event
1870		Bret Harte's The Luck of Roaring Camp and Other Sketches, a collection of stories based on his years as a San Francisco journalist, is published.
1870		William "Hurricane Bill" Martin, a notorious outlaw in Kansas, begins rustling cattle southeast of Abilene before he and his gang are driven off by a posse from Marion.
1870		Settling in the New Mexico Territory, gunfighter Robert Clay Allison purchases a ranch in Colfax County. According to local newspapers, Allison is reported to have killed as many as fifteen men in gunfights during this time.
1870		With the growing railroad industry and cattle boom, buffalo hunters begin moving onto the Great Plains. In less than ten years, the buffalo population is dramatically reduced, and the animal remains an endangered species for much of the next century.
1870		The Utah Territorial Assembly, supported by Brigham Young, grants women the right to vote. Over the next several decades, this provides Mormons with an added margin of political power.
1870	Jan	Shortly after leaving the post of sheriff of Ellis County, Kansas, "Wild Bill" Hickok travels to Missouri and eventually resumes his duties as a U.S. Marshal.
1870	Jan 23	More than 200 men, women, and children belonging to a friendly band of Piegan Blackfeet Indians are mistakenly attacked and massacred by a U.S. Army command on the Marias River in the Montana Territory.
1870	Mar 30	Texas is readmitted to the Union following the Civil War.
1870	Spring	With the emergence of Abilene, Kansas as a major stopover for cattle ranchers, the town trustees attempt to curb the violence brought by the beginning of the cattle season by banning guns within town limits. This proves extremely unpopular and unenforceable, as Texas cowboys make a habit of shooting up ordinance posters and tear down the city's first jailhouse; violence continues in the city until the appointment of Tom "Bear River" Smith as city marshal on June 4.
1870	Jul 17–18	"Wild Bill" Hickok is involved in a shootout with several members of the U.S. 7th Cavalry Regiment in Hays City after killing one trooper and wounding another.
1870	Nov 2	Abilene City Marshal Tom "Bear River" Smith is killed while serving an arrest warrant near the town.
1871		John K. "King" Fisher is hired by settlers of the Pendencia River country in Dimmit County, Texas to protect their livestock and other property. It is during this time that Fisher becomes known as a skilled gunfighter.
1871	Jan 1	After a long illness, U.S. Army Captain John Barry is forced into retirement. While stationed at Fort Ord, Barry attempts to improve relations between the United States and the Apaches, as well as encourages the enlistment of scouts to combat renegade Apaches.
1871	Feb 16	John Younger kills Captain S.W. Nichols in a gunfight in Dallas, Texas.
1871	Feb 23	While heading an Apache-hunting force near present-day Clifton, Arizona, John M. Bullard is shot and killed when he approaches a wounded Apache warrior.
1871	Feb 28	"Handsome Jack" John Ledford, an outlaw-turned-hotel-owner involved in counterfeiting and horse theft in Kansas and the Indian Territory, is killed in a shootout with a group of U.S. Army soldiers led by scout Lee Stewart and U.S. Marshal Jack Bridges, who claimed to have a warrant for his arrest.
1871	Mar 16	Death of Navajo chieftain Barboncito (Hastin Daagii).
1871	Apr 15	"Wild Bill" Hickok succeeds Tom "Bear River" Smith as city marshal of Abilene, Kansas and remains in the position until December 13.
1871	Apr 28	In what becomes known as the Camp Grant Massacre, over 100 Apache women and children are killed by a mob of Mexicans and Papago Indians led by several Tucson businessmen, including D.A. Bennett and Sam Hughes. Bennett and several others are indicted in December, though all are acquitted.
1871	Jun 14	Thomas Carson, reportedly a nephew of Kit Carson, is appointed to the Abilene police force under City Marshal "Wild Bill" Hickok. After an incident with gunfighter John Wesley Hardin over Hardin's insistence on wearing his gun in public, Carson is hired briefly as deputy in Newton, Kansas before returning to Abilene in November. Carson and Deputy John W. "Brocky Jack" Norton are fired from the police force on November 27 after assaulting a bartender.
1871	Jun 30	Shortly after robbing a nearby bank, Jesse James addresses a crowd at a political rally in Corydon, Iowa.
1871	Oct 5	Professional gambler Phil Coe is involved in a shootout with Abilene City Marshal "Wild Bill" Hickok after Hickok attempts to censor a painting of a bull with abnormally large genitals in Coe's saloon. Deputy Mike Williams is killed when Hickok accidentally shoots him, and Coe dies from his wounds four days later.
1872		William F. "Buffalo Bill" Cody, a scout for the U.S. 5th Cavalry Regiment, is awarded the Medal of Honor. Later that year, he and fellow scout John "Texas Jack" Omohundro appear on stage for the first time, portraying themselves in "Scouts of the Prairie".
1872		Ellsworth, Kansas succeeds Abilene as the northern stopping point on the Old Texas cattle trail.
1872		Following the completion of the Santa Fe Railroad across the border of the Colorado Territory, the use of the Santa Fe Trail begins to decline, although Dodge City remains a major cattle town for the next decade. The Santa Fe Railroad also completes a rail line at Wichita, Kansas, causing a major population boom in the town over the next several years.
1872	Mar 1	Yellowstone is designated America's first national park by President Ulysses S. Grant.
1872	Jun	Fort McKeen, later renamed Fort Abraham Lincoln, is built in the Dakota Territory.
1872	Nov 29	The Battle of Lost River results when the U.S. 1st Cavalry Regiment tries to force a band of Modoc Indians under Captain Jack to return to the Klamath Reservation in southern Oregon. In the subsequent Modoc War, a party of 53 Modoc warriors entrenched in the Lava Beds of northern California manages to hold off hundreds of U.S. soldiers for more than five months.
1872	Dec 28	Yavapai War: U.S. Army cavalry under George Crook begin a campaign into Arizona's Tonto Basin by defeating the occupants of a Yavapai stronghold at the Battle of Salt River Canyon.
1873		The Colt Single Action Army revolver is first manufactured. It later becomes known as "The Gun That Won the West".
1873	Mar 3	Designed to encourage the cultivation of timber on the treeless Great Plains, the Timber Culture Act is signed into law by President Ulysses S. Grant. A follow-up to the Homestead Act of 1862, it permits homesteaders to claim 160 acres of public land on which they have planted and maintained at least 40 acres of timber for a minimum of 10 years.
1873	Mar 27	Yavapai War: A combined force of U.S. Army soldiers and Apache Scouts wins another major victory over Yavapai and Tonto Apache warriors at the Battle of Turret Peak in central Arizona.
1873	Apr 1	The Coinage Act of 1873 takes effect, prohibiting the minting of silver bullion into legal tender and establishing a federal gold standard by default. The controversial law provokes a debate about national monetary policy that lasts the rest of the century, with proponents of "free silver" and bimetallism, including many silver-mining interests in the West, arguing for the unlimited coinage of silver into money.
1873	Apr 11	Modoc War: After months of inconclusive fighting, U.S. Army Gen. Edward Canby and a civilian peace commissioner are shot and killed during a parley with Captain Jack and several Modoc warriors near their stronghold in the Lava Beds of northern California.
1873	Jun 1	A party of American and Canadian wolf-hunters, drunk off illegal whiskey, crosses the border into Saskatchewan and accuses a band of Assiniboine people of stealing a horse, provoking a skirmish that kills more than a dozen Assiniboine. The incident amplifies Canadian distrust of Americans and urges deployment of the newly created North-West Mounted Police later in the year.
1873	Jul 21	The James–Younger Gang commits the first train robbery in the history of the West by derailing a locomotive of the Rock Island Line west of Adair, Iowa and stealing $3,000 from the express safe and passengers on board.
1873	Oct 3	Captain Jack and three other Modoc warriors are executed at Fort Klamath for their role in the murder of Gen. Canby.
1873	Dec	"My Western Home", a poem by Dr. Brewster M. Higley, is first published in an issue of the Smith County Pioneer. It is set to music by Daniel E. Kelley and evolves into the classic western folk song "Home on the Range", which is later adopted as the state song of Kansas.
1873	Dec 26	Californio bandido Tiburcio Vásquez and his gang loot the town of Kingston in Fresno County, California.
1874		Outlaws Ceberiano and Reymundo Aguilar are killed during the Harrold War of Lincoln County, New Mexico.
1874	Jan 31	The James–Younger Gang robs a general store in the town of Gads Hill, Missouri, and later stops a passenger train, escaping with more than $12,000.
1874	Mar 17	John Younger is killed when he and his brother Jim assault two undercover Pinkerton detectives and a local sheriff in St. Clair County, Missouri.
1874	Jun 27	While occupying an old trading post in the Texas panhandle, 28 bison hunters including 21-year-old Bat Masterson are besieged by 700 Comanche warriors at the Second Battle of Adobe Walls.
1874	Jul 15	Fort Reno is established in the Indian Territory.
1874	Jul–Aug	An expedition led by Lt. Col. George Armstrong Custer embarks from Fort Abraham Lincoln to explore the previously uncharted Black Hills of present-day South Dakota. The expedition discovers placer gold, prompting a gold rush which draws thousands of settlers to the region over the next few years and thereby antagonizes the native Sioux inhabitants.
1874	Sep 9–14	Red River War: A U.S. Army wagon train full of rations destined for Camp Supply is besieged by Comanche and Kiowa warriors for more than five days before the 6th Cavalry rescues it.
1874	Sep 28	Red River War: The 4th U.S. Cavalry under Col. Ranald S. Mackenzie routs a large camp of Cheyenne, Comanche, and Kiowa Indians taking refuge in Palo Duro Canyon in the Texas panhandle.
1874	Nov 24	Joseph Glidden patents a type of barbed wire he calls "The Winner", which becomes one of the most popular types in the country. His design is modified from a version patented by Henry B. Rose that was displayed at a county fair in Glidden's hometown of DeKalb, Illinois.
1874	Dec 8	The James–Younger Gang robs a train on the Kansas Pacific Railroad near Muncie, Kansas, stealing $30,000.
1875	Jan 5	The city of Fargo is incorporated in the Dakota Territory.
1875	Jan 25	Pinkerton agents throw an incendiary device into Jesse James' family home in Kearney, Missouri, killing James' 9-year-old half-brother and badly wounding his mother.
1875	Aug 8	Jermin Aguirre is killed near the San Augin Ranch in the New Mexico Territory.
1875	Nov 19–21	Las Cuevas War: Texas Rangers commanded by Leander McNelly engage Mexican militia in Tamaulipas in an attempt to return stolen cattle to U.S. territory.
1876		After being wounded in the hip during a gunfight in Sweetwater, Texas, Bat Masterson agrees to become assistant city marshal of Dodge City, Kansas.
1876	Mar 17	When Sioux leaders Sitting Bull and Crazy Horse refuse to comply with the United States government's order to leave the Black Hills of the Dakota Territory, an expeditionary force commanded by General George Crook directs Colonel Joseph J. Reynolds to attack a Cheyenne encampment at the Battle of Powder River, thereby beginning the Great Sioux War.
1876	Jun 17	Great Sioux War: General George Crook's forces are defeated by Crazy Horse at the Battle of the Rosebud. The defeat convinces Crook to withdraw from his planned offensive and await reinforcements.
1876	Jun 25	Great Sioux War: While leading an attack into a Sioux village in the Montana Territory, the U.S. 7th Cavalry Regiment under Brig. Gen. George Armstrong Custer is ambushed and massacred by over 2,000 Lakota and Cheyenne warriors led by Sitting Bull and Crazy Horse at the Battle of the Little Bighorn.
1876	Aug 1	Colorado is admitted as the 38th U.S. state.
1876	Aug 2	"Wild Bill" Hickok is shot and killed by Jack McCall during a poker game in Deadwood, Dakota Territory.
1876	Sep 7	Several members of the James–Younger Gang, including Cole Younger, are captured after the failed robbery of the First National Bank leads to a gunfight with bank employees and local residents in Northfield, Minnesota.
1876	Sep 9–10	Great Sioux War: In the first U.S. Army victory since the disaster at the Little Bighorn, a punitive expedition led by George Crook destroys an Oglala Lakota village led by Chief American Horse at the Battle of Slim Buttes in present-day South Dakota.
1877	Apr	The Homestake lode is discovered in the Black Hills of the Dakota Territory. The claim is later sold to George Hearst, who expands and develops it into the largest and most productive gold mine in North America.
1877	May 5	Crazy Horse surrenders to the U.S. Army at the Red Cloud Agency near Fort Robinson, Nebraska.
1877	Jun 17	Anticipating retaliation for recent crimes against white settlers and reluctant to move to a reservation, about 600 Nez Perce Indians led by Chief Joseph, Ollokot, and White Bird begin a long retreat from western Idaho with the U.S. Army in pursuit. They defeat their pursuers at the Battle of White Bird Canyon, and the Nez Perce War begins.
1877	Jun 25	Fort Missoula is established in the Montana Territory.
1877	Aug 9–10	Nez Perce War: The Battle of the Big Hole is fought in the Montana Territory between the Nez Perce and U.S. soldiers under Col. John Gibbon.
1877	Aug 17	At 17 years old, Henry McCarty, later known as "Billy the Kid", shoots his first man, Frank "Windy" Cahill, after Cahill wrestles him to the ground at a saloon near Fort Grant, Arizona. Cahill dies the following day.
1877	Sep 5	Four months after his surrender, Oglala war leader Crazy Horse is fatally stabbed with a bayonet by a U.S. Army soldier while allegedly resisting imprisonment at Fort Robinson.
1877	Sep 18	A gang led by Sam Bass robs a Union Pacific train of more than $60,000 while it is stopped at a remote water station near present-day Big Springs, Nebraska.
1877	Sep 21	Prospector Ed Schieffelin files his first mining claim after discovering silver ore on a high plateau between the San Pedro River and the Dragoon Mountains in southeastern Arizona Territory. He names his stake "Tombstone".
1877	Oct 5	Nez Perce War: Cornered at the Battle of Bear Paw, just 40 miles south of the Canadian border in the Montana Territory, Chief Joseph and his dwindling band of Nez Perce surrender to the U.S. Army under Generals Oliver O. Howard and Nelson A. Miles, ending the war.
1877	Dec 17	In the San Elizario Salt War, years of legal conflict over the application of individual mineral rights to traditionally community-held salt lakes near the Guadalupe Mountains reach a climax when a detachment of Texas Rangers surrenders to a popular army of Tejano citizens following a four-day siege in the town of San Elizario, Texas. More than a dozen people are killed in the exchange.
1878	Jan 22	A gang of outlaws led by Dave Rudabaugh, Mike Roarke, and Dan Dement attempt unsuccessfully to rob a train near Kinsley, Kansas. Rudabaugh is captured the next day by Bat Masterson and a posse including John Joshua Webb.
1878	Feb 18	New Mexico rancher John Tunstall is killed by a posse led by Lincoln County Sheriff William J. Brady, sent to seize attached property after Tunstall fails to pay a debt to rival cattlemen, beginning the Lincoln County War.
1878	Feb 18	The town of Leadville is incorporated in Colorado.
1878	Jun 18	Nick Worthington, a well-known outlaw throughout New Mexico and Colorado, is killed by residents of Cimarron, New Mexico after killing several men and stealing horses.
1878	Jul 15–19	The Battle of Lincoln takes place over five days in Lincoln, New Mexico. Alexander McSween, former partner of John Tunstall, is shot and killed on July 19, along with gunman Francisco Zamora.
1878	Aug 31	Fort Meade is established in the Black Hills of the Dakota Territory to protect against the illegal encroachment of white settlers onto reservation lands.
1879		Ike and Billy Clanton enlist William "Curly Bill" Brocius and Johnny Ringo as they begin cattle rustling in the New Mexico and Arizona Territories.
1879	Jan	Captain Marcus Reno, the highest-ranking officer to have survived the Battle of the Little Bighorn, is brought before a general court-martial but is acquitted of cowardice.
1879	Feb 18	Outlaw Jesse Evans allegedly holds Billy the Kid and Tom O'Folliard at gunpoint as he murders attorney Huston Chapman in Lincoln, New Mexico.
1879	Mar 17	New Mexico Territorial Governor Lew Wallace meets with Billy the Kid in Lincoln, promising him amnesty for his previous crimes in exchange for his testimony regarding Chapman's murder. The Kid is taken into custody on March 21 and later testifies as agreed, but is not released from jail.
1879	Mar 19	While dining in the White House Saloon in Marshall, Texas after a performance, actors Maurice Barrymore and Ben Porter are shot following a confrontation with notorious gunfighter and bully Jim Currie. Porter is killed. Despite both men being unarmed, Currie is found not guilty. Barrymore vows never to return to Texas.
1879	Apr 5	Gambler Frank Loving kills Levi Richardson in a gunfight at the Long Branch Saloon in Dodge City, Kansas.
1879	Jun 17	Concluding that Governor Wallace has deceived him, Billy the Kid escapes from jail in Lincoln, New Mexico.
1879	Sep 26	A fire devastates Deadwood, South Dakota, destroying most of the town's original buildings.
1879	Sep 29	White River War: Nathan Meeker and ten employees of the White River Indian Agency in western Colorado are massacred by Ute Indians when Meeker wires for military assistance in suppressing a perceived uprising. The Utes besiege a U.S. Army detachment in the Battle of Milk Creek until it is relieved by troops under Col. Wesley Merritt on October 5.

== 1880s ==
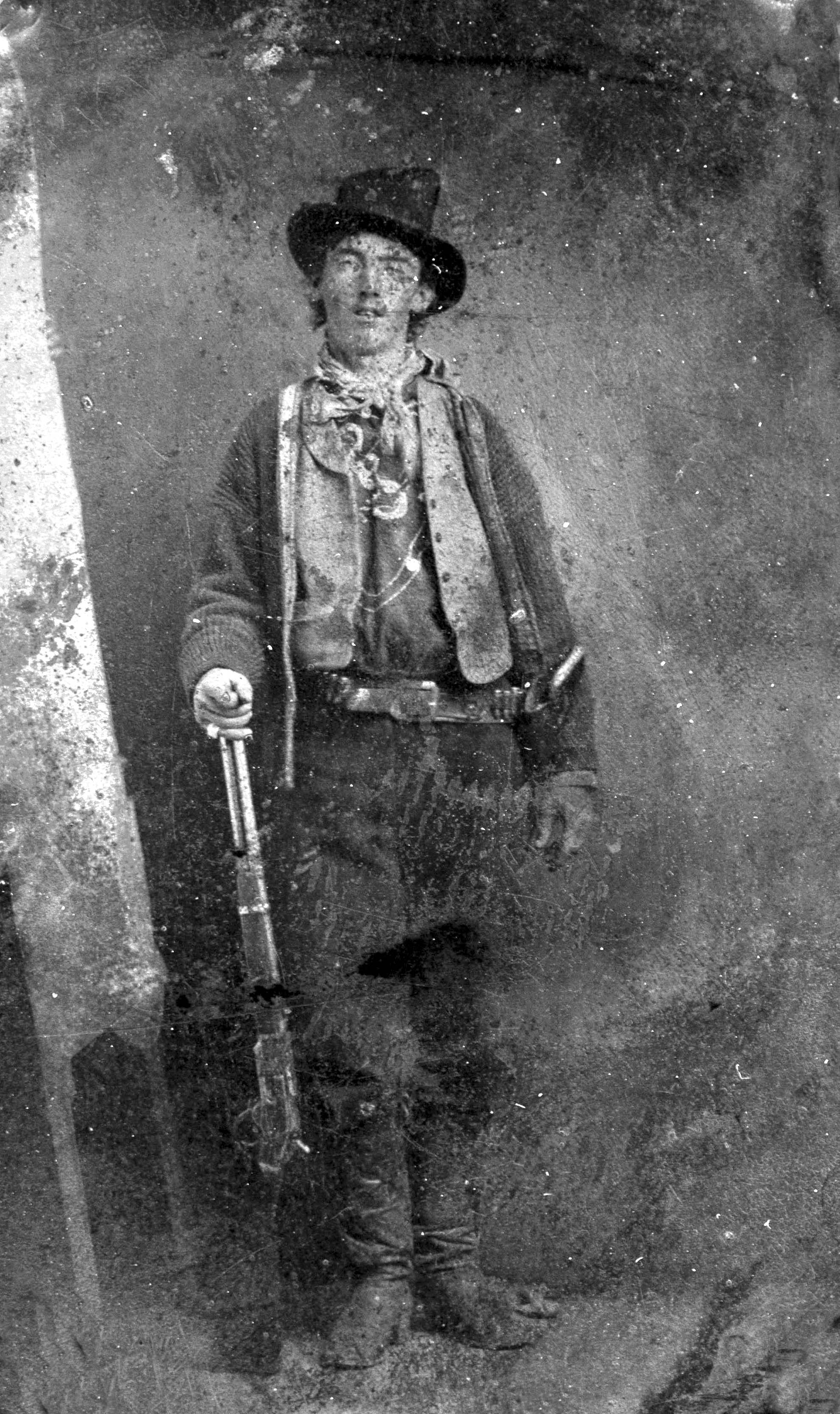
"Billy the Kid"

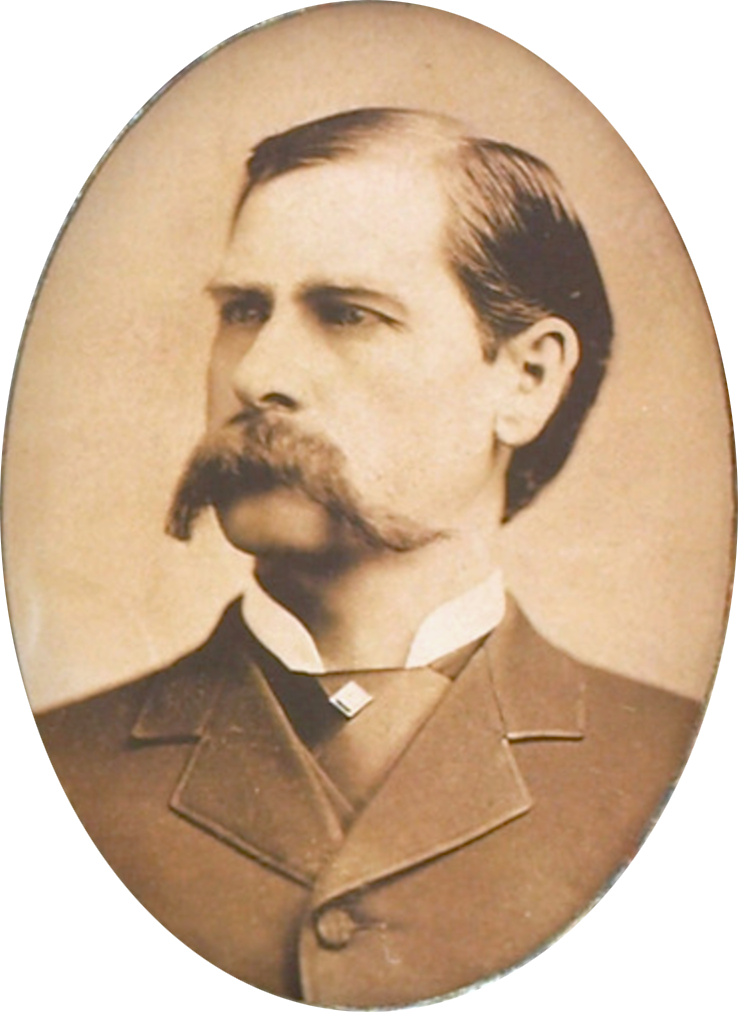
Wyatt Earp

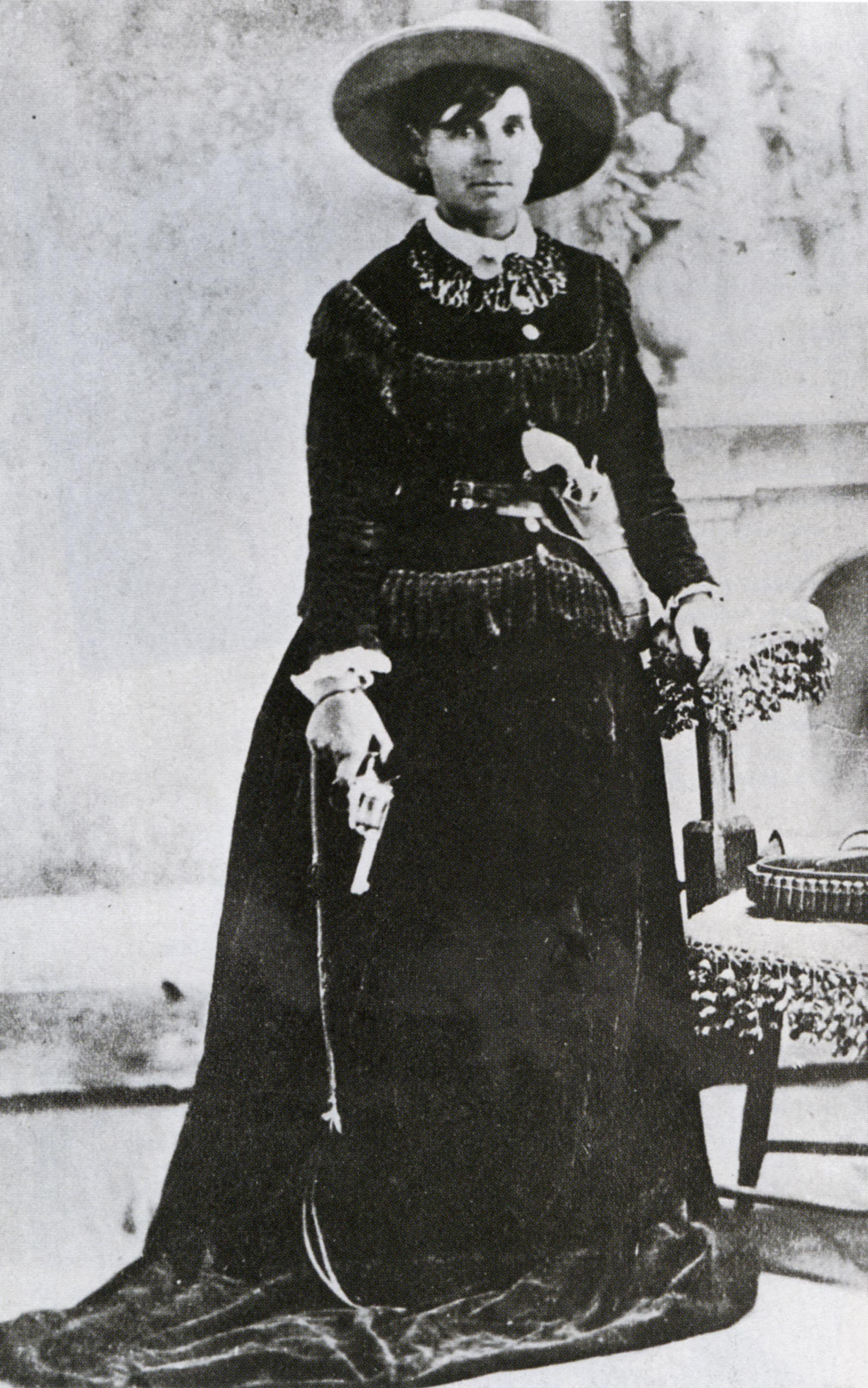
"Belle" Starr

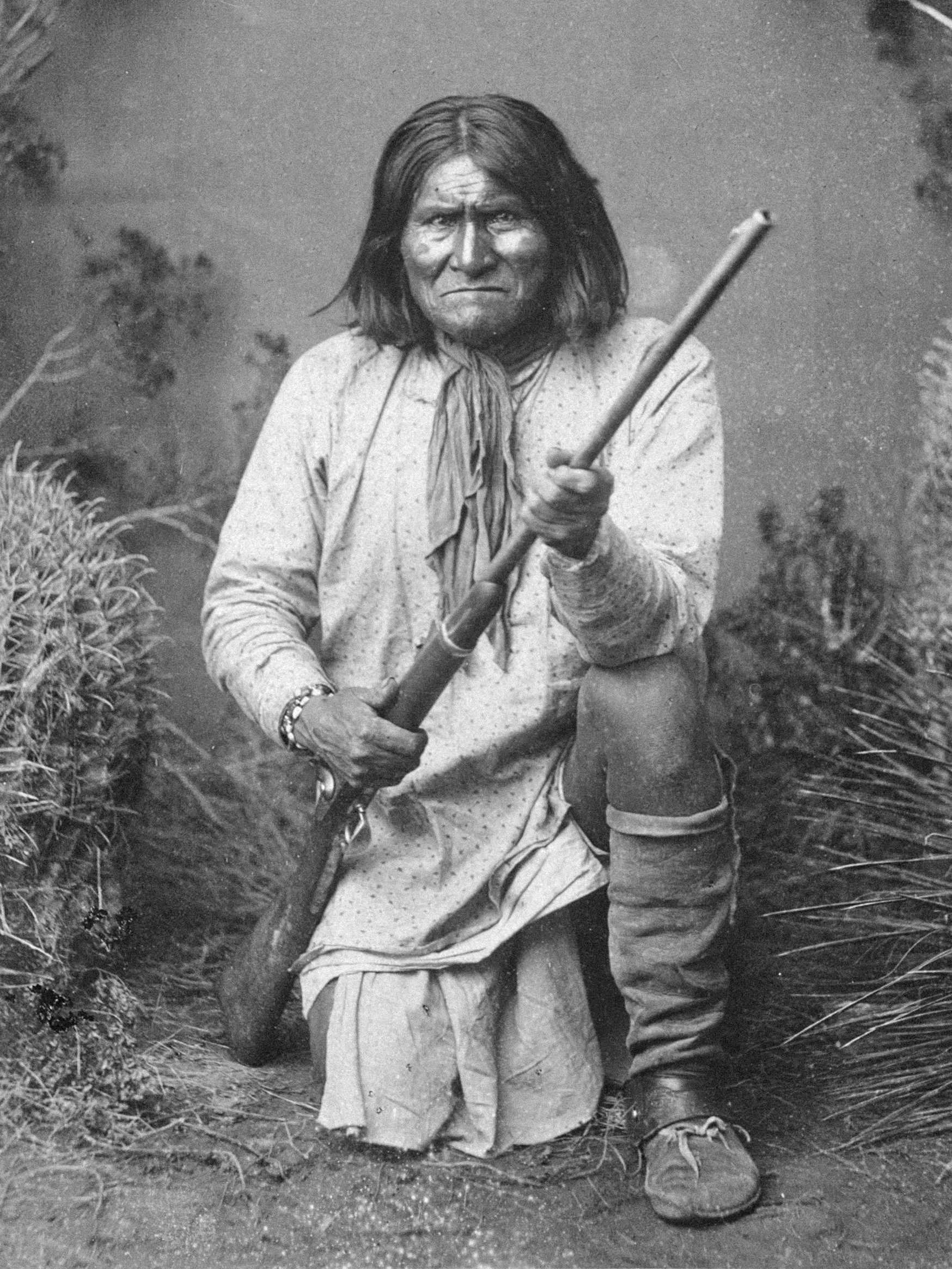
Goyaałé (Geronimo)

Year	Date	Event
1880		George Alford is sentenced to five years imprisonment for murdering a sheriff in Fort Worth, Texas.
1880	Mar 2	James Allen kills James Moorehead after ordering eggs in a tavern in Las Vegas, New Mexico and, after escaping from prison for Moorehead's murder, is killed by a posse.
1880	Apr 15	The first widely popular incarnation of the Farmers' Alliance, an agrarian reform movement, is founded in Chicago by George Milton through his periodical Western Rural and quickly builds a membership across the Midwest and Plains.
1880	Apr 22	The U.S. Army begins construction on Fort Niobrara in north-central Nebraska.
1880	May 1	The Tombstone Epitaph prints its first issue in Tombstone, Arizona. It remains the oldest continuously published newspaper in the state.
1880	May 11	A dispute over land titles between settlers of California's San Joaquin Valley and the Southern Pacific Railroad leaves seven people dead in what is later called the Mussel Slough Tragedy.
1880	Oct 30	Marshal Fred White dies in Tombstone, Arizona after being accidentally shot in the groin two days earlier, attempting to disarm 'Curly' Bill Brocius.
1880	Dec 19	Tom O'Folliard, best friend of Billy the Kid, is shot and killed by members of Pat Garrett's posse in Fort Sumner, New Mexico.
1880	Dec 23	Charlie Bowdre, a member of Billy the Kid's gang, is shot and killed by members of Pat Garrett's posse at Stinking Springs, New Mexico.
1880	Dec 24	Abran Baca kills A.M. Conklin in Socorro, New Mexico with several other outlaws, though he is acquitted the following year.
1881	Feb 5	The city of Phoenix is incorporated in the Arizona Territory.
1881	Feb 25	Luke Short shoots and kills well-known gambler and gunfighter Charlie Storms in self-defense following an altercation in Tombstone, Arizona Territory.
1881	Apr 14	A gunfight involving El Paso, Texas Marshal Dallas Stoudenmire results in what witnesses recall as "four dead in five seconds".
1881	Jul 14	Billy the Kid is shot and killed by Sheriff Pat Garrett in Fort Sumner, New Mexico. He is buried the next day between his friends Tom O'Folliard and Charlie Bowdre in the town's old military cemetery.
1881	Aug 5	Crow Dog, a Lakota subchief on the Great Sioux Reservation, shoots and kills Chief Spotted Tail. Though the matter is settled by tribal custom, Crow Dog is sentenced to death under the laws of the Dakota Territory, only to be freed by a landmark decision of the U.S. Supreme Court.
1881	Sep 8	Passengers aboard a train destined for Bisbee, Arizona are robbed of their valuables. Frank Stilwell and Pete Spence are later charged with the crime.
1881	Oct 26	The Gunfight at the O.K. Corral takes place in the street behind a saloon in Tombstone, Arizona, pitting the Earp brothers and Doc Holliday against Ike and Billy Clanton, Frank and Tom McLaury, and Billy Claiborne. Billy Clanton and the McLaurys are killed, and Virgil and Morgan Earp, along with Holliday, are wounded.
1881	Dec 6	Butler, Missouri becomes the first city west of the Mississippi River to illuminate its streets with public electric lighting.
1881	Dec 13	San Jose, California becomes the first city west of the Rocky Mountains with civic electric lighting when a 237-foot-tall moonlight tower is illuminated downtown.
1882	Mar 18	Morgan Earp is shot through a window and killed while playing billiards in a Tombstone saloon. His assassination is linked to his involvement in the Gunfight at the O.K. Corral.
1882	Mar 20	In retaliation for the attacks on his brothers Virgil and Morgan, Wyatt Earp shoots and kills Frank Stilwell in a railyard in Tucson, beginning the Earp Vendetta Ride.
1882	Mar 24	Outlaw William "Curly Bill" Brocius is shot and killed by Wyatt Earp at Iron Springs in southeastern Arizona.
1882	Apr 3	Jesse James is shot in the back of the head by Robert Ford, a new recruit to his gang, at his home in St. Joseph, Missouri.
1882	Apr 16	John Allen mortally wounds Frank Loving during a shootout in Trinidad, Colorado.
1882	May 6	President Chester A. Arthur signs the Chinese Exclusion Act, which effects a near-complete ban on Chinese immigration and naturalization in the United States. The law is especially significant for the burgeoning railroad and mining industries in the West, which had previously relied largely on low-wage Chinese labor. Though the original act is set to expire in ten years, it is renewed in 1892 and again in 1902.
1882	Jun 20	A band of Teton Lakota travels east from Fort Yates to begin a three-day hunt of a large herd of bison on reservation lands near what is now Hettinger, North Dakota, in what is later called the "Last Great Buffalo Hunt".
1882	Jul 17	U.S. cavalry under Adna R. Chaffee and Andrew W. Evans pursue and defeat warriors of the White Mountain Apache tribe at the Battle of Big Dry Wash in the Arizona Territory.
1882	Nov 14	"Buckskin" Frank Leslie shoots and kills outlaw Billy Claiborne while bartending at the Oriental Saloon in Tombstone, Arizona.
1883	Jan 12	The Southern section of the second transcontinental railroad line is completed.
1883	Jan 20	A runaway train derails near Tehachapi, California, killing 15 people and injuring former Governor John G. Downey. Investigations suspect a botched train robbery as the cause of the accident.
1883	Sep 8	The Northern Pacific Railroad is completed near Independence Creek in western Montana Territory, connecting St. Paul, Minnesota with the Washington Territory.
1883	Dec 8	In the Bisbee massacre, five outlaws rob a general store in Bisbee, Arizona and kill four people in the process.
1884	Mar 11	Former lawmen Ben Thompson and John King Fisher are ambushed and killed by enemies of Thompson at the Jack Harris Vaudeville Saloon and Theater in San Antonio, Texas.
1884	Apr 10	Lawman William "Bill" Tilghman is appointed city marshal of Dodge City, Kansas.
1884	May 17	The Department of Alaska is organized into the District of Alaska.
1884	Dec 1	A 36-hour standoff begins in the town of Reserve, New Mexico when a posse of Texan cowboys confronts lawman Elfego Baca for having arrested an intoxicated cowboy.
1885	Jun 18	James Arcene, a 23-year-old Cherokee man, is hanged in Fort Smith, Arkansas for a robbery and murder which occurred in 1872, when he was 10 years old. His age at the time of the crime makes him the youngest person ever to be sentenced to death and subsequently executed in U.S. history.
1885	Sep 2	Years of racial tension, aggravated by labor unrest over the preferential hiring of Chinese immigrants for very low wages, come to a head in the Rock Springs massacre, which leaves at least 28 Chinese coal miners dead at the hands of white miners in the town of Rock Springs, Wyoming. The riot touches off a wave of anti-Chinese violence across the country.
1886		Jack Langrishe, a popular western entertainer, is elected justice in Coeur d'Alene, Idaho.
1886	Feb 18	Dave Rudabaugh, a former member of Billy the Kid's Dodge City Gang, is reportedly captured and decapitated by townspeople after terrorizing the village of Parral, Mexico.
1886	Mar 21	The "Big Fight" takes place in Tascosa, Texas, when three ex-members of Pat Garrett's "Home Rangers" are killed by rival ranch hands and gunmen.
1886	Aug 7	Fort Fred Steele, used to protect railroads from local Native American tribes in the Wyoming Territory, is closed.
1886	Aug 20	Fort Duchesne is officially opened by Major Frederick William Benteen in the Utah Territory.
1886	Sep 4	Apache renegade Geronimo surrenders to forces under General Nelson Miles and is taken into custody at Fort Grant, Arizona. His surrender is often considered the end of the Apache Wars.
1886	Winter	The extremely harsh winter of 1886–87 devastates the American cattle industry, leading to the end of the open range era. As a result, cattle ranching is completely reorganized and the period of the great cattle drives is over.
1886	Dec 1	Brothers Jim and Rube Burrow rob their first train in Bellevue, Texas.
1887	Feb 8	The Dawes Act is signed into law by President Grover Cleveland, permitting the federal government to divide communal Native American lands into privately owned allotments and to grant United States citizenship to individual allottees. Intended as a way to modernize the reservation system and assimilate Native Americans into mainstream society, the act forces the sale and redistribution of nearly 90 million acres of Indian lands in the West to white settlers and commercial interests over the next five decades.
1887	Feb 8	Luke Short kills former Fort Worth, Texas Marshal Jim Courtright in a gunfight on the streets of Fort Worth. The shooting is ruled self-defense, since Courtright drew his pistol first.
1887	Apr 4	Susanna M. Salter becomes mayor of Argonia, Kansas, the first woman to be elected to mayoral office anywhere in the United States.
1888	Jan 12–13	A severe winter storm known as the Schoolhouse Blizzard kills more than 235 people across a vast area of the Great Plains including the Dakota Territory, Nebraska, and Kansas.
1888	Dec 18	Richard Wetherill and his brother-in-law discover the Cliff Palace of Mesa Verde in southwestern Colorado.
1889	Jan 12	During the Gray County War, a shootout erupts in Cimarron, Kansas when a party led by Bill Tilghman raids the Old Gray County Courthouse in an attempt to bring the county records to the neighboring town of Ingalls.
1889	Feb 3	Belle Starr is murdered in Oklahoma.
1889	Apr 22	An estimated 50,000 homesteaders rush to claim nearly two million acres of unoccupied land appropriated for public settlement from ceded Native American territory in what is now central Oklahoma. It is the first of several major land runs in the region.
1889	May 11	U.S. Army paymaster Joseph W. Wham and his escort of eleven Buffalo Soldiers are ambushed and robbed of more than $28,000 in gold and silver coins by a posse of bandits on the road to Fort Thomas, Arizona Territory. The bandits are never captured.
1889	Jun 6	Great Seattle Fire: A fire destroys the entire central business district in Seattle, Washington Territory, eventually burning 25 city blocks and costing the city nearly $20 million.
1889	Jun 24	Outlaw Butch Cassidy robs his first bank in Telluride, Colorado before fleeing to the remote hideout of Robbers Roost.
1889	Aug 25	Sylvestro "Pedro" Morales murders San Juan Capistrano rancher Henry Charles.
1889	Nov 2	North Dakota and South Dakota are admitted as the 39th and 40th U.S. states.
1889	Nov 2	Eight imprisoned Apache renegades, including the Apache Kid, murder two sheriffs and escape into the desert during a prisoner transfer near Globe, Arizona.
1889	Nov 8	Montana is admitted as the 41st U.S. state.
1889	Nov 11	Washington is admitted as the 42nd U.S. state.

== 1890s ==
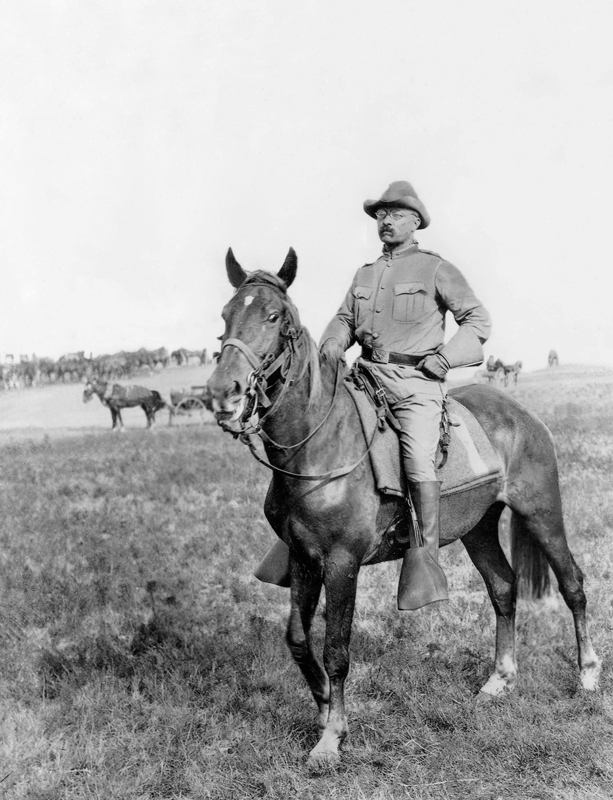
Theodore Roosevelt

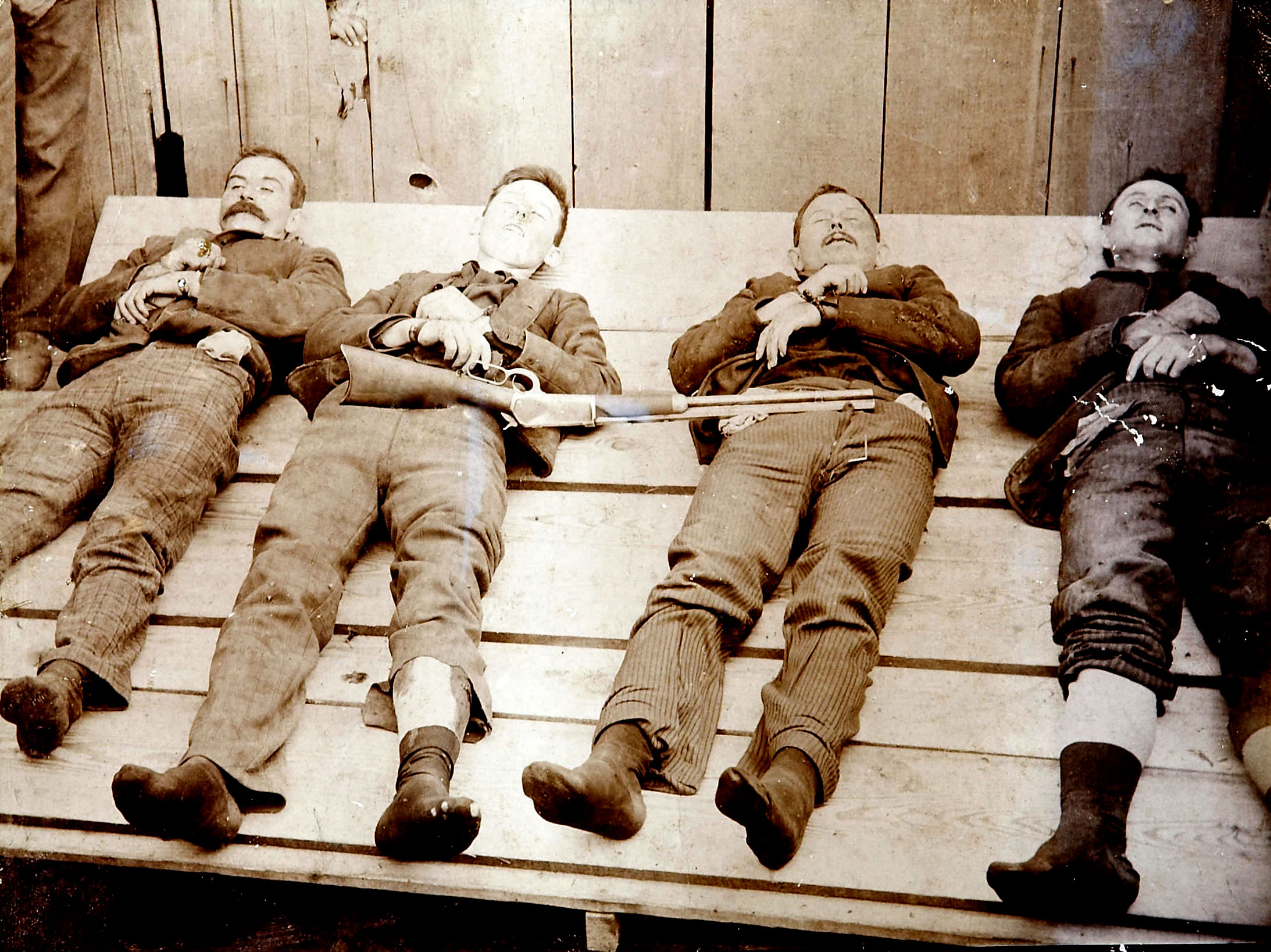
Members of the Dalton Gang after attempted bank robberies in Coffeyville, Kansas

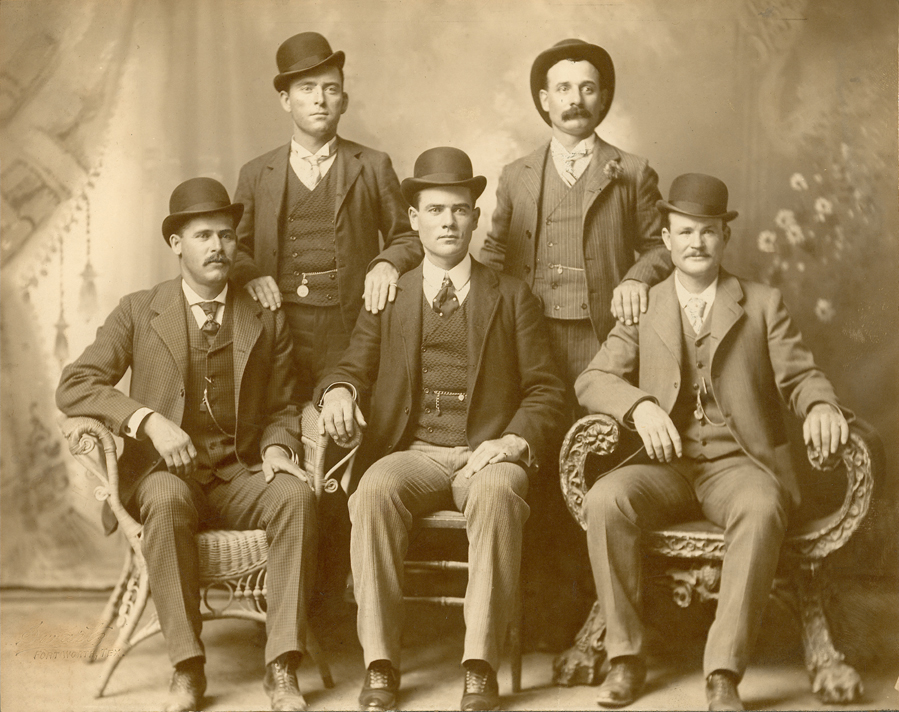
Butch Cassidy's Wild Bunch

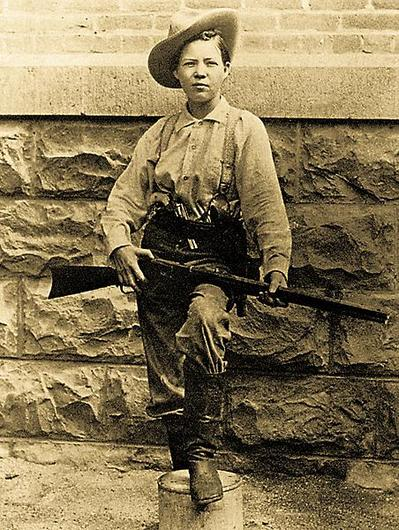
Pearl Hart

Year	Date	Event
1890	Jun	Data collected for the Eleventh United States Census indicate that the spread of the population into unsettled areas has resulted in the disappearance of the American frontier. The U.S. Census Bureau declares that it will no longer monitor westward migration in the country.
1890	Jul 3	Idaho is admitted as the 43rd U.S. state.
1890	Jul 10	Wyoming is admitted as the 44th U.S. state.
1890	Oct 1	Yosemite and Sequoia are established as the second and third U.S. National Parks.
1890	Dec	Black Eagle Dam, in Great Falls, Montana, begins generating electricity for the first time. It is the first hydroelectric dam to be built on the Missouri River and the first in the state of Montana.
1890	Dec 29	More than 200 men, women, and children of the Lakota Sioux are killed at Wounded Knee Creek on the Pine Ridge Indian Reservation in South Dakota when the U.S. 7th Cavalry Regiment under Colonel James W. Forsyth attempts to confiscate their weapons.
1891	Mar 3	The Forest Reserve Act is signed into law by President Benjamin Harrison, repealing previous policies such as the Timber Culture Act of 1873 and authorizing the creation of the nation's first "forest reserves" in an effort to protect timber and mineral resources from overexploitation. The law serves as a catalyst to a series of federal land reform legislation over the next three decades which greatly expand government-administered public lands and restrict private development. It also heralds changing attitudes toward land management in the West, with federal priorities gradually shifting from selling public land to conserving public resources, and federal regulations becoming a permanent fixture on the once unregulated frontier.
1891	May 11	The U.S. Army establishes Fort Yellowstone near Mammoth Hot Springs in order to manage Yellowstone National Park.
1892	Apr 8–13	In the most violent episode of the Johnson County War, wealthy cattle barons of the Wyoming Stock Growers Association and hired mercenaries invade the Powder River Country to persecute local ranchers on allegations of cattle rustling. A series of deadly stand-offs ensues before President Benjamin Harrison orders the 6th Cavalry Regiment to intervene. The conflict forces a reorganization of the cattle industry in Wyoming and becomes one of the most well-known range wars in the history of the West.
1892	Apr 20	Edward L. Doheny and Charles A. Canfield drill into a massive oilfield beneath present-day downtown Los Angeles, precipitating the Southern California oil boom.
1892	Jun 1	The Dalton Gang robs a train near Red Rock, Oklahoma Territory.
1892	Aug 2	Tom Graham, the last male member of the Graham family, is killed by Edwin Tewksbury in Tempe, Arizona, concluding the Pleasant Valley War.
1892	Oct 5	Four members of the Dalton Gang are killed in a shootout with townspeople while trying to rob two banks at the same time in Coffeyville, Kansas.
1892	Nov 1	The newly formed Doolin-Dalton Gang robs a bank in Spearville, Kansas.
1893	Jan 6	The last spike is driven in the Great Northern Railway near Scenic, Washington, completing a transcontinental route between Seattle and Saint Paul, Minnesota.
1893	May 15	Provoked by the previous year's strike in Coeur d'Alene, coal miners establish the Western Federation of Miners in Butte, Montana.
1893	Jun 11–12	Following a ten-month manhunt, local train robbers John Sontag and Chris Evans are wounded during a shootout with a posse of lawmen on a ranch north of Visalia, California. Both outlaws are eventually captured, and Sontag dies of his wounds three weeks later.
1893	Jun 30	Captain Frank Jones is killed when he and a party of Texas Rangers searching for a gang of Mexican cattle rustlers are ambushed near the border town of Tres Jacales.
1893	Sep 1	Three deputy U.S. Marshals and two civilians are killed in a shootout with members of the Doolin–Dalton Gang in the town of Ingalls, Oklahoma Territory. All of the outlaws manage to escape.
1893	Nov 7	Women in Colorado are granted the right to vote.
1894	Feb 7	When mine owners in Cripple Creek, Colorado extend the standard workday from eight hours to ten hours without a corresponding raise in wages, newly unionized miners of the Western Federation of Miners go on strike, setting off a labor dispute that immediately stymies mining operations throughout the region.
1894	May 10	The Doolin-Dalton Gang robs a bank in Southwest City, Missouri.
1894	Aug 18	The Carey Act is enacted by Congress, providing a new system for the development of federal lands in the semi-arid West by allowing individual states to hire private contractors to erect large-scale irrigation systems on land allotted for the purpose and then profit from the sale of water to tenants. The system is most successfully utilized in Idaho and Wyoming.
1894	Nov 1	The Southern Pacific passenger train Sunset Limited begins regular service on the second transcontinental railroad route.
1895	Apr 3	The Wild Bunch robs a train near Dover, Oklahoma Territory. U.S. Marshals under Chris Madsen surprise the robbers in a shootout the following morning, killing William "Tulsa Jack" Blake and scattering the rest of the gang.
1895	May 2	Wild Bunch outlaws George "Bittercreek" Newcomb and Charley Pierce are killed in a shootout with bounty hunters.
1895	Aug 19	Outlaw John Wesley Hardin is shot and killed by John Selman at the Acme Saloon in El Paso, Texas.
1895	Dec 18	A gang of bandits led by Augustine Chacon robs a general store in Morenci, Arizona Territory. In a shootout the following day, several people are killed and Chacon is captured.
1896	Jan 4	Utah is admitted as the 45th U.S. state.
1896	Jan 15	Bill Tilghman single-handedly captures wanted gang leader Bill Doolin at a bathhouse in Eureka Springs, Arkansas and returns him to the Oklahoma Territory. Doolin escapes from prison on July 5.
1896	Aug 12	An uprising of Yaqui Indians and Mexican revolutionaries, angered by the policies of Mexican President Porfirio Díaz, storms the customhouse in Nogales, Sonora on the U.S.–Mexico border. Detachments of both federal armies manage to disperse the rebels over the next several days.
1896	Aug 13	Butch Cassidy, Elzy Lay, Harvey "Kid Curry" Logan, and Bob Meeks rob a bank in Montpelier, Idaho.
1896	Sep 15	A staged train wreck designed as a publicity stunt for the Missouri-Kansas-Texas Railroad unexpectedly causes simultaneous boiler explosions that kill at least two spectators and result in numerous other injuries.
1897	Apr 15	Crude oil is discovered for the first time in the Indian Territory, near present-day Bartlesville, Oklahoma.
1898	Jun 28	The Curtis Act is signed into law by President William McKinley, allowing the dissolution of tribal governments and the break-up of communal lands belonging to the Five Civilized Tribes of the Indian Territory, which had previously been exempt from the Dawes Act of 1887 because of the terms of their treaties. The law immediately transfers control of about 90 million acres of tribal land to the U.S. government, and more is transferred in subsequent years.
1898	Jul 8	The Shootout on Juneau Wharf occurs in Skagway, District of Alaska when crime boss Soapy Smith and Frank H. Reid are shot during an argument. Smith is killed immediately and Reid dies 12 days later.
1898	Aug–Oct	At least 500 members of 35 different American Indian tribes attend the Indian Congress in Omaha, Nebraska, the largest gathering of its kind to date.
1899	May 30	Pearl Hart and a companion rob a stagecoach traveling between Globe and Florence in the Arizona Territory. The pair is tracked down and arrested a few days later.
1899	Jun 2	Butch Cassidy and his Wild Bunch rob an Overland Flyer passenger train near Wilcox, Wyoming, resulting in a massive but ultimately futile manhunt.

== 1900s ==
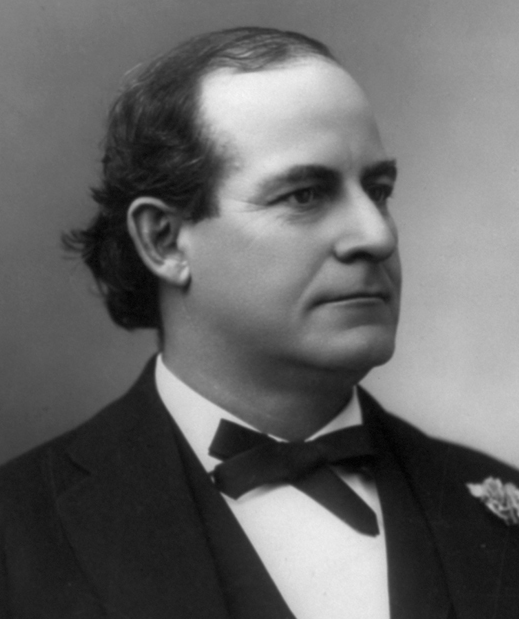
William Jennings Bryan

Year	Date	Event
1900	Feb 15	Lawman Jeff Milton thwarts an attempted train robbery at the rail depot in Fairbank, Arizona, killing outlaw "Three-Fingered Jack" Dunlop.
1900	May 1	A dust explosion at the Winter Quarters Mine near Scofield, Utah kills at least 200 coal miners in the Scofield Mine disaster, the deadliest mining accident in American history to date.
1900	May 19	Jim Butler discovers silver near what will soon become the town of Tonopah, Nevada.
1900	Sep 19	The First National Bank of Winnemucca, Nevada is robbed by three men of more than $30,000 in gold coins. The robbers are never captured or identified.
1901	Jan 10	An oil well on the Spindletop dome near Beaumont, Texas strikes crude oil, becoming the first major gusher in the state and triggering the Texas oil boom.
1901	Feb 20	Butch Cassidy, Harry Longabaugh, and Etta Place depart the United States for Buenos Aires, Argentina aboard a British steamer.
1902	Jun 17	The Newlands Reclamation Act is signed into law by President Theodore Roosevelt, appropriating money from the sale of arid lands in 16 Western states to fund projects to irrigate those lands.
1902	Nov 21	Mexican bandit Augustine Chacon is hanged in Solomonville, Arizona Territory.
1903	May 23	Horatio Nelson Jackson and Sewall K. Crocker depart San Francisco in a two-cylinder Winton motor car. They arrive in New York City on July 26, becoming the first people to cross the continent in an automobile.
1903	Nov 20	Legendary gunman Tom Horn is hanged in Cheyenne, Wyoming for the disputed killing of 14-year-old sheepherder Willie Nickell in 1901. His trial and hanging mark the waning of the power of the cattle barons in Wyoming.
1905	May 15	The city of Las Vegas is founded in Nevada.
1905	Dec 30	Former Idaho Governor Frank Steunenberg is wounded by a bomb in his home in Caldwell, Idaho and dies a short time later. An investigation suggests the assassination was motivated by prior labor unrest in Idaho's mining communities.
1906	Apr 18	An earthquake and resulting fires devastate the city of San Francisco and neighboring communities, killing at least 3,000 people and leaving nearly three-fourths of the Bay Area's population homeless.
1907	Nov 16	Oklahoma is admitted as the 46th U.S. state.
1908	Feb 29	Pat Garrett is murdered under mysterious circumstances near Las Cruces, New Mexico Territory.
1908	Nov 7	Butch Cassidy and the Sundance Kid are reportedly found dead following a shootout with police in the town of San Vicente, Bolivia.
1909	Mar	In the so-called Crazy Snake Rebellion, the theft of a piece of smoked meat prompts white posses to evict African-American refugees from lands of the Muscogee Creek Nation in the new state of Oklahoma. When they attempt to arrest chief Chitto Harjo, an outspoken opponent of the allotment and sale of Creek tribal lands, two lawmen are killed and Harjo escapes.

== 1910s ==
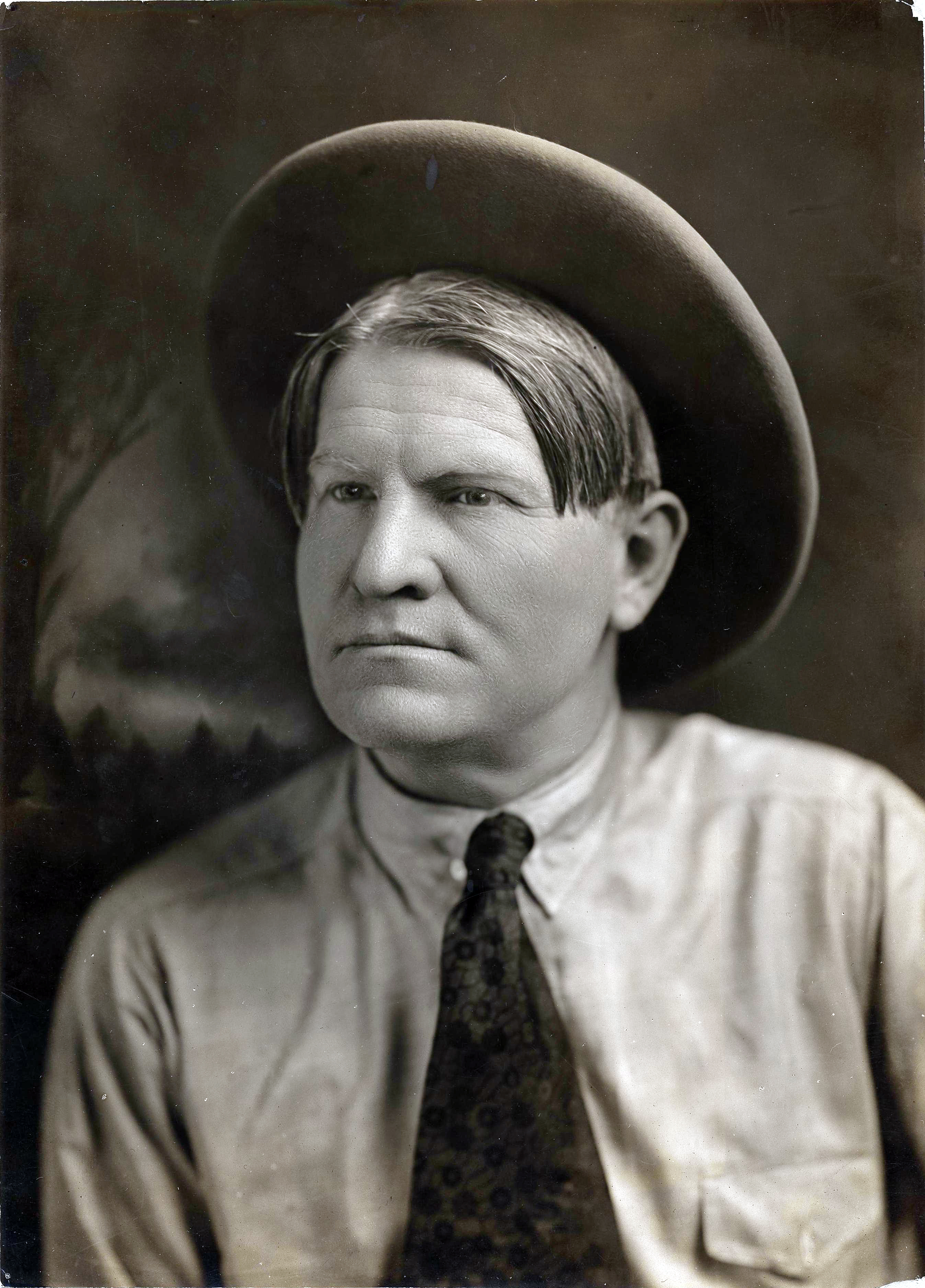
Charles Marion Russell

Year	Date	Event
1911	Aug 28	Ishi, called "the last wild Indian", surrenders near Oroville, California.
1912	Jan 6	New Mexico is admitted as the 47th U.S. state.
1912	Feb 14	Arizona is admitted as the 48th U.S. state. It is the last state to be admitted to the Union during the Old West era.
1912	Mar 13	Baxter's Curve Train Robbery: Long-time outlaw Ben Kilpatrick and accomplice Ole Hobek are killed by a hostage while attempting to rob a Southern Pacific express car near Sanderson, Texas.
1912	Aug 24	The District of Alaska is organized into the Territory of Alaska.
1914	Apr 20	Colorado Coalfield War: Local militia and hired guns of the Colorado Fuel and Iron Company attack a tent colony of striking coal miners and their families near Trinidad, killing 21 people in the Ludlow Massacre. The incident provokes looting, vandalism, and skirmishes throughout the Front Range until President Woodrow Wilson deploys federal soldiers to restore order.
1916	Dec 5	The last stagecoach robbery in American history occurs at Jarbidge Canyon, Nevada, when three robbers hold up a U.S. Post Office Department stagecoach, shoot the driver, and steal $4,000 in cash. The criminals are captured without incident soon after.

== Later events ==
Year	Date	Event
1959	Jan 6	Alaska is admitted as the 49th U.S. state, marking the complete political incorporation of continental U.S. western territorial acquisitions.

== See also ==
- Historic regions of the United States
- Territorial evolution of the United States
- List of Old West gunfights
- Western United States
  - Mountain States
  - Northwestern United States
  - Southwestern United States
  - Pacific States
  - Great Plains
  - Rocky Mountains
  - Great Basin
  - Sierra Nevada
  - Cascade Range
