= Long's Expedition of 1820 =

Exploration of Western North America

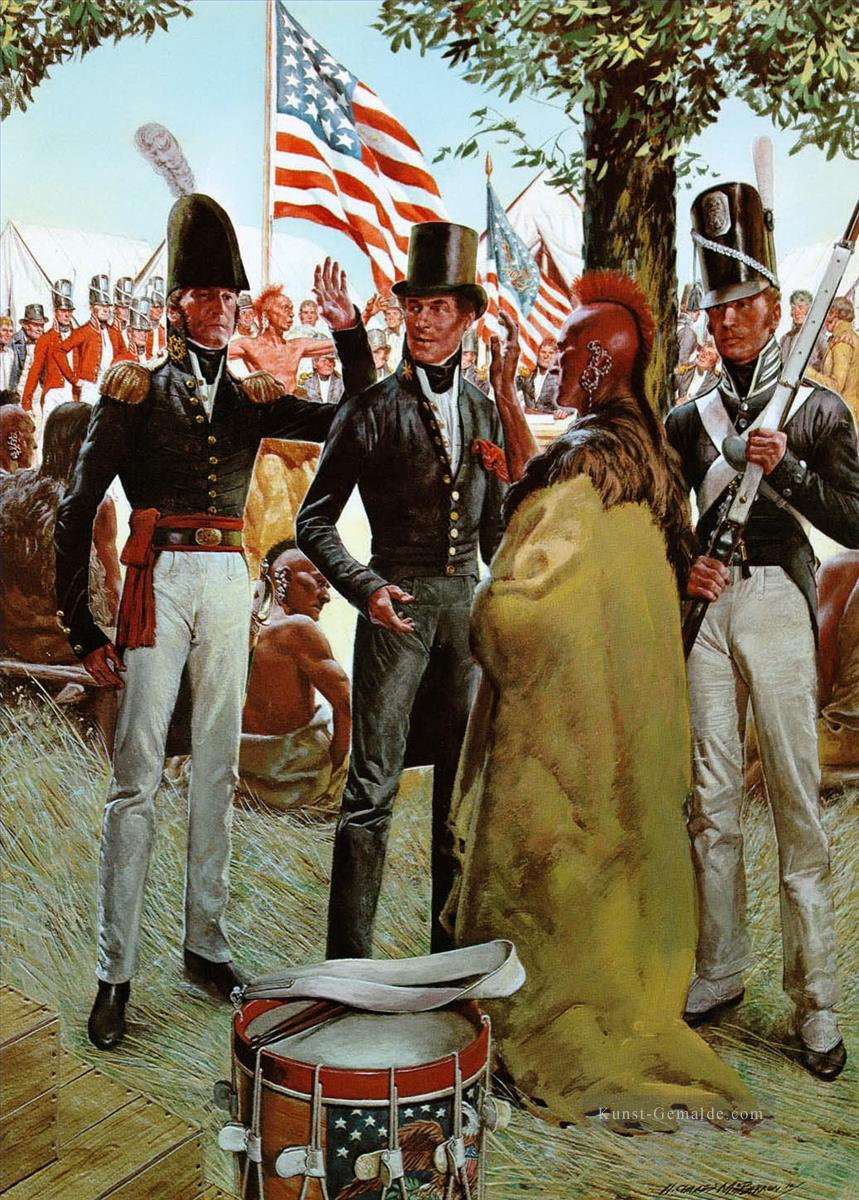
Major Stephen H. Long meets with the Pawnees at Council Bluff, Nebraska, 1819.

The Stephen H. Long Expedition of 1820 traversed America's Great Plains and up to the foothills of the Rocky Mountains. It was the first scientific party hired by the United States government to explore the West. Lewis and Clark (1803–1806) and Zebulon Pike (1805–1807) explored the western frontier but they were primarily military expeditions. A group of scientists traveled to St. Louis (present Missouri) and on to Council Bluff (Nebraska) for the Yellowstone expedition of the upper Missouri River that would have established a number of military posts. The expensive effort was cancelled following a financial crash, steamboat failures, operational scandals, and negotiation of the Adams–Onís Treaty of 1819, which changed the border between New Spain and the United States. The scientists were reassigned to an expedition led by Stephen Harriman Long. From June 6 to September 13, 1820, Long and fellow scientists traveled across the Great Plains beginning at the Missouri River near present Omaha, Nebraska, along the Platte River to the Front Range, and east along the Arkansas and Canadian Rivers of Colorado and Oklahoma. The expedition terminated at Fort Smith in Arkansas. They recorded many new species of plants, insects, and animals. Long called the land the Great American Desert.

== Background and preparation ==
By 1818, British traders operated in the northern Great Plains. The Yellowstone expedition, authorized by Secretary of War John C. Calhoun, was a "grandiose" plan to build a number of military outposts along the upper Missouri River. Colonel Henry Atkinson commanded more than 1100 soldiers of the Sixth Infantry Regiment and the Rifle Regiment to carry out the orders to establish the military posts.

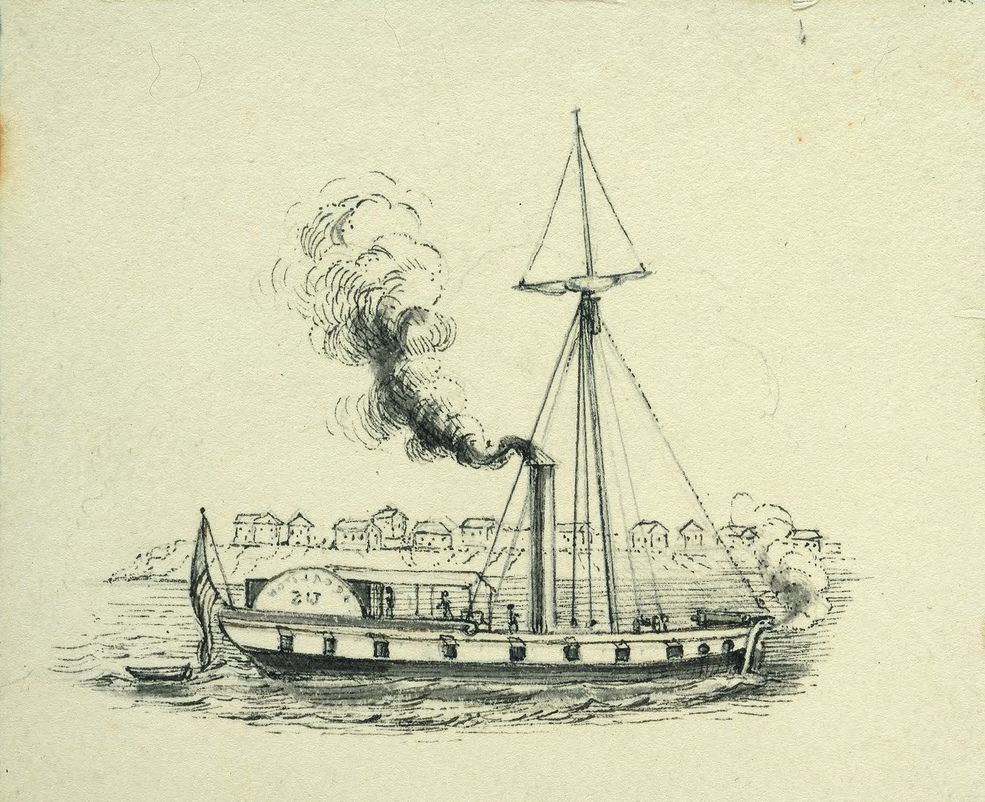
Western Engineer steamboat, designed by Stephen Harriman Long for the expedition up the shallow upper Missouri River.

The military and scientific expedition planned to travel up the river by steamboat and collect scientific information of the northwest. In the spring of 1819, Long and his scientists began their journey from Pittsburgh, Pennsylvania on the Western Engineer that Long designed for the expedition. They traveled along the Ohio River and Mississippi River, and arrived at St. Louis on June 9, 1819. From there, they made their way along the Mississippi and Missouri Rivers, headed for the Council Bluff area of present Nebraska. Dr. William Baldwin, assigned the roles of botanist and surgeon, became quite ill with tuberculosis. He left the expedition at Franklin, Missouri on July 18, and died on August 31, 1819. Continuing on the Missouri River, the scientists occasionally left the boat to find and document flora and fauna. They reached Council Bluff on September 19, the first steam boat to travel that far up the Missouri River. They set up the Engineer Cantonment, staying there throughout the winter. The Sixth Infantry Regiment camped nearby at the Cantonment Missouri.

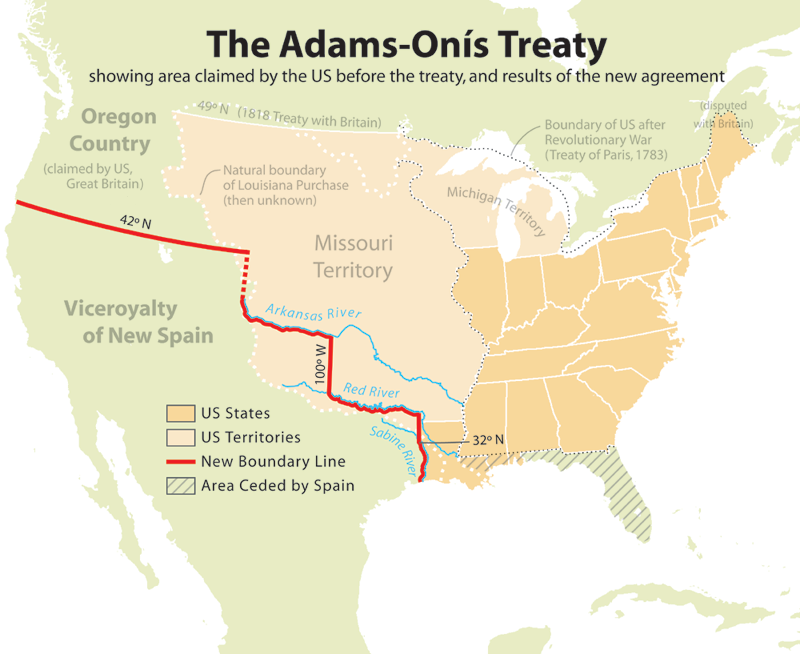
Map showing the results of the Adams–Onís Treaty of 1819

The funding for the Yellowstone expedition was withdrawn for a number of reasons. There had been operational scandals and steamboat failures of the expedition. There were also Congressional budget cuts due to the financial crash following the Panic of 1819. Another key factor was that the United States and Spain had just completed the Adams–Onís Treaty that made a new United States border to the Pacific Ocean. President James Madison decided that it was now more important to understand the route along the Platte River to the Rocky Mountains and south to the Spanish colonies bordered by the Arkansas and Red Rivers.

While Congress no longer funded the Yellowstone expedition, it did provide funding for a scaled-down scientific exploration of the Great Plains by Major Stephen Harriman Long. The scientists that were assigned to the Yellowstone expedition were reassigned to the Long expedition of the Great Plains.

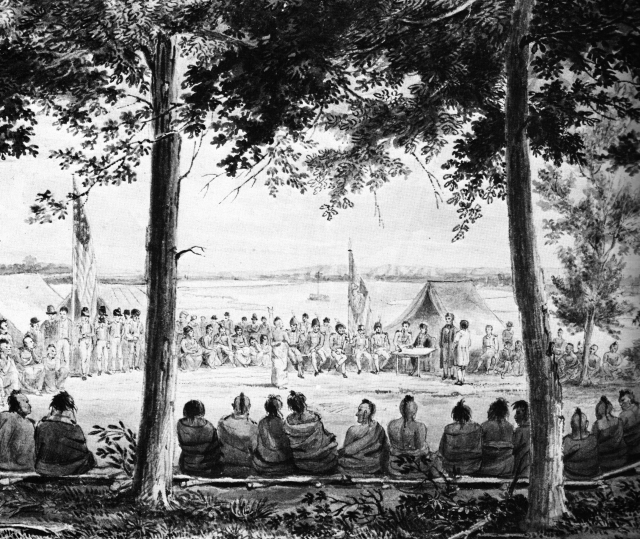
Pawnees in a parley with Major Long's expedition at Engineer Cantonment, near Council Bluff, in October 1819. From an original watercolor by Samuel Seymour (1775–1823).

Rather than a string of military posts, the Congressional budget only allowed for one outpost, Fort Atkinson, which was established at the site of Atkinson's winter quarters along the Missouri River. The lean budget meant that the party did not have the men, horses, food, and equipment required for a journey of this scope and length of time. They were warned by white and Native American people against the trip because they would be passing through dry, barren lands, with inadequate supplies, and subject to hostilities with Indigenous nations.

== Expedition ==
=== Objective ===
The expedition, which occurred from June through September 1820, began along the Missouri River in Nebraska, traversed through the Plains to the Front Range of present-day Colorado, southeast along the Arkansas River and Canadian Rivers, and through what is now Oklahoma. The expedition's objective was to travel along the Platte River to its source, and then travel east along the Arkansas and Red Rivers to the Mississippi. The scientists were tasked to document the natural resources and the Native Americans, and to map the area that they traversed through the Great Plains. Long said that he wanted all vegetation, land and water life, and geological formations to be studied and documented, along with diseases of animals and insects. "Manners and customs" of Native Americans were to be documented. Illustrations were to capture landscapes "distinguished for their beauty and grandeur".

=== Expedition team ===
Major Stephen Harriman Long, a topographical engineer and scientist with the United States Army, led the party through the first military and scientific reconnaissance of the Great Plains. Long's scientists had expertise in botany, ethnology, geology, and zoology. Prior to the invention of the permanent photograph, an artist illustrated the landscape.

Long was the group's topographical engineer and cartographer. Lieutenant W. H. Swift was the commanding guard and assistant topographer. Captain John R. Bell was the journalist. Dr. Edwin James was the expedition's physician, botanist and geologist. Titian Peale and Thomas Say were the zoologists. Peale was also an artist. Samuel Seymour was the illustrator.

Corporal Parish and six privates of the Sixth Infantry Regiment, as well as guides and hunters, accompanied Long's expedition. Joseph Bijeau was a Crow language and Native American sign language interpreter. Abram Deloux was a guide and hunter. Stephen Julien was a French and Native American interpreter. D. Adams was a Spanish interpreter. Z. Wilson was the Baggage Master. Duncan and Oakley were engagees. There were eight pack horses and mules, in addition to the horses for each man. The pack animals carried food, camping equipment, rifles, tools necessary for scientific and topographical study, and specimen containers.

=== Nebraska ===
Leaving the Engineer Cantonment along the Missouri River, the group began their southwestward journey on June 6, 1820. They rose at 5:00 a.m. each morning and covered 20 to 30 miles each day. Riding horseback, Captain Bell led the group of 21 men at a moderate pace. He was followed by the guide, soldiers, and attendants with pack horses. The scientists fell in as they saw fit. Long brought up the rear, managing issues as they arose, ensuring the group stayed together, and ensuring that the cargo remained secure on the pack horses. They made Elkhorn River, a tributary of the Platte River, on June 9 where they met up with French traders bound for an Omaha village to trade goods for fur pelts. One of the men had been recently shot during a Native American attack on the Pratte and Vasquez party. In the early days of their expedition, they passed Pawnee villages and traveled through mostly treeless prairie and were subject to thunderstorms. Near the Loup River, they met two Pawnee riding horseback who were bound for a celebration with the Omaha people. They recorded sighting of Bartram's sandpiper, marbled godwits, and other birds and a number of plants, including rabbits foot plaintain and sweet peas. After crossing Beaver Creek, they met up with three Frenchmen and two Native Americans who were carrying vaccine supplied by the Department of War for the Pawnee. The men had not eaten since they left Missouri and were given some food before they resumed their journey. The expedition camped one night at a Grand Pawnee village.

Since their journey began, they traveled for two weeks on the north side of the Platte River, and across to the South Platte River near present North Platte, Nebraska, where they saw an immense herd of at least 10,000 bison. James collected prairie plants, some recorded for the first time. Peale and Say recorded pronghorns, wapiti (elk), black-tailed jackrabbit, badgers, prairie wolves (coyote), white-tailed deer, and prairie dogs. They also found great horned owls and golden eagles. Traveling southwest, the climate and terrain was more desert-like, with shallow rivers, and bright sunlight that bounced off the sand and hurt their eyes. They passed sites of former Native American villages, but did not see any more Native Americans for more than a month and a half.

=== Colorado ===
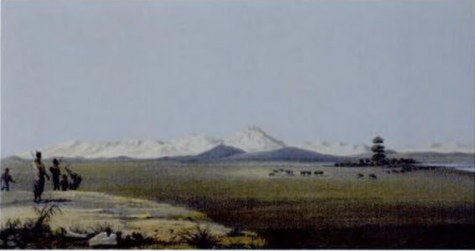
Samuel Seymour, Distant view of the Rocky Mountains, Long Expedition, 1820

On June 30, the expeditionary force saw a thin blue line on the horizon. They had their first view of the Rocky Mountains near what is now Bijou Creek in Fort Morgan. Long named the creek Bijeaus Creek for his guide. Seymour and Peale sketched the mountain range. One peak, higher than the others, was later named Longs Peak for their leader. Following South Platte into Waterton Canyon (Platte Canyon, southwest of present Denver, Colorado), the men camped for several days to study and record their findings in the foothills of the Rocky Mountains. James noted the presence of scrubby oaks, specifically the undescribed Gambel's oak, Say found the first species of solpugids in North America, and a rock wren was collected. A few men decided to follow the South Platte further up the mountains, but they became ill, likely due to altitude sickness. The expedition next headed south towards the Arkansas River, stopping to enjoy the views of what is now Roxborough State Park. Long took a side journey to the top of Dawson Butte (southwest of Castle Rock, while some of the men traveled along Rampart Range, discovering the dusky grouse and band-tailed pigeon.

The group continued to travel south along the Front Range. Among the new plants that James found was aquilegia coerulea, the columbine that later became the Colorado state flower. It was found in present-day Douglas County near Elephant Rock amongst oak brush land, grassland, and ponderosa pine forest. In addition to other animals that they saw earlier on their trek, they saw kangaroo rats, a white grizzly bear, robins, and many beaver dams. Bell was inspired to describe it as a place where "naturalists find new inhabitants, the botanist is at a loss which new plant he will first take in hand—the geologist grand subjects for speculation—the geographer & topographer all have subjects for observation."

On July 1, the expedition traveled through Garden of the Gods (Colorado Springs, Colorado) and the foothills of Pikes Peak and nearby mountains and camped along Fountain Creek south of Colorado Springs. It was an area full of wildlife, in addition to other animals that they saw previously, they found wild turkeys, burrowing owls, mule deer, and a mockingbird. They lost their supply of fresh water after the creek overflowed during rainstorms, mixing with "historic accumulations of bison dung". Long had been looking for Pikes Peak that Zebulon Pike spotted during his expedition. On July 13, James and some other men from the expedition climbed the 14,000-foot mountain peak. James was the first white person to climb a mountain of that height in North America, ascending through alpine fields and high alpine tundra. (Note: Pikes Peak, rising from 7,000 to 14,000 feet in elevation, has a number of climate and habitat zones including ponderosa pine woodlands, Engelmann spruce-subalpine fir forests, bristlecone pine woodlands, subalpine grasslands, and alpine tundra.) He saw a pika and "numbers of unknown and interesting plants". At the top of the peak, there was little vegetation, but there were clouds of migratory grasshoppers. The temperature on the summit was 42°, compared to 96° at the main camp. As they headed down the mountain, James realized that the fire from his earlier campsite started a forest fire in the spruce-fir forest. James was concerned that the fire might attract Native Americans. After James's return to the expedition party, the group headed southwest to the Arkansas River. The temperature was 100° and the environs were that of semi-arid and barren desert. For 28 miles, they experienced "thirst, heat, and fatigue". Once they found the Arkansas River, some of the party rested. James took a trip up the Arkansas to Royal Gorge (near Cañon City). He found it to be "the grandest & most romantic scenery I ever beheld".

They traveled southeast along the Arkansas River on July 19. Near La Junta the party divided into two groups on July 24. Bell led a group with zoologist Thomas Say along the Arkansas River. Three soldiers took Say's trip journal, observations of Native Americans and animals, and Swift's topographical journal and then deserted the expedition.

=== Oklahoma to Fort Smith, Arkansas ===
Long led ten men, including botanist Edwin James, south and east into the areas of the future states of Oklahoma and Texas. They traveled along the Canadian River, mistaking it for the Red River. They met up with a band of Kiowa Apaches on August 11 and camped with them. It may have been the first recorded contact on the Llano Estacado of White Americans and Kiowa Apaches. They did not meet up with any other Native Americans on the rest of the trip.

Having run out of food, the men hunted for deer and buffalo, but there were not sufficient resources that summer to adequately feed them. Therefore, they ate owl, badger, skunk, and horse meat. The climate was difficult—with high temperatures, no shade, and drought—and they often went without water for 24 hours. The water in streams was often undrinkable due to low water levels and the presence of horse manure and sand. They also suffered from biting insects. The two groups of men met up at Fort Smith (Arkansas) on September 13. During the expedition, the team met up with Arapaho, Cheyenne, Comanche, and Kiowa people in Colorado and Oklahoma.

== Collection ==
Over the course of the expedition, the team collected:

- More than sixty prepared skins of new or rare animals
- Between four and five hundred plants new to the United States
- Several thousand insects, hundreds of which were likely new
- Terrestrial and fluviatile shells
- Collections of fossils and minerals

Peale made 122 sketches of animals and other subjects and Seymour made 150 landscapes.

== Report ==
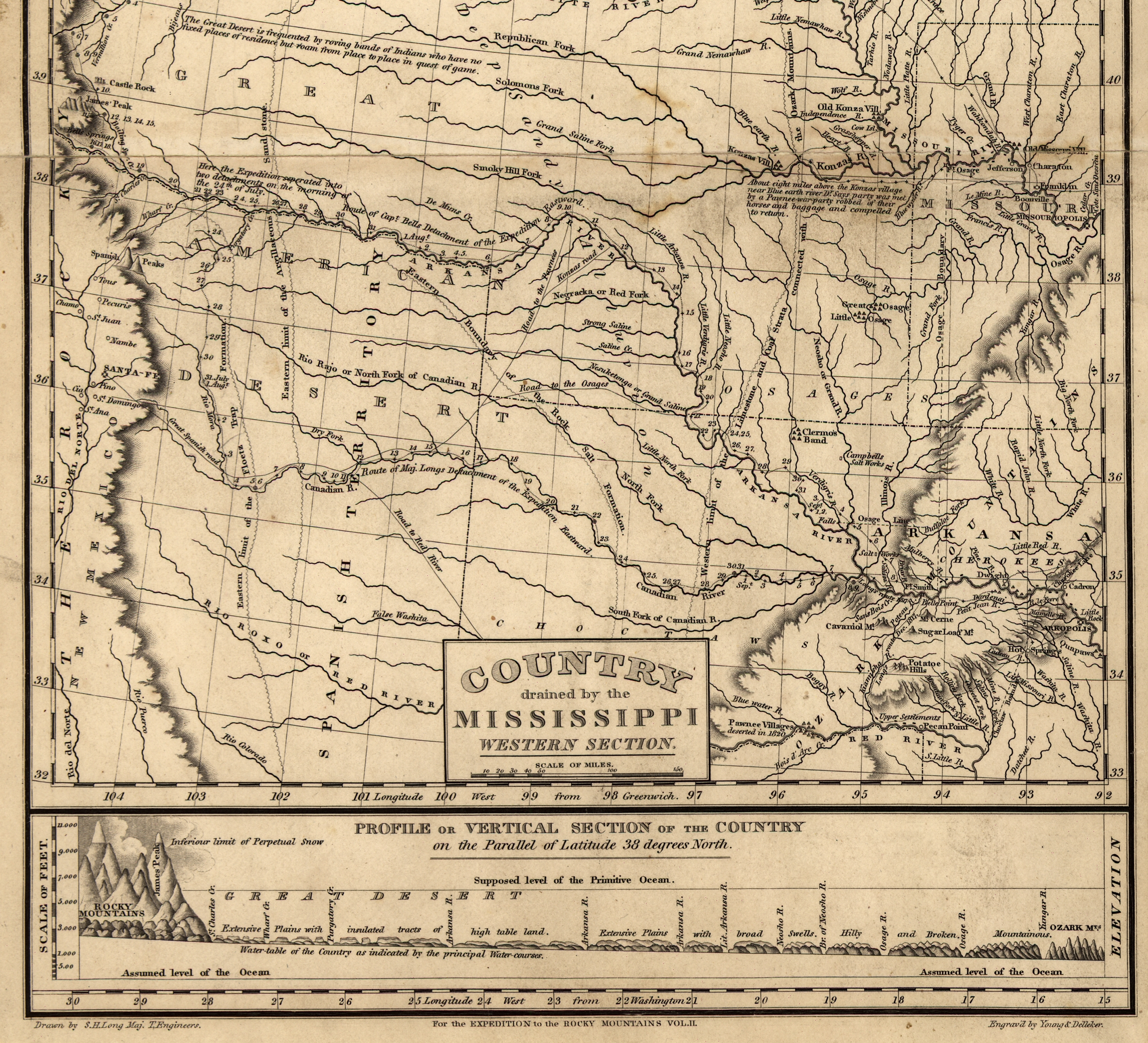
Great American Desert, mapped by Stephen Harriman Long in 1820

Long reported that the plains were a Great American Desert that was not suited for agriculture. By the time that White Americans settled in the Plains, the technology existed for successful deep-well drilling and use of barbed wire. The Long Expedition was carried out during a dry period, which may have influenced the opinion that the land was desert. They would have had better luck finding suitable drinking water if they had traveled up the tributaries that fed into the main rivers.

The scientific and military information about the Western United States from Long's expedition was published in scientific journals and books.

== See also ==
- Timeline of the American Old West
- Clear Creek, Colorado
- Palmer Site, Nebraska
- Trapper's Trail, Colorado - used by the expedition

== Bibliography ==
- Beidleman, Richard G. (1986). "The 1820 Long Expedition". American Zoologist. 26 (2): 307–313. doi:10.1093/icb/26.2.307. ISSN 0003-1569. JSTOR 3883131.
- Benson, Maxine (1988). From Pittsburgh to the Rocky Mountains : Major Stephen Long's expedition, 1819–1820. Golden, Colo. : Fulcrum. ISBN 978-1-55591-022-8.
- Evans, Howard Ensign (1997). The natural history of the Long Expedition to the Rocky Mountains (1819–1820). New York: Oxford University Press. ISBN 978-0-19-511185-9.
- Lammers, Thomas G. (2016). "Edwin James: First Botanist for Iowa (U.S.A.)". Journal of the Botanical Research Institute of Texas. 10 (2): 475–500. ISSN 1934-5259. JSTOR 44858588.
- Mayhall, Mildred P. (1971). The Kiowas. Norman, Oklahoma: University of Oklahoma Press.
