= Western Engineer =

Missouri River paddle steamer

Steamboat Western Engineer
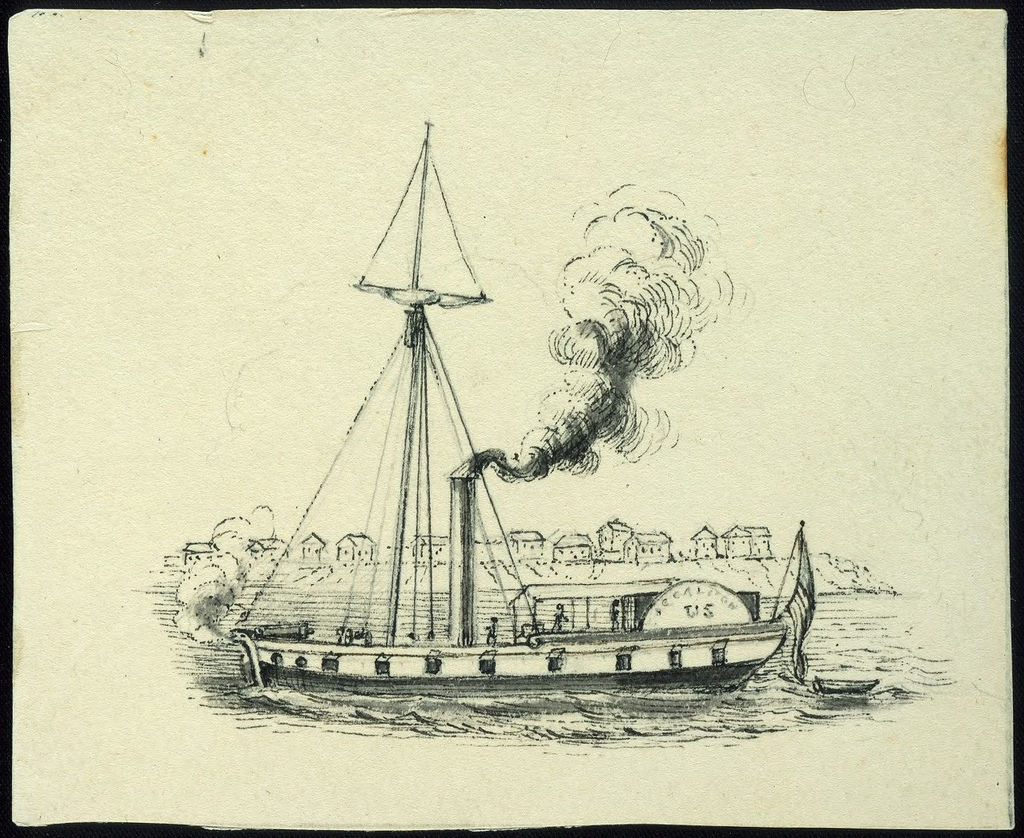
- Steamboat Western Engineer by Titian Ramsay Peale 1819

History

United States
- Owner: United States Army
- Operator: United States Army
- Ordered: 1818
- Builder: Allegheny Arsenal, Pittsburgh, Pennsylvania
- Launched: March 26, 1819
- Completed: April 30, 1819
- Maiden voyage: May 5, 1819
- In service: 1819-1820

General characteristics
- Type: Paddle steamer with auxiliary sail
- Tonnage: 30 t (30,000 kg)
- Length: 75 feet (23 m)
- Beam: 13 feet (4.0 m)
- Draft: 19 inches (48 cm)
- Installed power: Three wood-fired steam boilers
- Propulsion: Steam engine driving a stern paddle wheel
- Crew: Commander, assistant commander, pilot, clerk, carpenter, mechanic and two boys.
- Armament: A cannon in the bow, as well as four howitzers and two smaller artillery pieces.

The paddle steamer Western Engineer was the first steamboat on the Missouri River. It was purpose built after a design by Major Stephen Harriman Long by the Allegheny Arsenal in Pittsburgh, for the scientific party of the Yellowstone expedition which Major Long commanded. The paddle wheel was placed in the stern, the steam engine was hidden below the waterline, the vessel was heavily armed, and it was given a peculiar appearance intended to inspire fear and awe among the Plains Indians. Her first voyage took her from Pittsburgh to Saint Louis in 1819. The second voyage took her to Fort Lisa, Nebraska the same year. The third voyage took her back to Saint Louis in the spring of 1820, while the fourth voyage was a charting expedition up the Mississippi to the Des Moines Rapids and down to Cape Girardeau, Missouri. A fifth voyage intended to take her back to Pittsburgh had to be aborted at Smithland, Kentucky due to low water, and she was left there.

== Background ==
The Yellowstone expedition was a military undertaking ordered by Secretary of War John C. Calhoun. Its primary objective was to establish a military fort at the confluence of the Yellowstone River and the Missouri River, the purpose of which was to prevent the infiltration of Hudson's Bay Company traders into the Great Plains. Its secondary objective was a scientific expedition to explore and map the Missouri and the upper Mississippi watersheds. Hence, the expedition consisted of a military component under Colonel Henry Atkinson of the 6th Infantry and a scientific component under Major Stephen Harriman Long of the Topographical Engineers. Both components would use steamboats and the scientific party would continue up the Missouri when the military party had reached the Yellowstone River.

== Design ==
The Western Engineer was built at the Allegheny Arsenal in Pittsburgh, after Long's design and under his supervision. The paddle wheel was placed in the stern, the steam engine was hidden below the waterline, the vessel was heavily armed, and it was given a peculiar appearance intended to inspire fear and awe among the Plains Indians. At the very front of the bow was a metal pipe that ended in a stylized snake's head from which steam from the steam engine could suddenly be released in a large cloud. The boat was said to look like a scaly monster with a vessel on its back, with gaping gun ports and overflowing with weapons. It had a shallow draft and was very narrow in order to maneuver in the restricted and shallow channels of the upper Missouri River. The draft was only 19 inches (480 mm) at full load, and the vessel was only 13 feet (4.0 m), wide with a displacement of 30 short tons (27 t). Despite its clever design, the Western Engineer did not operate effectively on the Missouri River. Upstream speed was not faster than that of a common riverboat and the silt-filled river water often clogged the steam boilers.

== Complement ==
Long, the commander of the scientific component, was allowed to pick the members of the scientific party. Dr. William Baldwin was surgeon and botanist, Augustus E. Jessup was geologist, Thomas Say was zoologist, Titian Peale was assistant naturalist, and Samuel Seymour was illustrator. Of the military men in the scientific component, Major Thomas Biddle was official diarist while Lieutenant James Duncan Graham and Cadet William Swift were assistant topographers. The Indian Agent Major Benjamin O'Fallon accompanied the expedition. There were also a sergeant and eight privates for manual labor and close protection. The actual crew of the Western Engineer was a pilot, a clerk, a carpenter, a steam engineer and two boys. The steam engineer was actually a mechanic, as the Army could not afford to pay for an experienced engineer. Long commanded the boat aided by Graham, who took command and remained aboard when the party traveled overland in the summer of 1820.

== Voyages ==
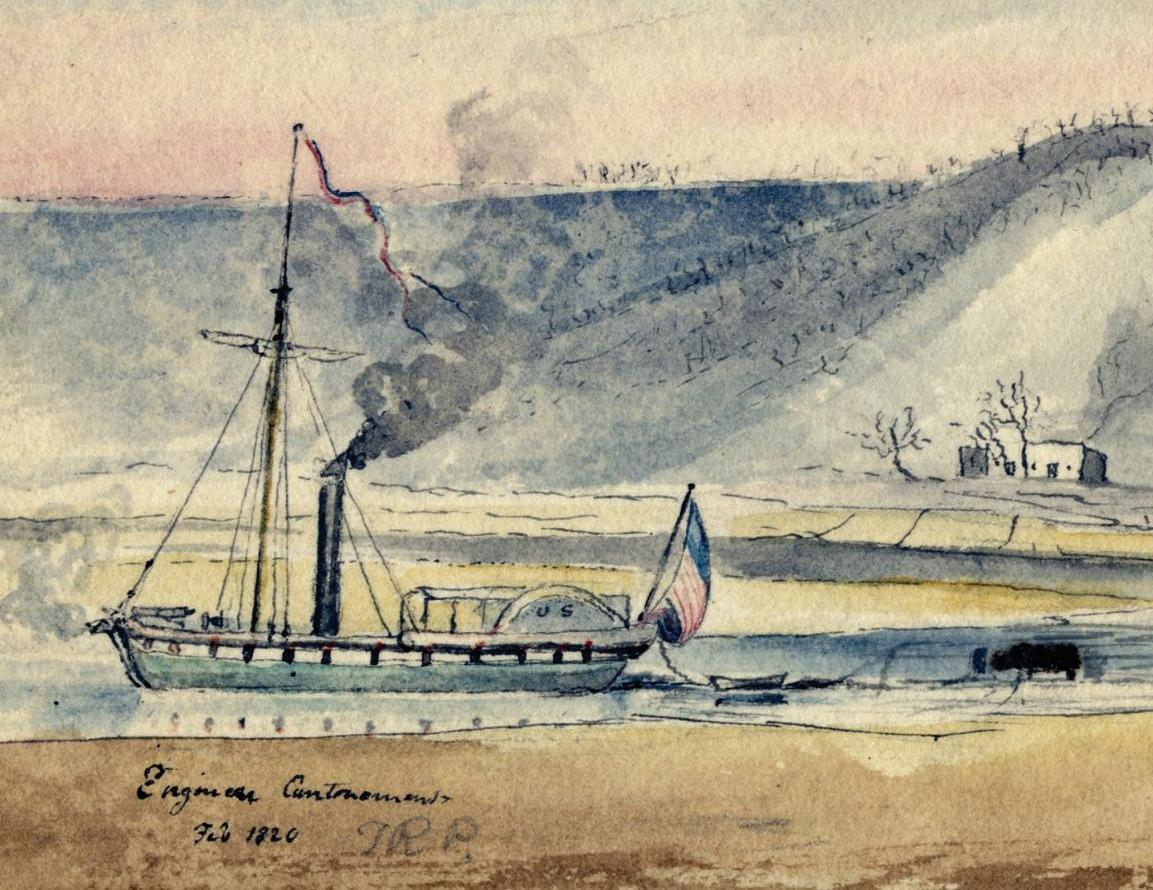
Western Engineer at Engineer Cantonment.

The first voyage of the Western Engineer began on May 5, 1819 under Long's command. With scholars, officers and artillerists aboard and followed by keelboats with troops from the 6th U.S. Infantry, it took her 36 days down the Ohio and up the Mississippi. At Maysville, Kentucky strong winds pushed her into the riverside, but she passed the Falls of the Ohio (at present-day Louisville, Kentucky) without difficulties and reached Saint Louis on June 9, 1819.

The second voyage began on June 21, 1819 as part of the Yellowstone expedition. Going upriver on the Missouri the small Western Engineer was slowed by strong counter-currents and hindered by sandbars and log jams of driftwood. The valves of her engine became fatigued by the alluvial sand in the river water used in her boilers. She reached Fort Lisa close to present day Omaha Nebraska on September 9, 1819. The scientific party of the expedition then went into winter quarters at a point Long called Engineer Cantonment.

The failure of the steamboats of the military party to follow Western Engineer led to a change of plans for the scientific party. It would leave the Western Engineer and proceed on foot along the Platte River towards the Rocky Mountains on what would become Long's Expedition of 1820. In the spring of 1820, Long therefore handed over the command of the Western Engineer to Graham and ordered him to proceed to Saint Louis.

After arriving at Saint Louis, Graham followed orders and took the Western Engineer on her fourth voyage; up the Mississippi to the Des Moines Rapids and then down to Cape Girardeau, while charting the course of the river. At the end of this voyage, Long wanted her to return to Pittsburgh, but the water stage on the Ohio was too low even for the Western Engineer, and she was left at Smithland, Kentucky.
