= Samuel Seymour (artist) =

American painter, engraver and illustrator

Samuel Seymour (ca. 1775–ca. 1832) was a painter, engraver, and illustrator who documented Native American people and the scenery from expeditions of Stephen Harriman Long in 1819, 1820, and 1823. Some of the drawings captured new species of flora and fauna.

He was described as "the first of the far western expeditionary artists". Prior to that, he was born in England or Scotland and came to the United States as a young man. Seymour was trained and worked as an engraver. He began painting landscapes, with his work exhibited at the Pennsylvania Academy of the Fine Arts.

== Early life ==
Samuel Seymour was born about 1775 in England or Scotland. He came to the United States as a young man. He was trained to be an engraver.

== Philadelphia ==
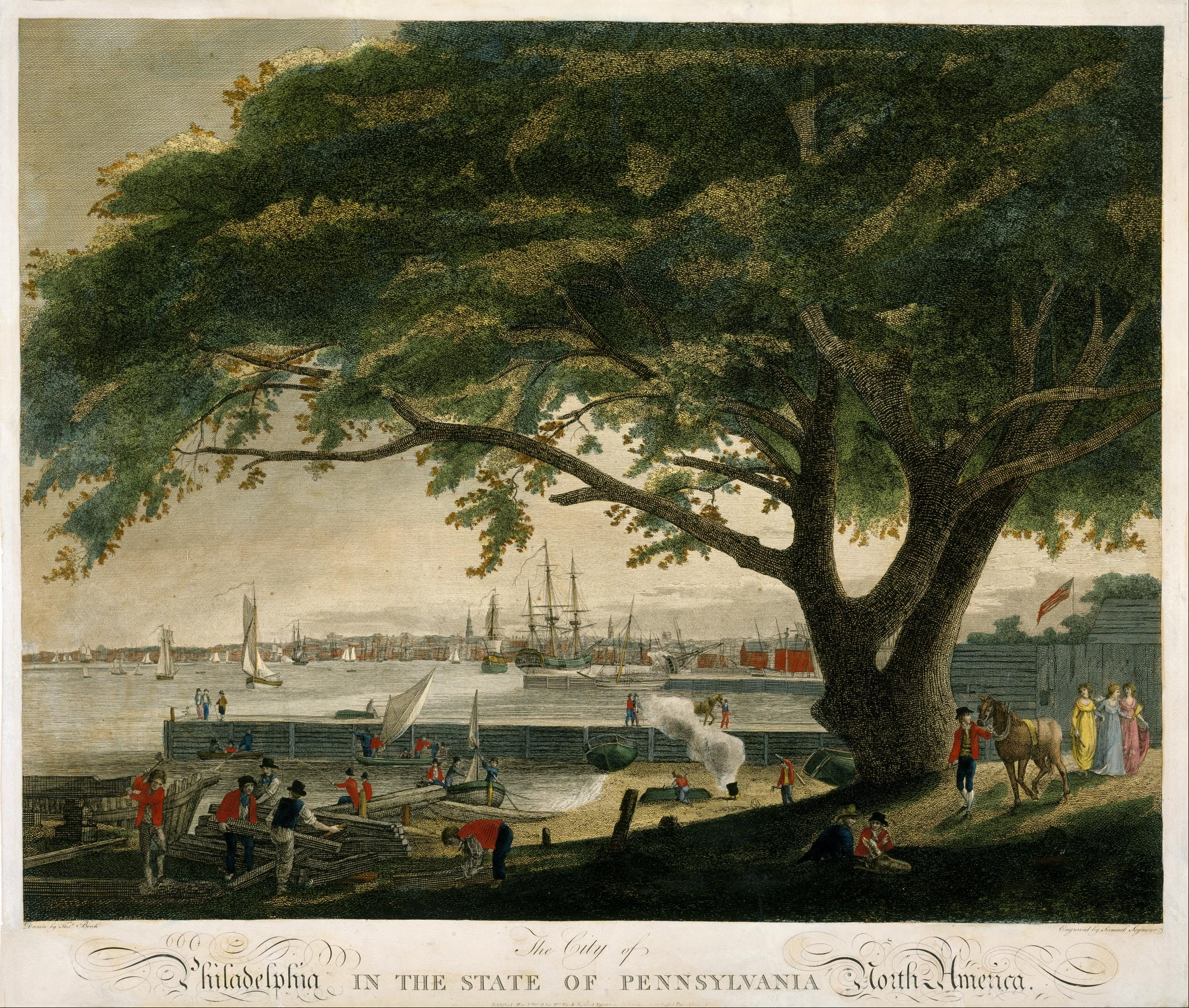
Samuel Seymour, The City of Philadelphia in the State of Pennsylvania, North America, 1801

Seymour completed five panels in 1795 for the American edition of the Encyclopædia Britannica printed by Thomas Dobson. He established himself in Philadelphia by 1796, where he was an engraver and painter through 1822. He was a colleague of Thomas Sully and made engravings of William Birch's work in 1801, 1803, and 1804. Reconstruction following the occupation of British military during the American Revolutionary War was completed by 1803. Birch and Seymour worked together to create two variations of an illustration of Brooklyn Heights on a single engraving plate. Both depicted churches attended by diverse populations of people, including the Middle Dutch Church, St. Paul's Chapel, Trinity Church, and Presbyterian Church. Ships were moored on the river. A second version included picnickers and a grazing horse in the foreground. Prints from the engravings were hand-colored. His engraving of Thomas Birch's Philadelphia, taken from Kensington drawing of 1811 is among the collection of the Philadelphia Museum of Art.

His works were exhibited at the Pennsylvania Academy of the Fine Arts shows, along the works of well-known artists. As an associate of the academy, his social circle included the Peale family, John Wesley Jarvis, Thomas Birch, Benjamin Latrobe, and William Rush. The Academy's collection includes Study of a Bird made by Seymour after Anne Bartram and Man directing woman into a cave, an engraving of John James Barralet's work, and other illustrations. Most of the works that he exhibited at the Academy were plein air landscapes and yet he mainly focused his energy on his commercial engraving business.

Either directly or through his connections, Seymour was familiar with the nation's leading artistic and scientific organizations: the Academy of Natural Sciences of Philadelphia, Philadelphia Museum of Art, and American Philosophical Society. Seymour was an associate member of the Society of Artists. He became increasingly interested in landscape paintings and traveled to the countryside with Sully and along the Schuylkill River with Jarvis and Birch to make sketches.

One of the principal means Seymour devised to unify his geologic landscapes or "scenographic geologic illustrations" both compositionally and thematically was his artistic focus on origination, a typos with relevance for a range of intellectual endeavors and institutions including the nation's oldest and most prestigious organizations for the advancement of knowledge, the American Philosophical Society and the Academy of Natural Sciences, both of Philadelphia.

— Kenneth Haltman

These organizations helped define the objective for Stephen Harriman Long's scientific expeditions.

== Long expeditions ==
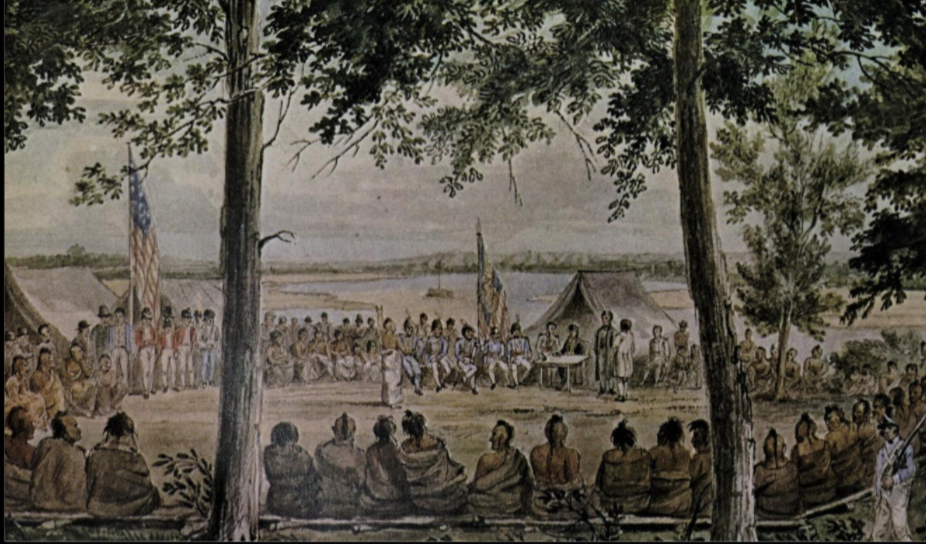
Pawnees Indian Council during Major Long's expedition at Engineer Cantonment, near Council Bluff, in October 1819, Beinecke Rare Book and Manuscript Library, Yale University

Seymour joined a scientific expedition to explore the Missouri River in 1819. He, along with Titian Peale, were the first trained artists to explore the western frontier and capture scenic landscapes and Native Americans. There were also the "first official artists to accompany a United States government" expedition of the Great Plains. He was with Major Benjamin O'Fallon when he met with Missouria, Otoe, and Pawnee tribes. Among his works was a watercolor that he made of a Pawnee council that included a military party of officers and a band. In it, Pawnee are seated on benches, an American flag flies from a pole, and a Native American leader stepped forward to speak to the audience.

Seymour was also the illustrator for Long's Expedition in 1820 along the Platte River, to the Front Range of the Rocky Mountains, and then along the Arkansas and Canadian Rivers.

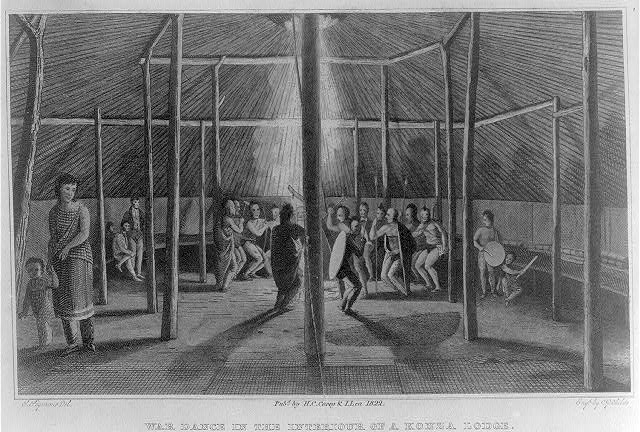
Samuel Seymour, Dog Dance in a Kansa Indian Lodge, August 1819, Beinecke Rare Book and Manuscript Library, Yale University

He was specifically tasked to "furnish sketches of landscapes, whenever we meet with any distinguished for their beauty or grandeur... [and] to paint miniature likenesses, or portraits if required, of distinguished Indians, and exhibit groups of savages engaged in celebrating their festivals, or sitting in council, and in general illustrate any subject, that may be deemed appropriate to his art." For instance, Seymour sketched a scene of Kansa “men howling and dancing about the central fireplace to the accompaniment of a drum and rattles”, which was the first drawing of a farming tribe and dancing Native Americans on the Great Plains. His illustrations, like Kiowa Encampment, provided information about life on the Great Plains.

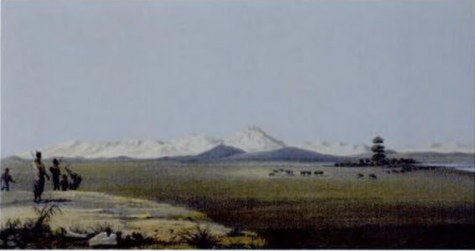
Samuel Seymour, Longs Peak, 1820

After traveling the plains for almost one month, they saw the Rocky Mountains on June 30, 1820. They were about 100 miles east of the mountains near present Fort Morgan, Colorado. Seymour drew the first landscape of the Rocky Mountains, which featured Longs Peak. Seymour made sketches of Platte Canyon valley in the mountains, near Waterton, Colorado. From there, the expedition moved south to the dividing ridge between the Platte and Arkansas river basins.

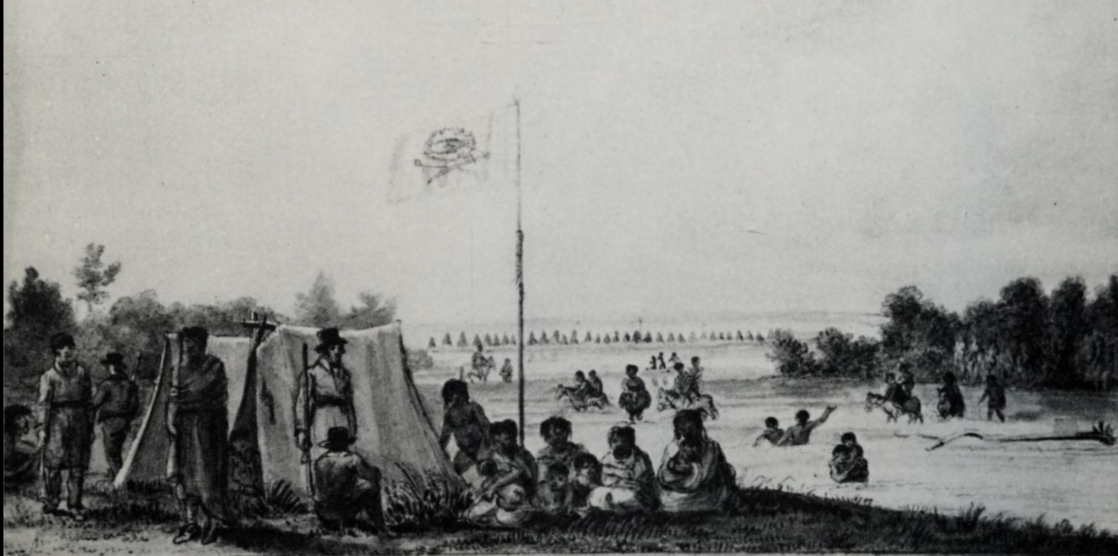
Samuel Seymour, Long expedition of 1820, meeting with Native Americans along the Arkansas River, Beinecke Rare Book and Manuscript Library, Yale University. Some of them brought meat to trade for trinkets.

Along the Arkansas River, they came upon an encampment of Arapaho, Cheyenne, Kiowa, and Kiowa Apache. Seymour captured the image of the Native American chiefs crossing the river to the expedition's campsite to meet with Captain John R. Bell. Over three weeks, Captain Bell's party traveled down the Arkansas River and saw Arapaho heading out to do battle, Comanche returning with their wounded after a fight with the Otoes, and Cheyenne after they raided a group of Pawnee. There are no surviving illustrations by Seymour of this time.

Long's party, who had divided from Bell's party to follow the Red River. They reunited at Fort Smith of Arkansas Territory, the last stop on their expedition. Seymour made drawings of the fort. He traveled through New Orleans on his way back to Philadelphia, where he arrived in December 1820. He created 150 drawings of Native Americans, wildlife, and scenery, including the river valleys and Rocky Mountains. The drawings were "literal transcriptions of nature."

In the field, Seymour used a kind of shorthand to create a quick sketch to be embellished for the metal engraving plate. For instance, he used tight little loops for foliage. There were instances in which publishers changed the composition. For instance, Seymour drew a "picturesque Indian and white hunter" for context in this watercolor View of the Chasm, but the figures were removed from the illustration, which lost the depiction of a friendly encounter between white and Native American men. It also made the mountain foothills appear stark.

Many of the illustrations documented new species of plants and animals. A number of his works were lost over the years. There are only 17 known works that he made that remain from the 1819-1820 expedition.

He traveled again with Long during his expedition of 1823 of the Upper Mississippi River, Lake of the Woods, and the Red River of the North. They traveled to the headwaters of St. Peter's River in present Minnesota. Biographer John G. McDermott believes that Seymour "was the first man with any artistic skill" to travel through the area with the intention of capturing scenic landscapes of present-day Minnesota. He arrived home by October 26, and likely finished his paintings from the exploration by mid-1824.

== Later years ==
A Samuel Seymour lived in Newark, New Jersey in the 1830s. His wife was Mary Ann and they had six children, including four daughters: Emma, Francis, Maria, and Mary. At the time of his will of 1833, some of the children were underage. He gave his daughter Emma the painting Fort Smith, Arkansas, 1820 in Newark.

== Gallery ==
Works of Samuel Seymour
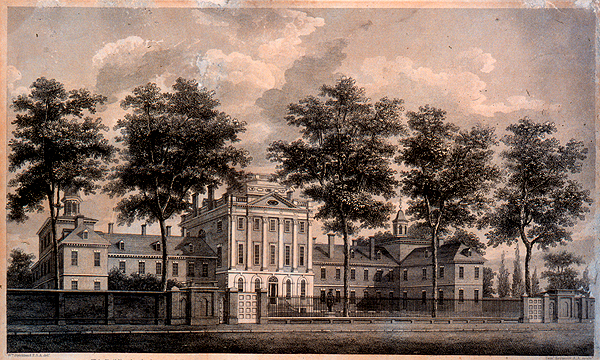
The Building by the Bounty of Government and many Private Persons was proudly founded for the Relief of the Sick and Miserable, Pennsylvania Hospital, engraving made by Samuel Seymour in 1811 of William Strickland's work

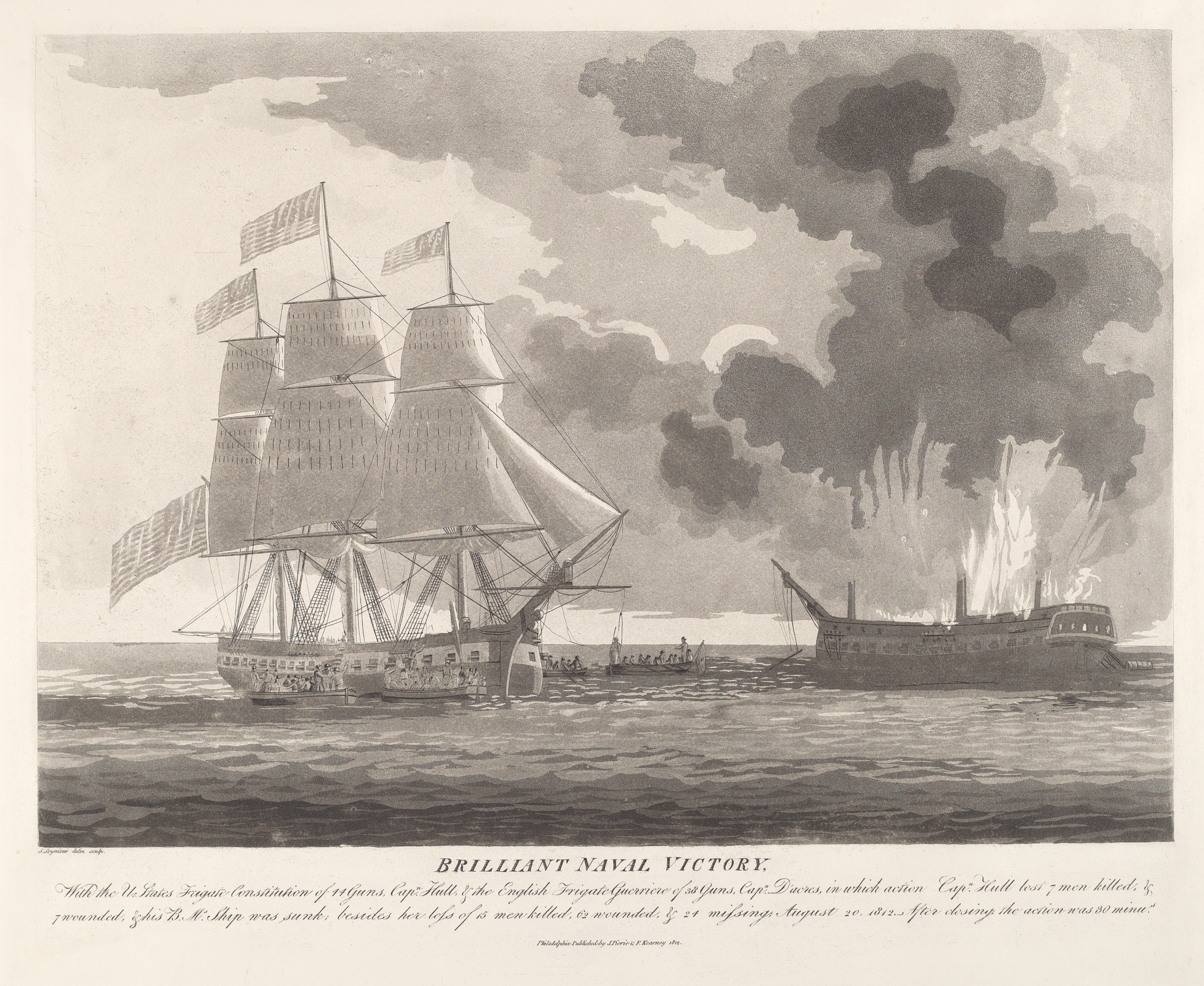
Samuel Seymour, Brilliant Naval Victory, 1812

== Bibliography ==
- Ewers, John Canfield (1965). Artists of the Old West. Garden City, New York: Doubleday. ISBN 978-0-385-04474-5.
- Haltman, Kenneth (1996). "The Poetics of Geologic Reverie: Figures of Source and Origin in Samuel Seymour's Landscapes of the Rocky Mountains". Huntington Library Quarterly. 59 (2/3): 303–347. doi:10.2307/3817670. ISSN 0018-7895.
- Haltman, Kenneth (2008). Looking Close and Seeing Far: Samuel Seymour, Titian Ramsay Peale, and the Art of the Long Expedition, 1818–1823. Penn State Press. ISBN 978-0-271-04782-9.
- Nichols, Roger L. (1995). Stephen Long and American frontier exploration. Norman : University of Oklahoma Press. ISBN 978-0-8061-2724-8.
- Woods, Willis F.; Macapia, Paul; Macapia, Mary E.; Seattle Art Museum (1976). Lewis and Clark's America : Seattle Art Museum, July 15-September 26, 1976. Seattle: Seattle Art Museum.
