= Yellowstone expedition =

19th-century expedition of the northern United States

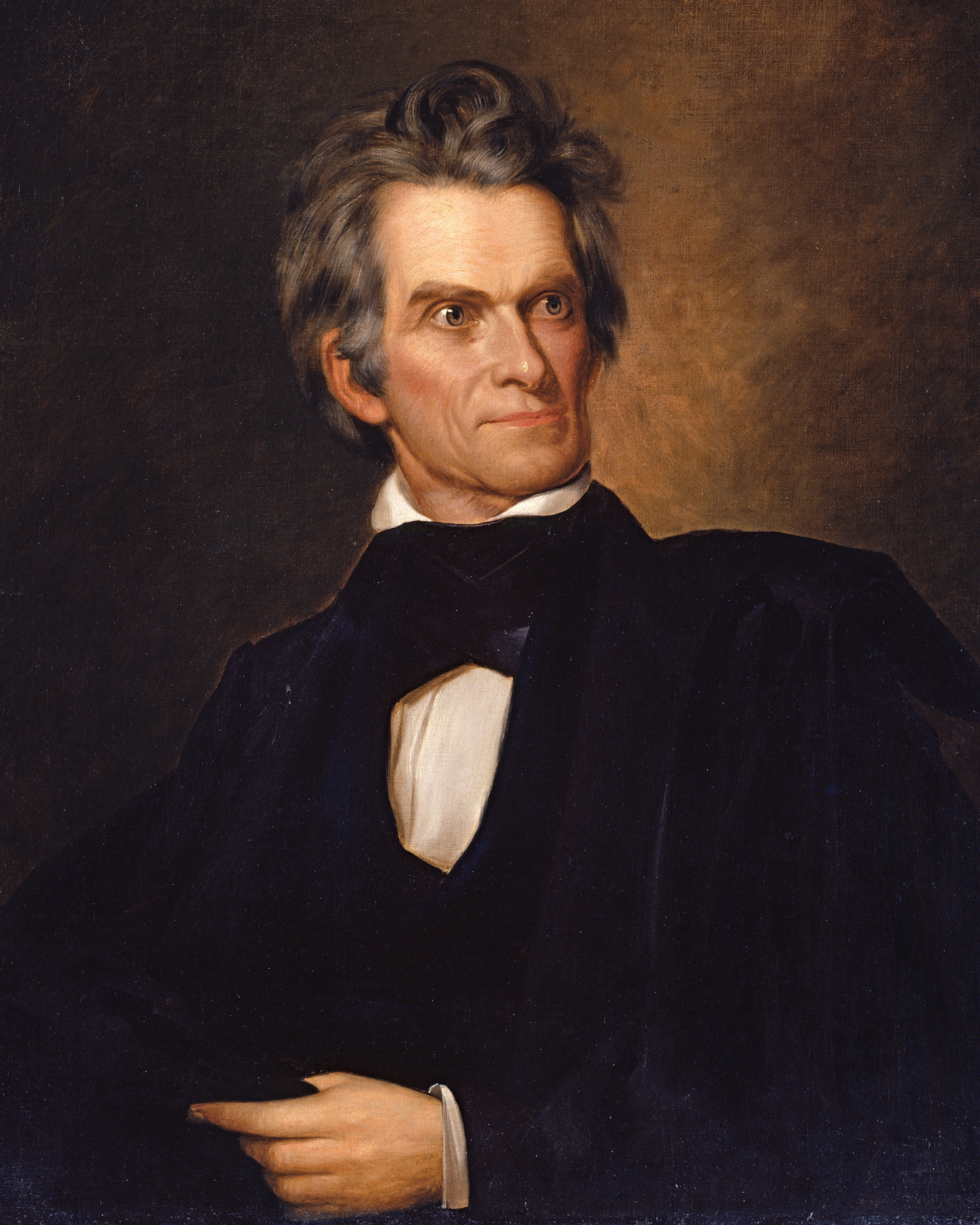
Secretary of War John C. Calhoun authorized the Yellowstone Expedition.

The Yellowstone expedition was an expedition to the American frontier in 1819 and 1820 authorized by United States Secretary of War John C. Calhoun, with the goal of establishing a military fort or outpost at the mouth of the Yellowstone River in present-day North Dakota. Sometimes called the Atkinson–Long Expedition after its two principal leaders, Colonel Henry Atkinson and Major Stephen Harriman Long, it led to the creation of Fort Atkinson in present-day Nebraska, the first United States Army post established west of the Missouri River, but was otherwise a costly failure, stalling near Council Bluffs, Iowa.

== Background ==
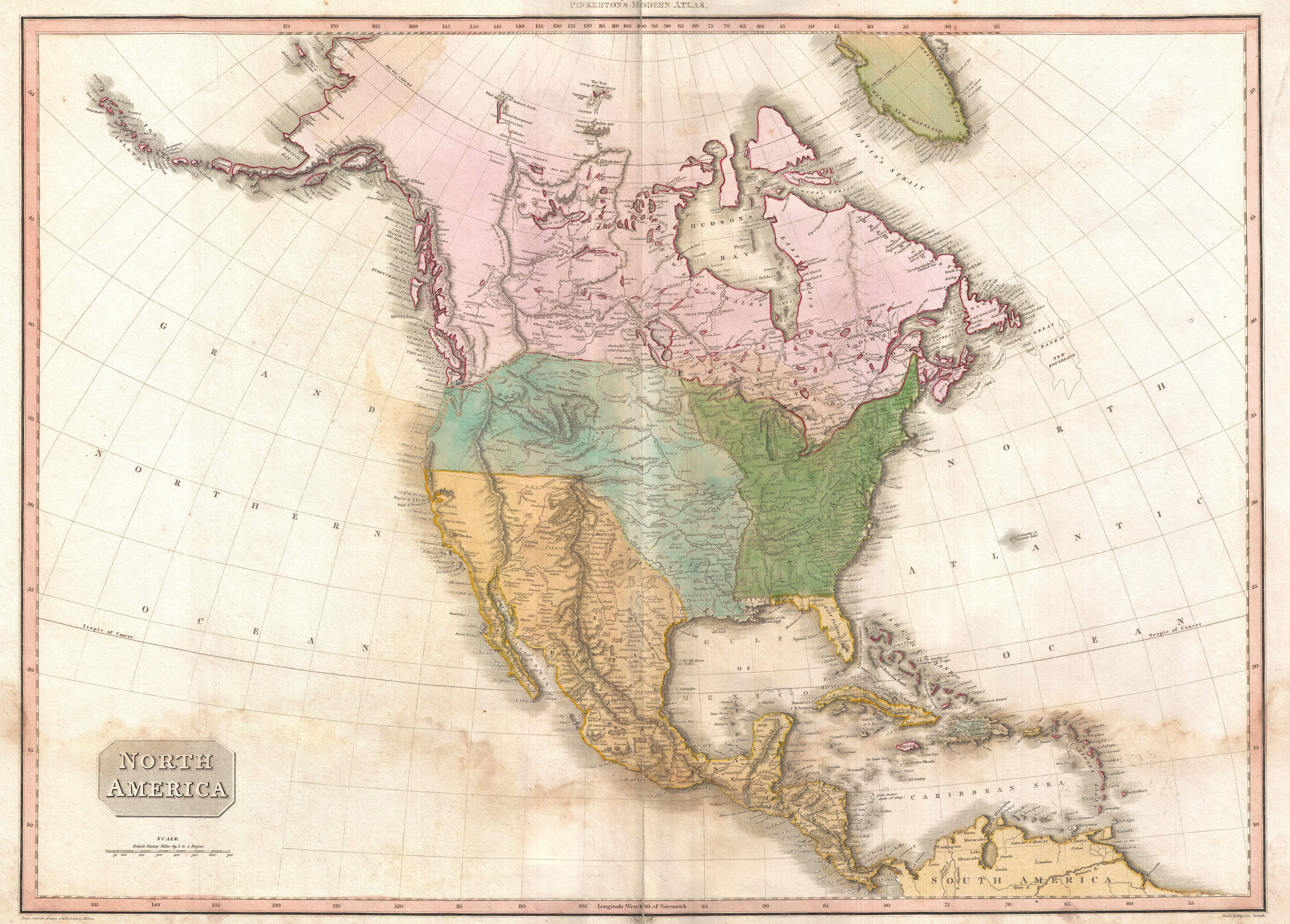
Map of North America, from an 1818 U.S. edition of Pinkerton's Atlas, showing the approximate area of the 1803 Louisiana Purchase west of the Mississippi River

Secretary Calhoun stated the expedition was a "part of a system of measures" to maintain northwestern trade, describing its objects as "the protection of our northwestern frontier and the greater extension of our fur trade." The economic condition had halted in the states due to growing dissent over state issues that were to lead up to the American Civil War, and this gave the expedition military as well as economic purpose.

Starting from St. Louis, Missouri, the expedition aimed to establish a series of forts along the Missouri River on the way upstream to the Yellowstone River, the principal tributary of the upper Missouri, which meets the Missouri in what is now western North Dakota. These forts were intended to increase the American presence in the fur trade and to counteract British influence on the northern plains. The first fort was to be at the Council Bluff (not to be confused with Council Bluffs, Iowa, 20 miles to the south), the site previously used for an 1804 council between the Lewis and Clark Expedition and members of the Oto and Missouria Native American tribes. William Clark had recommended the high bluff overlooking the Missouri River to the U.S. government as a suitable location to build a fort.

=== Preparations ===
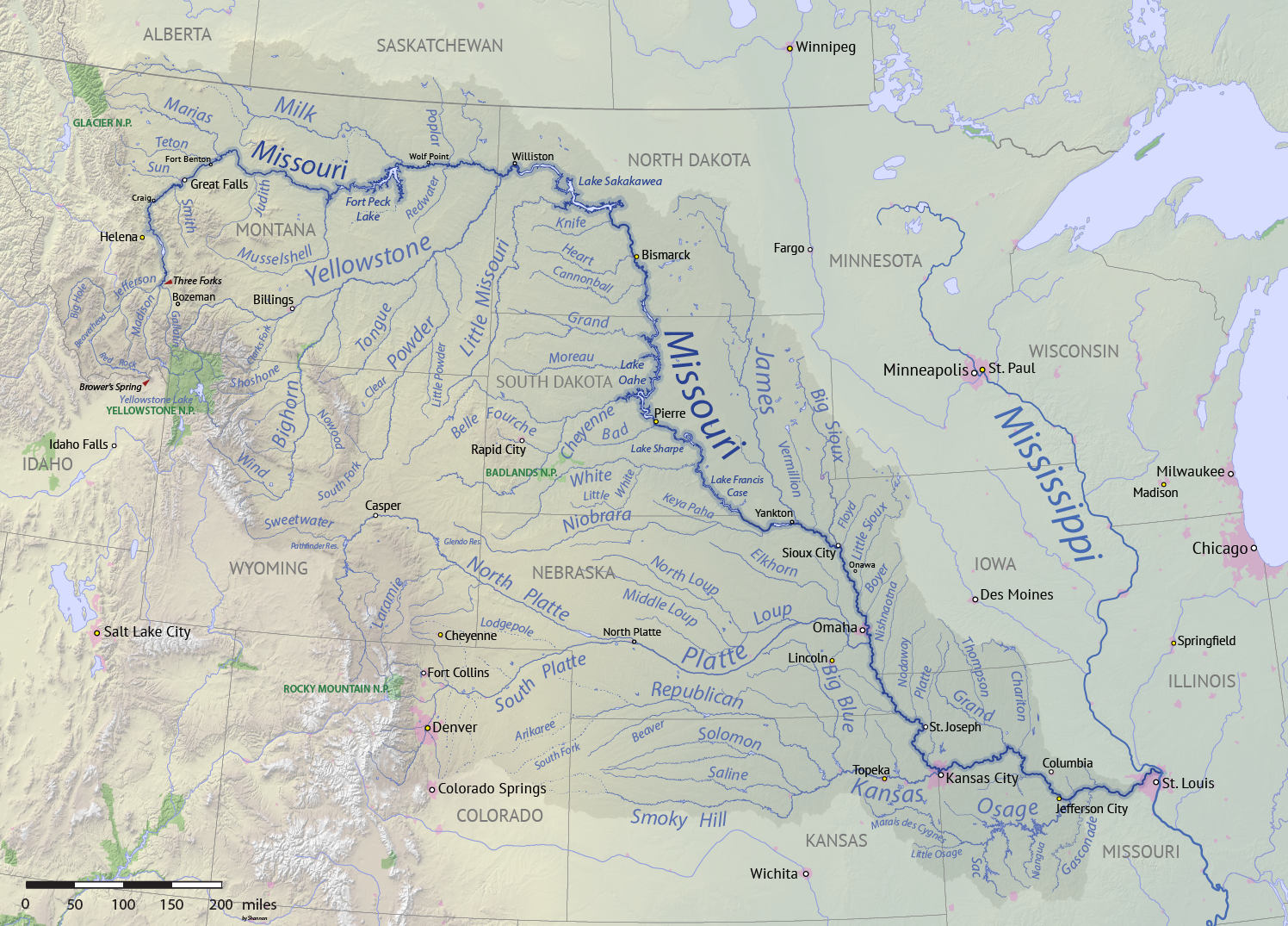
Map of the Missouri River watershed with tributaries and states labelled.

In 1818, Calhoun awarded the expedition's transportation and supply contract to James Johnson, partner and younger brother of Kentucky Congressman Richard Mentor Johnson, who would later become Vice President of the United States. Richard Johnson enjoyed considerable leverage over the expedition's funding as chairman from 1817 to 1819 of the House Committee on Expenditures in the Department of War, and there was warm public interest in the enterprise. An editorial of the Missouri Gazette of St. Louis said on April 21, 1819, that "there is no measure which has been adopted by the present administration that has received such universal commendation." The public's later "deep disappointment at their non-fulfilment" was to coincide with an eventual "scandal growing out of the transportation contract", with revelations that James Johnson had been practically guaranteed against loss and had thus taken little care to see that his equipment was of sufficient character to ensure a prompt fulfillment of the contract.

The Yellowstone expedition was led by Colonel (later General) Henry Atkinson, commander of the 6th Infantry, then stationed at Plattsburgh, New York on the U.S.–Canada border. In the fall of 1818, he received orders to rendezvous his troops to the south and encamp with the Rifle Regiment by the Missouri River near St. Louis. The 6th Infantry hastily traveled the 2,700 miles by land and water to the area.

The expedition was also chartered to perform science and engineering functions, in conjunction with which a U.S. Army topographical engineer, Major Stephen Harriman Long, was ordered to select and lead a crew of notable specialists in zoology, geology, cartography, journalism, art and botany to accompany the expedition. It was the first scientific expedition of U.S. government-funded "Army Engineers" charged with mapping, studying, documenting and exploring the vast area of uncharted land between the Mississippi River and the Rocky Mountains.

=== Steamboat Western Engineer ===
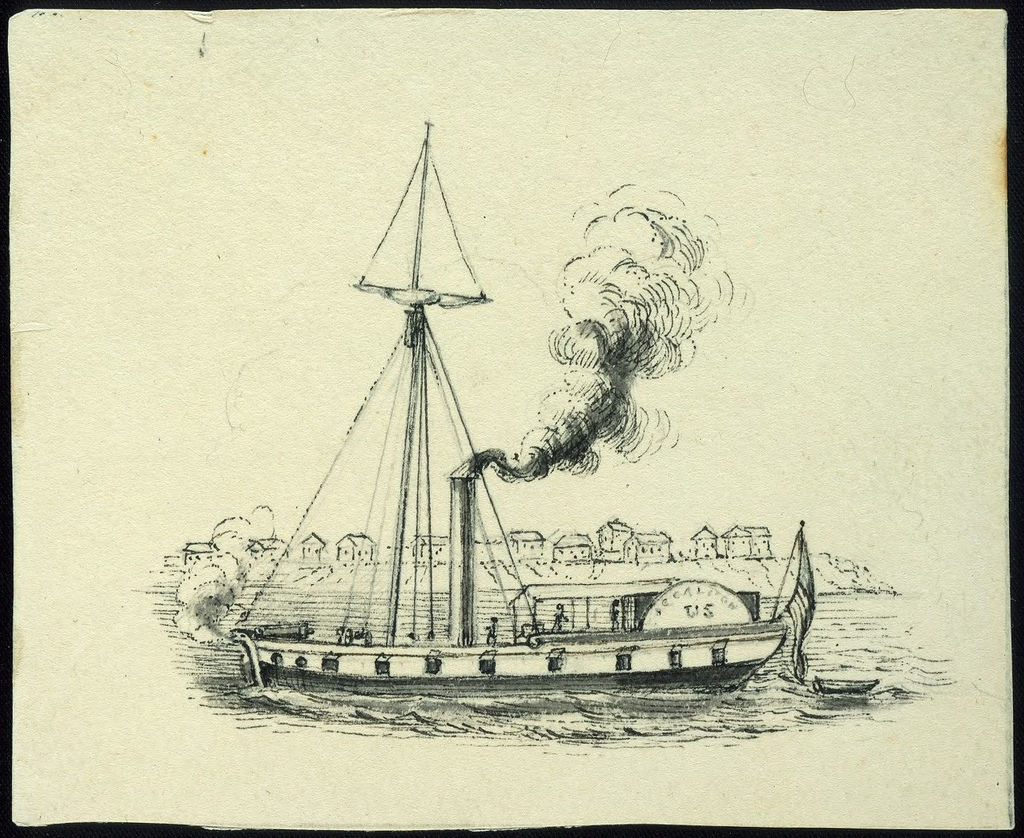
Steamboat Western Engineer.

Major Long immediately planned the construction of an experimental steamboat to transport the task force of scientists as far as possible on the venture. Named the Western Engineer, it was uniquely designed to navigate the expected narrow, shallow, snag-littered channels of the Missouri River and its tributaries, with a particularly strong engine for increased power against swift currents. Another novel feature was a paddlewheel built into the stern to reduce the danger of damage from snags. The vessel was launched in Pittsburgh, Pennsylvania in the winter of 1818–19, and was probably the first stern-wheel paddle steamer ever built.

The boat had a 75-by-13-foot (22.9 by 4.0 m) hull with the weight of the machinery carefully distributed to permit increased maneuverability in shallow channels. To protect the vessel from Indian attack, Long installed a bulletproof pilothouse, mounted a cannon on the bow, placed howitzers along the side, and armed the crew with rifles and sabres. Nicknamed "Long's Dragon" because it was decorated as a serpent in order to deter and frighten any hostile frontier natives, it was anything but a typical steamboat of its day. Its hull drew only 19 inches (48 cm) of water compared to the 5 or 6 feet (1.5 or 1.8 m) of most steamboats of the era. Its basic design (shallow draft, rear paddlewheel, narrow beam, amidships engine) later became the prototype for western river steam vessels.

A description in the Missouri Gazette of May 26, 1819 stated that "The Western Engineer is well armed and carries an elegant flag representing a white man and an Indian shaking hands, the calumet of peace and the sword. The boat is 75 feet long, 13 feet beam and draws 19 inches of water. The steam passes off through the mouth of a larger figure-head (a serpent)...". This was the first steamboat to travel up the Missouri River into the Louisiana Purchase territory all the way to Nebraska.

=== Expedition departure ===
The 6th U.S. Infantry and 1st Rifle Regiments made up the expedition's military component. They departed from St. Louis, Missouri in May 1819, when Colonel Atkinson led his force of 1,126 riflemen upriver on three well-equipped, state-of-the-art steamboats. Major Long later followed with the scientific party of "Army Engineers" aboard the Western Engineer, leaving in June. Notable expedition members included Captain Stephen Kearny (later military governor of California), landscape painter Samuel Seymour, naturalist and painter Titian Peale, and zoologist Thomas Say.

Atkinson's party suffered a variety of problems from the outset, including an inefficient and corrupt steamboat captain. Five steamboats had been contracted for Atkinson, but two had not reached the Mississippi at all and, of the remainder, a third (the Thomas Jefferson) was soon found incapable of navigating the numerous snags, sandbars and currents. She and her crew were left behind, some forty miles below Franklin. The last two (the R.M. Johnson and the Expedition) also could not advance through the treacherous obstacles and were stopped just above the mouth of the Kansas River, to winter at Cow Island and return to St. Louis in the spring. After several days and many miles, Atkinson's troops had to resort back to using keelboats similar to those used by Lewis and Clark a few years earlier, which were powered mainly by men rowing, poling or towing upriver with ropes.

=== Autumn 1819 ===
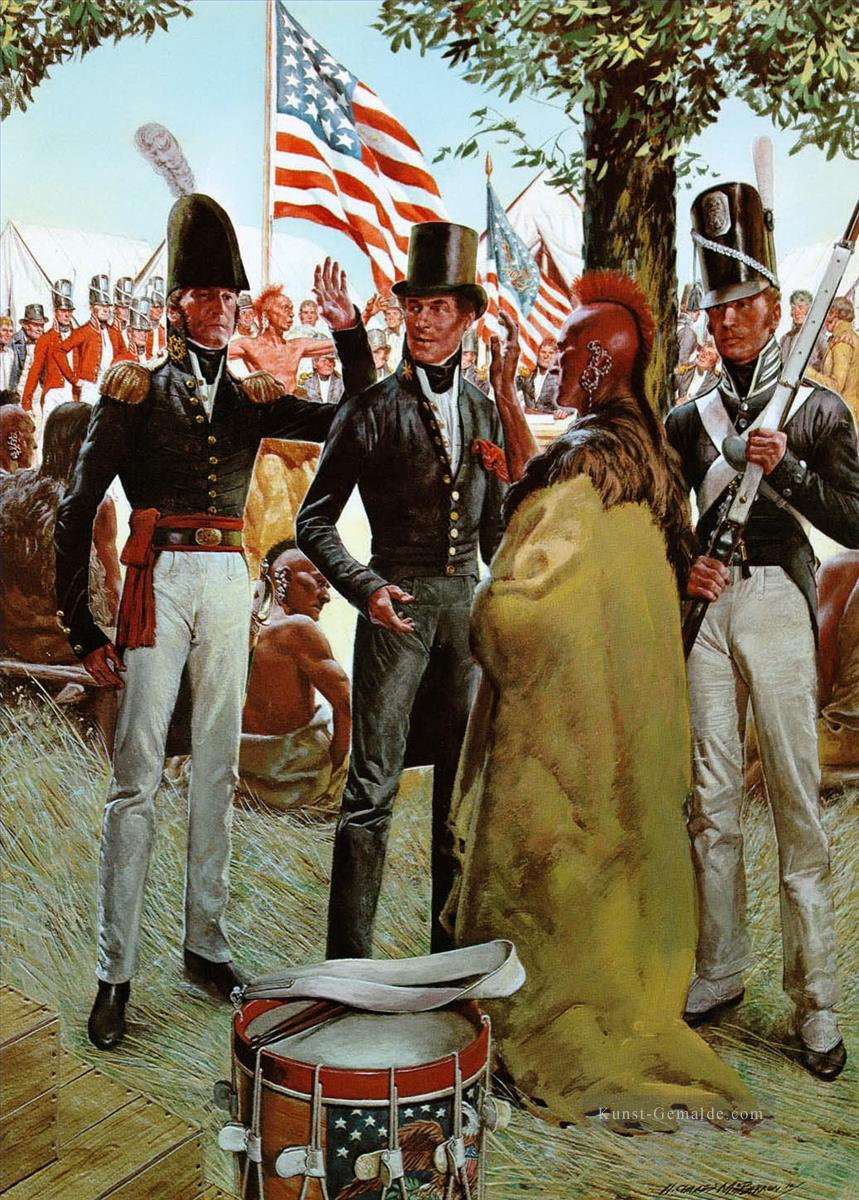
Major Long meets with the Pawnees at Council Bluff, Nebraska, 1819.

The expedition left the mouth of the Kansas River on August 13, 1819, and arrived at the mouth of the Grand Nemaha River two weeks later. On September 17, the steamboat Western Engineer arrived at Fort Lisa, a trading post belonging to William Clark's Missouri Fur Company. This was on the west side of the river, about 20 miles north of today's Council Bluffs, Iowa. "The Council Bluffs" was at that time the generic name for the land on both sides of the Missouri River upstream of the mouth of the Platte River, and Fort Lisa was located "at a point between five and six miles below the original Council Bluff - where Lewis and Clark had a council with the Missouri and Otoe Indians, August 3, 1804, and now the site of the town of Fort Calhoun...".

Atkinson's troops arrived several days later, on September 26. The parties then decided to build two camps for winter quarters, establishing Atkinson's troops in "Cantonment Missouri" near Council Bluff and Major Long's men at "Engineer Cantonment", five miles down the river near the western riverbank, and half a mile upstream from Fort Lisa. Within a month, the quarters were substantially completed and Major Long returned to the east coast for further orders.

=== Winter 1819–20 ===
"Cantonment Missouri", set along the river bottom below the bluffs, was short-lived. The winter of 1819–20 was very harsh, and a shortfall of government contractors left the garrison without sufficient supplies. The soldiers suffered widespread scurvy (due to poor nutrition and lack of vitamin C), which claimed the lives of over 200 of the 1,126 men that first winter. Estimates of the civilian deaths is possibly as high as double the military dead; no records were kept of their losses. Finally, in the spring of 1820, the Missouri River flooded Cantonment Missouri, so the soldiers built a permanent camp atop Council Bluff, and renamed it Fort Atkinson. Just east of present-day Fort Calhoun, Nebraska, it was abandoned in 1827.

== Failure of the expedition ==
Due to its financial costs and general lack of first season results, the expedition became a resounding failure upon stalling at Fort Lisa. Congressional economy measures and difficulties in supplying such distant outposts prevented the completion of the expedition and the force was halted there, well downstream of its intended destination at the mouth of the Yellowstone River.

In May 1820, Long returned to "Engineer Cantonment" with his own orders from the Secretary of War to cease work along the Missouri and turn instead to exploring the Platte River and its sources. The expedition left their winter quarters on June 6, 1820. Colonel Atkinson led a further expedition to reach the Yellowstone River in 1825.

=== Financial issues and over-extravagant planning ===
At about the time that the Yellowstone expedition departed from St. Louis, the Panic of 1819 brought an end to the economic expansion that followed the War of 1812. In December 1819, Secretary of the Treasury William H. Crawford issued a report projecting a budget deficit of five million dollars. Added to this, the costs of the expedition grossly exceeded those anticipated, mostly due to James Johnson's "malfeasance" and his brother Richard's influential pleas for further funding. The political reputation of James and Richard Johnson was mostly maintained, however, due to their respective popularity in their home district.

In 1905, writer H.M. Chittendem summarized the expedition as:

an unqualified failure if not a huge fiasco... Although the troops could with ease have marched three times as far as the boats carried them, it was considered necessary to transport them in a manner becoming the dignity of so vast an enterprise. As a result it took an entire season to reach a point that could have been reached in two months at most.

He wrote further that:

The same spirit of absurd extravagance pervaded the scientific branch of the enterprise. If Major Long had been content with a sentible field equipment transported on pack mules, or on a keelboat while on the Missouri, he could have kept his party in the field for five years,, and have explored the entire region east of the mountains, for less money than his actual operations took in 1819 alone. The insignificant results of the first season's work, and the scandal growing out of the transportation contract, disgusted Congress with the whole enterprise and that body declined to appropriate any further funds for it.

== See also ==
- Stephen Harriman Long, for his 1820 and 1823 expeditions up the Platte and the Red River of the North
