= Cabanne's Trading Post =

Coordinates: 41°22′32″N 95°57′31″W

- Cabanne Archeological Site
- U.S. National Register of Historic Places
- Location within Nebraska Location within the United States
- Location: Omaha, Nebraska
- Built: 1822
- NRHP reference No.: 72000749
- Added to NRHP: May 5, 1972

Cabanne's Trading Post was established in 1822 by the American Fur Company as Fort Robidoux near present-day Dodge Park in North Omaha, Nebraska, United States. It was named for the influential fur trapper Joseph Robidoux. Soon after it was opened, the post was called the French Company or Cabanné's Post, for the ancestry and name of its operator, Jean-Pierre Cabanné, who was born and raised among the French community of St. Louis, Missouri.

Located 10 miles north of Omaha, Nebraska; six miles south of Fort Atkinson, and 2 miles south of Fort Lisa, Cabanné's Post was an important link in relations between the United States and Native American tribes in the Louisiana Purchase. The Cabanné Archaeological Site was listed on the National Register of Historic Places in 1972.

== History ==
Prince Maximilian of Wied-Neuwied, who toured the Louisiana Purchase extensively, visited the Post in 1823 and wrote highly of it, praising Cabanné and the accommodations. Part of the success of Cabanné's Post was that it provisioned the garrison at nearby Fort Atkinson (1819–27) so had a steady business. Cabanné recruited traders and trappers for the American Fur Company, which expanded under John Jacob Astor to monopolize the American fur trade. Among Cabanne's recruits was Joseph Marie La Barge, namesake of La Barge, Wyoming. Cabanné operated the post until 1833.

Consisting by then of a row of storehouses, shops, and houses, the post in 1833 was taken over by Joshua Pilcher. He managed it until the American Fur Company folded its operations about 1840 into those at Fontenelle's Post at present-day Bellevue, Nebraska, as the fur trade had declined in economic importance. Peter A. Sarpy later took over management of Fontenelle's Post.

The site of Cabanné's Trading Post is north of present-day Dodge Park by Florence in North Omaha. Cabanné's Post Archaeological Site is listed on the National Register of Historic Places and is a featured site on the Lewis and Clark Scenic Byway.

A house built on the site and in the style of Cabanné's House in St. Louis is a listed historic site.

== See also ==
- List of Registered Historic Places in Douglas County, Nebraska
- Nebraska Territory
- History of North Omaha, Nebraska
- Landmarks in North Omaha, Nebraska

== Related publications ==
- Rock Bottom: A History of Florence, Nebraska by Adam Fletcher Sasse, Olympia, WA: CommonAction, 2024.
- Dictionary of American History by James Truslow Adams, New York: Charles Scribner's Sons, 1940.
- Jensen, M. (1999) The Fontenelle and Cabanné Trading Posts: The History and Archeology of Two Missouri River Sites, 1822-1838, Nebraska State Historical Society.
