= John R. Bell (military officer) =

John R. Bell (ca. 1785–April 11, 1825) was an American military officer who served during the War of 1812. He taught and was a commandant of cadets at West Point in 1819. In 1820, he was the journalist and a leader for the Long's Expedition of 1820. His journal was published as The Journal of Captain John R. Bell, Official Journalist for the Stephen H. Long Expedition to the Rocky Mountains. He was provisional secretary and interim Governor of West Florida between July and August, 1821.

He underwent a court martial between November 27 and December 7, 1821, and was found partially guilty of charges brought by a junior officer. He received half pay for one year and was suspended from command. He served in southeastern military posts and in 1824 he was promoted to brevet major.

== Early life and career ==
John R. Bell was born around 1785 in the state of New York. He attended West Point Military Academy from June 15, 1808, to January 3, 1812. Bell joined to American Army in his youth, place where he stressed, obtaining the commandant and Captain titles. On January 3, 1812, Bell was commissioned a second lieutenant in the light artillery. On August 24, he became a first lieutenant. Bell fought in the Niagara Frontier in 1812. A year later, he helped capture Fort George on the St. Lawrence River and was promoted to major on July 29, 1813. He was made a captain in the artillery and colonel inspector general by the end of the War of 1812. Bell served in Maine and Boston, Massachusetts from 1815 to early 1819, including one year as a superintendent of Recruiting Services. He returned to West Point on February 8, 1819, when he taught infantry tactics and was a commandant of cadets until March 17, 1820. Bell was described as "a tall, handsome and soldierly-looking man, who was with us for more than a year, and who, without abating the rigor of the discipline, showed how it could be maintained consistently with a proper regard for the feelings of those under him." He was remembered for changing the forms of discipline at the academy.

== Long's Expedition of 1820 ==
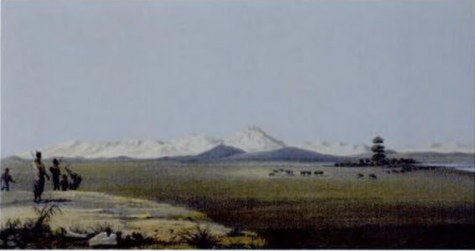
Samuel Seymour, Distant view of the Rocky Mountains, Long Expedition, 1820. Bell recorded of the view, "The whole range had a beautiful and sublime appearance to us, after having been so long confined to the dull and uninteresting monotony of prairie country"

Bell wrote to Secretary of War John C. Calhoun about the open position of journalist on Stephen Harriman Long's expedition of 1820. He asked to be relieved of the "dull rounds of garrison duty" for a chance to explore the western frontier. He joined the expedition that traveled the Platte River to the foothills of the Rocky Mountains, then followed the Arkansas and Red Rivers to the Mississippi River. As the journalist, he kept an account of the expedition's activities and he supervised setting up the campsite. He led the group and set the pace for the desired number of miles that they wanted to travel for the day. A few times he questioned Long's authority and when the expedition divided into two parties, Bell led one of the groups along the Arkansas River. Three men deserted the group, taking scientific reports and manuscripts. The two parties reunited at Fort Smith on September 9, 1820. His journal has been published with the title The Journal of Captain John R. Bell, Official Journalist for the Stephen H. Long Expedition to the Rocky Mountains. Bell was supposed to have sent his journal to Secretary Calhoun, but there is no evidence that he did so. The journal was lost for decades and was finally published in 1957.

== Florida officer and acting governor ==
John R. Bell moved to East Florida, where he was commander of American troops at St. Augustine and provisional secretary. Bell become in a temporary agent to the Seminoles. So, in early 1822, he informed that about 22,000 Amerindians, and 5,000 slaves in possession of them lived in Florida, and that most of them came from places outside Florida. According to him, they had entered the territory fleeing from the Creek War, so they lacked any valid acclamation (in the U.S. view) to Florida. John R. Bell said to Secretary of War John C. Calhoun in a letter he had gone to government warehouses for collecting provisions that would be required for fight against the Seminoles, who were going to return to the place to finish its destruction, according to the same Seminoles had declared. On July 11, 1821, Bell was appointed acting governor of West Florida, office he maintained until August 20, 1821.

Charges were leveled against him by a junior officer and he underwent a court martial between November 27 and December 7, 1821. He was found partially guilty of conduct unbecoming of an officer. John C. Calhoun, the Secretary of War, ordered half pay for one year and suspended him from command.

He became a brevet major on October 10, 1824, after serving in garrisons in Savannah Harbor, Georgia and Fort Moultrie, South Carolina. He retired from the Army due to poor health.

== Death ==
Bell became very ill in early April 1825 and died eight days later on April 11 in Henrietta, New York.
