= Fort Atkinson (Nebraska) =

Fort in Nebraska

Fort Atkinson State Historical Park
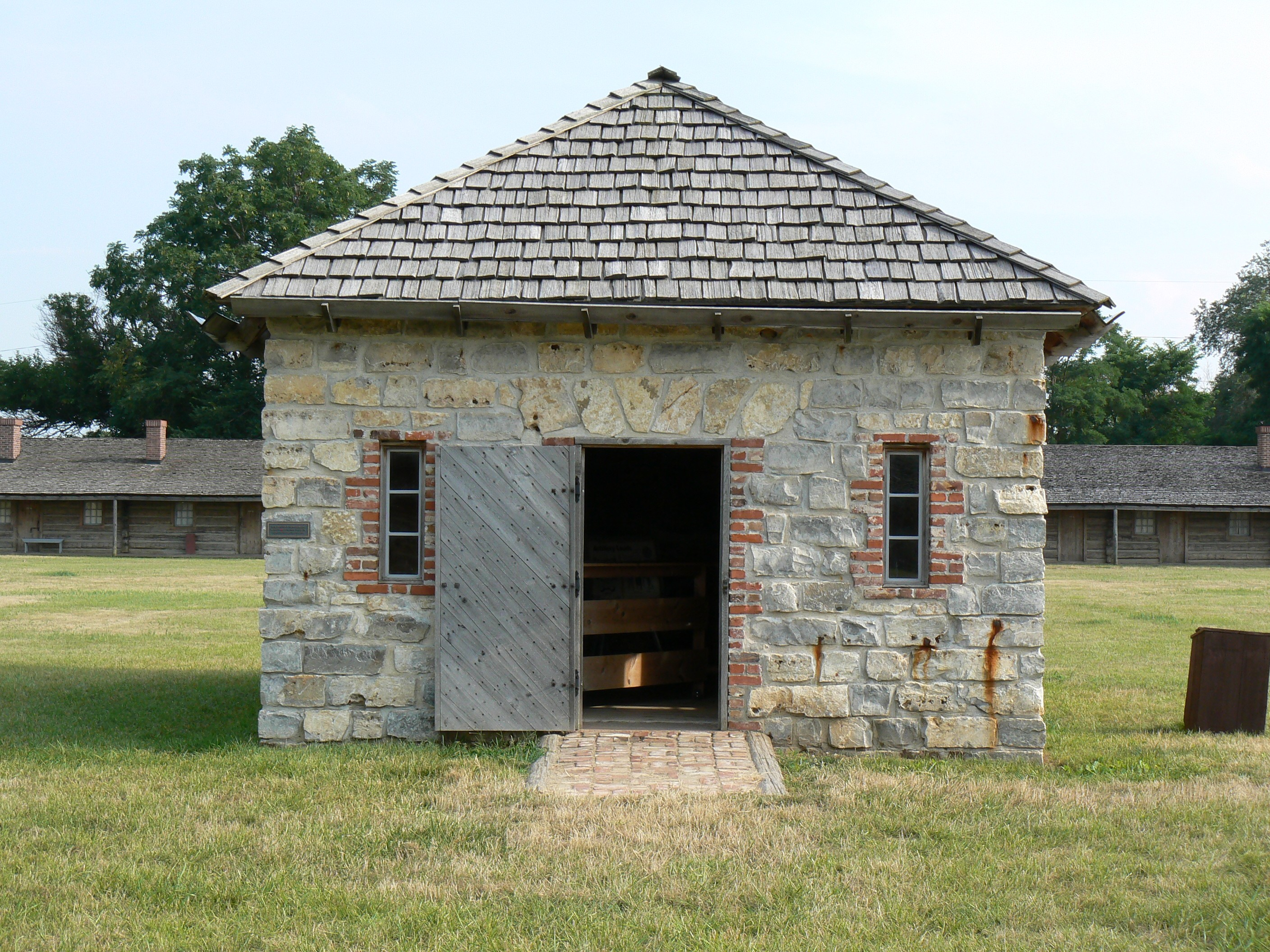
- Powder magazine at Fort Atkinson

- Location within Nebraska Location within the United States
- Location: Fort Calhoun, Nebraska, United States
- Coordinates: 41°27′18″N 96°00′51″W
- Area: 154.36 acres (62.47 ha)
- Elevation: 1,073 ft (327 m)
- Designation: Nebraska state historical park
- Established: 1963
- Visitors: 40280 (in 2017)
- Administrator: Nebraska Game and Parks Commission
- Website: Fort Atkinson State Historical Park
- Fort Atkinson
- U.S. National Register of Historic Places
- U.S. National Historic Landmark
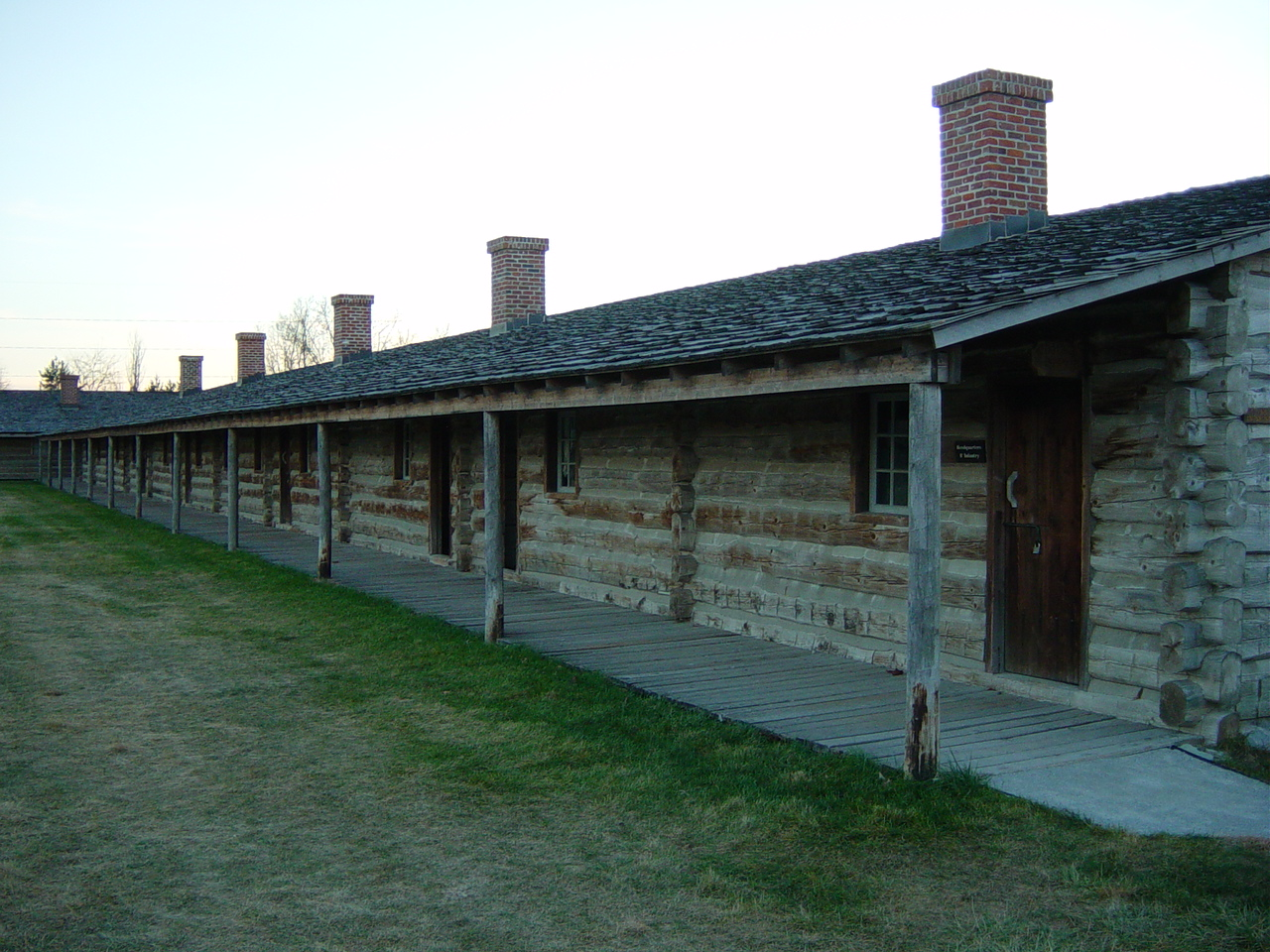
- Detail of (reconstructed) west rampart barracks
- Built: 1819
- NRHP reference No.: 66000454

Significant dates
- Added to NRHP: October 15, 1966
- Designated NHL: July 4, 1961

Fort Atkinson was the first United States Army post to be established west of the Missouri River in the unorganized region of the Louisiana Purchase of the United States. Located just east of present-day Fort Calhoun, Nebraska, the fort was erected in 1819 and abandoned in 1827. The site is now known as Fort Atkinson State Historical Park and is a National Historic Landmark. A replica fort was constructed by the state at the site during the 1980s–1990s.

The post, which included soldiers, traders, trappers, and other frontier people, has been credited by the Nebraska State Legislature as the first town in Nebraska. Founded almost 30 years before the creation of the Nebraska Territory, Fort Atkinson had more than 1,000 residents. It included a brickyard, lime kiln, stone quarry, grist mill, saw mill, and cooper shop.

== Lewis and Clark ==
The site that would become Fort Atkinson was the Council Bluff (not to be confused with Council Bluffs, Iowa, 20 miles to the south, renamed to the current name after the bluff in 1852), which was the site of an August 1804 council between the Lewis and Clark Expedition and members of the Oto and Missouria Native American tribes. William Clark recommended the high bluff overlooking the Missouri River to the United States government as a suitable location to build a fort.

== Council Bluff: frontier post ==
Fifteen years later, in 1819, President James Monroe dispatched a military expedition (the Yellowstone Expedition, led by Colonel Henry Atkinson) to establish a series of forts along the Missouri. These forts were to support the American fur trade and counteract British influence on the northern plains. The 6th US Infantry and 1st Rifle Regiments made up the military portion of the expedition, which arrived at the Council Bluff site on September 19. Their establishment of Fort Atkinson made it the first major American fort west of the Missouri River. It was located near Fort Lisa and Cabanne's Trading Post, private fur trading establishments operated by major traders who were based in St. Louis, Missouri.

The expedition stopped to build Cantonment Missouri, a winter camp along the river bottom below the bluffs. Abandoning plans to establish more forts upstream, the soldiers settled in for winter. The winter of 1819–20 was very harsh; a shortfall of government contractors left the garrison without sufficient supplies. The soldiers suffered widespread scurvy (due to poor nutrition and lack of vitamin C), which claimed the lives of over 200 of the 1,120 men that first winter. Estimates of the civilian deaths is possibly as high as double the military dead; no records were kept of their losses.

In the spring of 1820, the Missouri River flooded Cantonment Missouri. The soldiers built a permanent camp atop Council Bluff, and renamed it Fort Atkinson. The site was designated on US Federal Government maps as "Fort Calhoun" in honor of the Secretary of War, John C. Calhoun, however the US Army named the actual encampment after its first commander. During the 1820s, soldiers took meteorological observations as research for the government.

The garrison was involved in combat only in 1823. Members of the Arikara tribe attacked a trading party led by William H. Ashley along the Missouri River in present-day South Dakota. Soldiers from the fort retaliated by attacking the Arikara villages. Although no American soldiers died in the brief skirmish, seven soldiers drowned on the way upriver when their keelboat struck a log. They were counted as the first United States' casualties in the Indian Wars on the Great Plains.

In 1827, the Army abandoned the fort at Council Bluff and reassigned its personnel to other locations, primarily Fort Leavenworth.

== Re-activation of Fort Atkinson ==
When the Mormons established Cutler's Park in the North Omaha area in 1846, some of their food for the harsh winter was provided from old provisions they found at the fort. By the 1850s, when widespread European-American settlement began in the area, little remained of the fort.

In the 1950s, Nebraska State Historical Society archaeological crews determined the locations of buildings at the Fort Atkinson site. The Nebraska Game and Parks Commission gained title to the site in 1963. During the 1980s and 1990s, it reconstructed the fort. Today, Fort Atkinson is a Nebraska state historical park, which includes a military museum. It was designated a National Historic Landmark in 1961.

Living history demonstrations take place on the first weekend of each month from May to October. In addition to people demonstrating craft work and the duties of the Indian agent, military re-enactors interpret the activities of the Sixth Regiment of United States Infantry and First Regiment of United States Riflemen.

== See also ==
- Engineer Cantonment
- Fort Lisa
- Cabanne's Trading Post
- Winter Quarters
- Washington County Historical Association
- National Register of Historic Places listings in Washington County, Nebraska
