= Fort Lisa (Nebraska) =

Trading post

Coordinates: 41.361°N 95.939°W

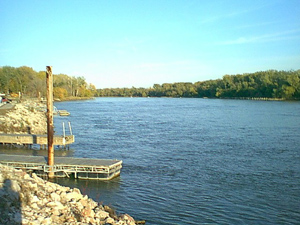
Fort Lisa would have sat on the Missouri River near this location in Dodge Park.

Fort Lisa (1812–1823) was established in 1812 in what is now North Omaha in Omaha, Nebraska by famed fur trader Manuel Lisa and the Missouri Fur Company, which was based in Saint Louis. The fort was associated with several firsts in Nebraska history: Lisa was the first European farmer in Nebraska; it was the first settlement by American citizens set up in the then-recent Louisiana Purchase; Lisa's wife (his third) was the first woman resident of European descent in Nebraska; and the first steamboat to navigate Nebraska waters, the Western Engineer, arrived at Fort Lisa in September 1819.

== History ==
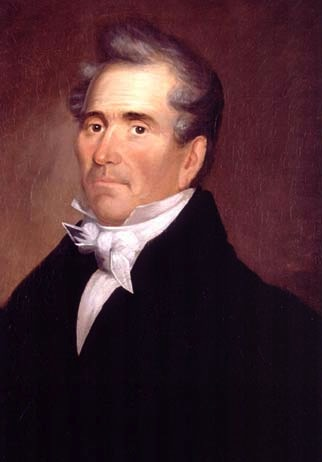
Manuel Lisa

Lisa established Fort Lisa on the Missouri River about 12 miles north of what became Omaha after abandoning his trading posts in the Upper Missouri River Valley, which were Fort Raymond/Manuel in Montana and the original Fort Lisa in North Dakota. The War of 1812 disrupted the fur trade with Native Americans for years.

Fort Lisa (Nebraska) was located, "at a point between five and six miles below the original Council Bluff – where Lewis and Clark had a council with the Missouri and Otoe Indians, August 3, 1804, and now the site of the town of Fort Calhoun..." A plaque memorializing Fort Lisa is located at 11808 John J. Pershing Drive in the northeast corner of Hummel Park, north of Florence, Nebraska, but the exact location of the fort is not known. Father De Smet, a historical figure after Lisa's time, identified the fort as being a mile north of Cabanne's Trading Post on the Ponca Creek.

The fort traded in furs, cattle, horses and land, and served as a base from which Manuel Lisa acted as a sub-agent to neighboring tribes for the federal government.

With his wide trading network, Manuel Lisa had a unique role in relation to American Indian tribes. He traveled extensively among them to share agricultural products and build relations, as well as to promote trade. According to one source, the influence of Manuel Lisa, exerted from Fort Lisa, was strong enough to hold all the Missouri River Indians firmly in alliance with the United States during the War of 1812. He organized war expeditions from Fort Lisa against tribes on the Mississippi River allied with the British. During the same period he secured the allegiance of tribes along the northern Missouri River.

In 1819 the first steamboat to ply the Missouri River, the Western Engineer, piloted by Stephen Harriman Long, arrived at the fort. Aboard the ship were General Henry Atkinson and Captain Stephen Watt Kearny, both important to the future development of the American West. Later forts in the Nebraska Territory were named after them: Fort Atkinson and Fort Kearny.

Lisa spent the winter of 1819-20 at Fort Lisa with his third wife, Mary Hempstead Keeney. That winter at the fort, they had the company of Major Stephen H. Long, whose famous expedition encamped a mile and a half north of Fort Lisa. In 1820 Lisa returned to St. Louis, where he died that year.

Major Joshua Pilcher next ran Fort Lisa and succeeded Lisa as president of the Missouri Fur Company. He closed Fort Lisa in 1823 after building Pilcher's Post downriver at what became Bellevue.

Fort Lisa likely influenced the positioning of several nearby historically significant sites. In competition, the American Fur Company established Cabanne's Trading Post two and one-half miles south in 1822. The proximity of the posts, along with Fort Atkinson, in turn influenced the positioning of Cutler's Park, the Mormon Bridge, Fort Omaha, and Florence. These establishments attracted the flow of Mormon Trail pioneers, which in turn led to the development of Kanesville, Omaha, Saratoga, and eventually all of North Omaha, as well as many further points in the western expansion of the United States.

== See also ==
- Cabanne's Trading Post
- Engineer Cantonment
- Fort Atkinson
- Winter Quarters
- History of North Omaha, Nebraska
- Landmarks in North Omaha, Nebraska
- Louisiana Purchase
- Nebraska Territory
- Timeline of North Omaha, Nebraska history
