= Martin Schubert =

Martin Schubert may refer to:

- Martin Schubert (academic), professor of medieval German
- Martin Schubert (Medal of Honor), United States Army officer and Medal of Honor recipient
