= James T. White (politician) =

American journalist, minister, and politician

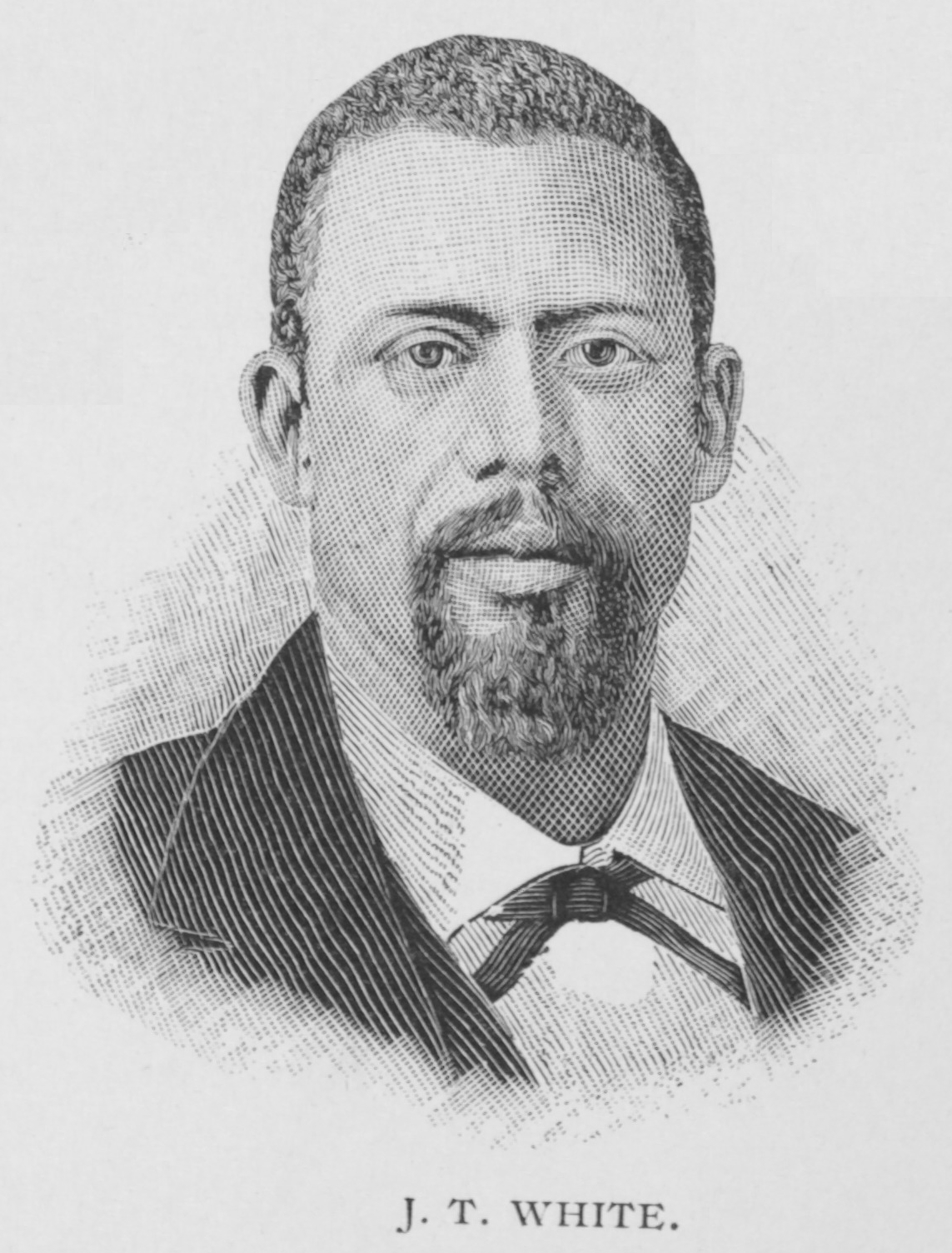
- White in 1887
- Born: August 25, 1837; New Providence, Indiana, U.S.
- Died: March 13, 1892 (aged 54); Helena, Arkansas, U.S.
- Occupations: Educator, minister, politician, journalist
- Political party: Republican

Religious life
- Religion: Baptist

James T. White (August 25, 1837 – March 13, 1892) was a Baptist minister and state legislator from Helena and Little Rock, Arkansas. He was a member of the Arkansas House of Representatives and later the Arkansas Senate in the late 1860s and early 1870s. He was also a member of the Arkansas constitutional conventions in 1868 and 1874. He edited the Baptist newspaper, The Arkansas Review. He was an African American and a Republican. In 1868 he was among the first six African Americans to serve in the Arkansas House.

== Early life ==
White was born in New Providence, Indiana, to James and Catharine White. The family moved to the capital city of Indianapolis in 1850. His parents had died by 1860. White joined the Baptist church at the age of 17 and became a minister at the age of 21.

In the spring of 1865, he was sent to the Consolidated American Baptist Convention held in St. Louis Missouri. In May of that year, more than 600 Baptist clergymen and a large number of lay delegates attended a number of concurrent conventions in that city. The largest such organization was the American Baptist Union. Other groups that met included the American Baptist Publication Society, the American Baptist Home Mission Society, and the American Baptist Education Society. While there, he was invited to Helena, Arkansas, where, on August 21, 1865, he became a pastor of the Second Baptist Church in Helena. White moved to Helena with a unit of African-American Union Army soldiers. The situation in Helena was uneasy. A part of the Confederacy, many Arkansas veterans resented the presence of newly freed slaves. White became pastor of a church that met in a government stable until Colonel Charles Bentzoni of the 56th United States Colored Infantry permitted them to move into the old Cumberland church, where services were held for two years until White was able to build a small house for services.

== Move to Arkansas and career ==
=== Political success ===
In 1867, White organized an Arkansas Missionary Baptist convention in the capital city of Little Rock. In 1868, White supported Reconstruction efforts and, in the fall of that year, he was elected to the state convention to frame a new constitution for Arkansas. He was one of eight black delegates at the convention, along with J. W. Mason, Richard Samuels, William Murphy, Monroe Hawkins, William Grey, Henry Rector, and Thomas P. Johnson. He was a strong advocate for black enfranchisement, and, after the convention, opposed the imposition of a poll tax that would restrict the ability of poor blacks to vote. He was then elected to the state House of Representatives serving the 11th district, which consisted of Phillips and Monroe counties. He served on the penitentiary committee, the committee on impeachment and removal from office, and the committee on miscellaneous provisions. He was reelected to the house twice, and then elected to the state Senate, where he served one term in 1871. He was then appointed to the position of commissioner of public works and internal improvements. In the 1868 and 1869 sessions, there were seven blacks in the Arkansas Legislature. In the 1871 session, there were eleven in the House and two, J. W. Mason and White, in the Senate. In 1872, white newspapers in Arkansas noted a split in the Phillips County black leadership between White and H. B. Robinson. In the 1873 session, there were 20 African Americans in the Arkansas legislature, four in the Senate and 16 in the House. James' brother, Rev. R. B. White represented Pulaski in the upper body of the general assembly. White was defeated in campaigns for legislature in 1873 and 1881.

During this time, he continued his work as a minister, and he succeeded in building two new churches, one in Helena and another in Little Rock. The church in Little Rock was destroyed by fire but rebuilt. He also organized the first Baptist District Association for Arkansas. In 1874, White was attacked by a group of Democrats and thrown into the Mississippi River, which ran beside Helena.

=== Political failures and later career ===
Early in 1874, Republican Governor Elisha Baxter moved to re-enfranchise former Confederate soldiers, a move that alienated many of his base. His opponent in the 1872 election, Joseph Brooks, was then declared governor by a county judge who declared that election to be fraudulent. Each side raised militias mostly of black men, who fought several bloody battles, known as the Brooks–Baxter War. Phillips County Republicans desired to raise men to fight for Brooks, and White made a largely successful effort to prevent Phillips County men from joining.

Later in 1874, White was elected to a second convention for the writing of a new state constitution. He then endeavored to raise money for a college, which was to be known as Helena University. This project failed, and White turned his effort to other work. The organization was led by Rev. George Priest of Jonestown, Mississippi, Rev. Moses Proffit of Phillips County, and White. Many elected and appointed positions in Phillips County were held by blacks from Reconstruction until about 1878. White played an important role in this, supporting an alliance between blacks (who were mostly Republican) and conservative white Democrats. Beyond White's legislative seats, blacks held positions as coroners and assessors, and H. B. Robinson served as county sheriff from 1874 to 1878, defeating White in an election for that position in October 1874. In 1876, White ran for the position of circuit court clerk and lost. He then ran for the position of chancery clerk, but lost.

In 1884, he began to work for the Benevolent and Church Aid Society and became editor of The Arkansas Review. In 1886, he was a delegate at the American National Baptist Convention led by William J. Simmons and Richard DeBaptiste. A major issue facing the group was unifying black Baptists for mutual support and to increase their "race confidence" as Solomon T. Clanton put it in a presentation of a paper he wrote. White's contribution included noted the importance of economic progress, how black Baptists were looked down upon in comparison to black Methodists, and especially the need for loyalty to the denomination. White was involved in Freemasonry. He was an active worker for education and helped organize public schools in Helena and in 1873 was a member of the Helena Public Schools' board of directors.

== Death ==
White resigned from the pastorate of the Second Baptist Church in Helena in March 1891. He died a year later of pneumonia in Helena, Arkansas.
