= Henry Atkinson (soldier) =

United States Army officer

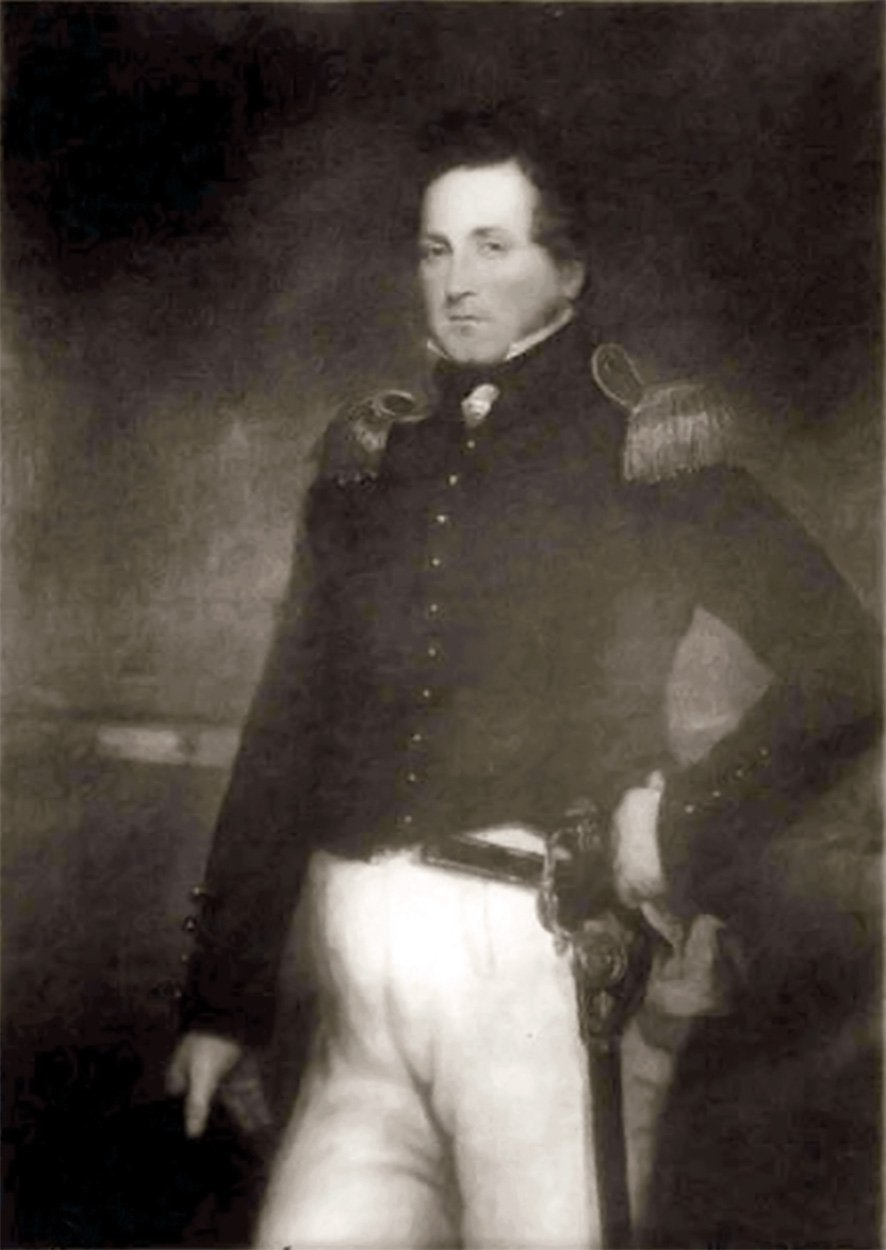
- Born: 1782; Person County, North Carolina
- Died: June 14, 1842 (aged 60); Jefferson Barracks, Missouri
- Burial place: Cave Hill Cemetery, Louisville, Kentucky
- Spouse: Mary Ann Bullitt (married 1826)
- Military career
- Allegiance: United States
- Branch: United States Army
- Service years: 1808–1842
- Rank: Brevet Brigadier General
- Conflicts: War of 1812

Henry Atkinson (1782 – June 14, 1842) was a United States Army officer serving on the western frontier during the War of 1812 and the Yellowstone expedition. With Benjamin O'Fallon, he negotiated treaties with Indigenous nations of the upper Missouri River in 1825. Over his career in the army, he served in the West, the Gulf Coast, and in New York at the border with The Canadas.

== Early life ==
Henry Atkinson was born in 1782 in Caswell County (now Person County, North Carolina). His mother died soon after the birth of her sixth child. His father, John Atkinson, married Francis Dickens shortly after his first wife's death and he had two more children with Francis.

In 1748 and 1749, John Atkinson received land grants from the colonial government. He was a local politician and a planter. During the American Revolutionary War, John was a member of the House of Commons and a delegate to the Hillsborough provincial congress in August 1775. He was also a member of the Hillsborough Committee of Safety during the war. He served twelve years as an Orange County Justice of the Peace beginning in 1776. He became North Carolina's tobacco purchasing agent in 1781. He had a total of 6,100 acres in the present Caswell and Person counties in 1785. John died in 1792, leaving an estate of seventeen slaves and 3,665 acres of land.

His brothers Edward and Richard were legislators and Edward served as county sheriff.

== Early career ==
Atkinson inherited a thousand acres in Caswell County when he was eighteen. He and nine other trustees obtained the charter for a local free school, Caswell Academy in 1802. He sat on the school's board of trustees, first as clerk and next as treasurer. He established a small store in 1804, but it failed the following year. He also worked on the family's plantation before July 1808.

He entered the United States Army on July 1, 1808, as a captain in the infantry, serving at various outposts on the Western frontier. He served in the New Orleans area. He moved to New York and was promoted to colonel in the Regular Army, seeing considerable action during the War of 1812. He commanded the 6th U.S. Infantry from 1815.

== Career after War of 1812 ==
After the war, Atkinson received orders in 1818 to lead the Yellowstone expedition along the Missouri River to the mouth of the Yellowstone River. The goal was to establish military forts to control Native Americans and allow American members of the fur trade to operate safely in the region. Colonel Talbot Chambers led the 1st Battalion of the Rifle Regiment left Belle Fontaine on August 30, 1818, up the Missouri River. On October 18 they arrived at Isle des Vaches, and spent the winter at Cantonment Martin. They left for Council Bluff where they met Major Stephen Harriman Long. Colonel Atkinson joined the military detachment and established their winter lodging, Cantonment Missouri. He led another expedition in 1825.

Appointed Commissioner together with Indian agent Benjamin O'Fallon and with a military escort of 476 men, General Atkinson and his fellow commissioner left Fort Atkinson on May 16, 1825, and ascending the Missouri, negotiated treaties of friendship and trade with tribes of the upper Missouri, including the Arikara, Cheyenne, Crow, Mandan, Ponca, and several bands of the Sioux.

The treaties acknowledged that the tribes lived within the United States, vowed perpetual friendship, and recognized the right of the United States to regulate trade, promising to deal only with licensed traders. The tribes agreed to forswear private retaliation for injuries and to return or indemnify the owner of stolen horses or other goods. Efforts to contact the Blackfoot and the Assiniboine were unsuccessful. Returning to Fort Atkinson at the "Council Bluff" in Nebraska, successful negotiations were had with the Otoe, the Pawnee and the Omaha.

He was appointed brevet brigadier general and was in overall command of U.S. forces during the Black Hawk War (1832). Although he delivered the final blow to the Black Hawk Indians at the Battle of Bad Axe, Atkinson was criticized for mishandling the operations of the war. Zachary Taylor and Henry Dodge, who served under him, were well-respected for their service during the war.

Atkinson organized the removal of the Winnebago to Iowa. A second Fort Atkinson was named in his honor in Iowa. The City of Fort Atkinson in Jefferson County, Wisconsin is also named after him. He initiated the construction of Fort Leavenworth and Jefferson Barracks (near St. Louis), where he spent the remainder of his career.

== Personal life ==
He married Mary Ann Bullitt on January 15, 1826, in the Christ Episcopal Church in Louisville, Kentucky. They had a son, Henry born in February 1827 and a son named Edward Graham Atkinson.

He died in his home on June 14, 1842. He was buried at Jefferson Barracks National Cemetery, Missouri. His body was later moved to Cave Hill Cemetery in Louisville, in the Bullitt-Gwathmey family lot.

== Locations named for Henry Atkinson ==
- Fort Atkinson, Iowa, a town in Iowa
- Fort Atkinson State Preserve, 1840s U.S. Army post in Fort Atkinson, Iowa
- Fort Atkinson (Nebraska), 1820s U.S. Army post in Nebraska
- Fort Atkinson, Wisconsin, a city and fort in Wisconsin

== Bibliography ==
- Nichols, Roger (1990). "Atkinson, Henry". American National Biography. New York: Oxford University Press. ISBN 978-0-19-520635-7.
