= J. T. Rodgers =

American politician

J. T. Rodgers was a member of the Arkansas House of Representatives in 1893. He was a white Democrat and served with two African Americans who also represented Jefferson County, Arkansas in the House that year, P. H. Booth and Howard McKay.
