= Peter H. Booth =

American politician

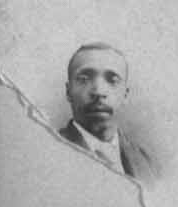
- Peter H. Booth in 1893

Member of the Arkansas House of Representatives
- In office January 9, 1893 – April 8, 1893
- Constituency: Jefferson County, Arkansas

Personal details
- Party: Republican
- Other political affiliations: Democratic-dominated government
- Occupation: Politician, Bootblack
- Known for: One of the few African-American members of the Arkansas House of Representatives in 1893

Peter H. Booth served as a member of the Arkansas House of Representatives in 1893, representing Jefferson County, Arkansas. A Republican, he was among the last African-Americans to serve in the Arkansas state legislature. Discriminatory election laws effectively ended Black political representation in the state for nearly eight decades afterwards.

== Background and historical context ==
Booth's election and service took place during the final years of meaningful Black political participation in post-Civil War Arkansas. Between 1868 and 1893, at least eighty-seven African American men were elected to and served in the Arkansas General Assembly, primarily from counties with large Black populations such as Jefferson County, whose seat is Pine Bluff. These legislators were drawn largely from the Black professional class, including lawyers, merchants, ministers, and educators.

The Democratic-controlled state government had already begun systematically dismantling Black political power before Booth's term. The 1891 Election Law removed local control of elections and introduced ballot printing reforms that disadvantaged illiterate voters, while an 1893 law required a poll tax receipt in order to vote. These measures suppressed Black voter turnout and effectively ended political participation for over a quarter of the state's population. No African American would be elected to the Arkansas General Assembly again until 1972.

== Legislative service ==
Booth served in the Arkansas House of Representatives from January 9 to April 8, 1893, as part of the Twenty-Ninth General Assembly of the State of Arkansas. He and the other legislators of the 1893 session were included in a composite photograph of the Twenty-Ninth General Assembly.

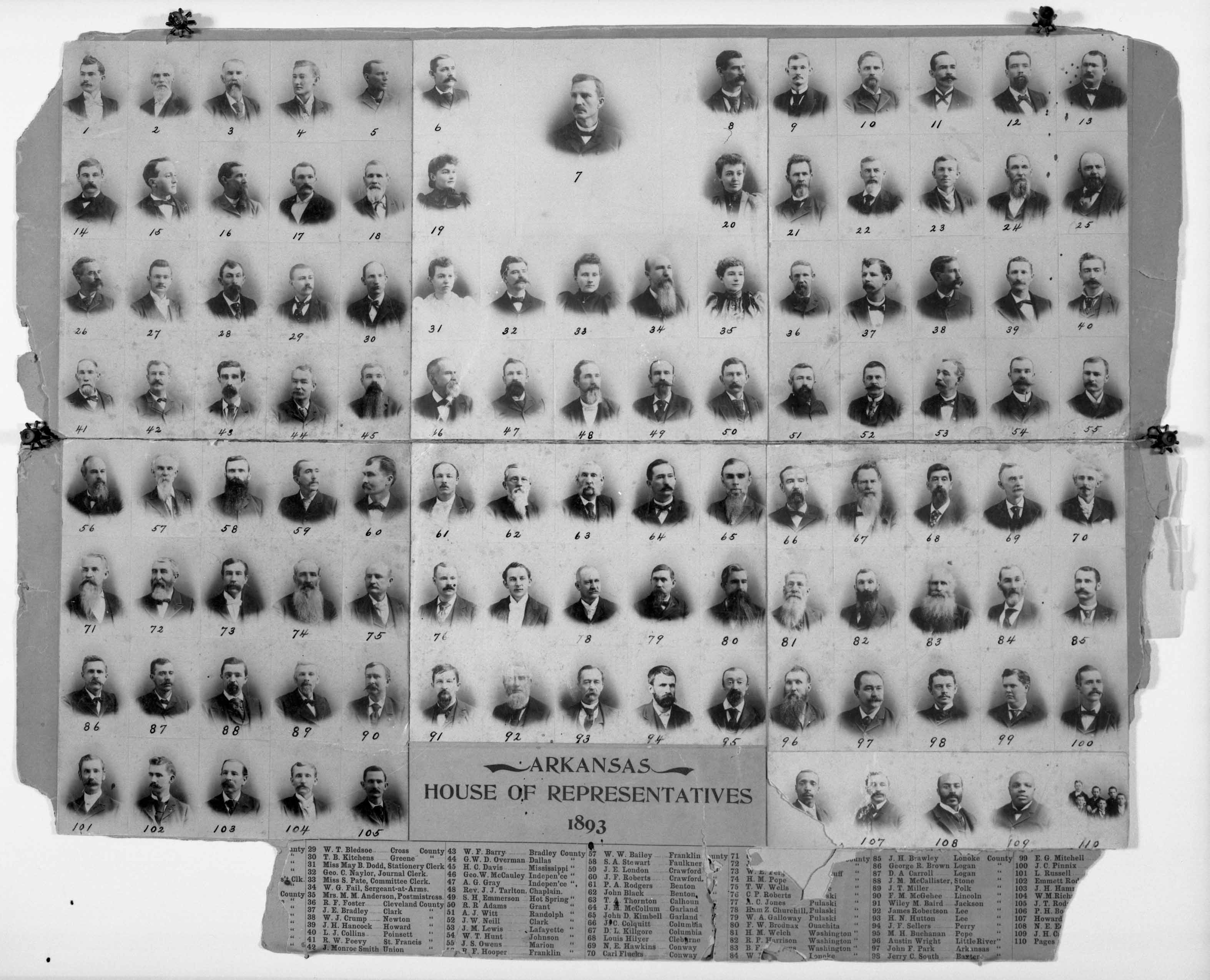
Members of the 1893 Arkansas House of Representatives (numbers 106 to 109 are the African Americans)

Booth was one of at least four African Americans serving in the Arkansas House of Representatives during the 1893 session. His fellow African-American colleague Howard McKay also represented Jefferson County in the House that year. John H. Carr and Nathan E. Edwards were the other African American representatives that year. George W. Bell served as an African-American member of the Arkansas State Senate concurrently. State government at the time was dominated by Democrats who were actively working to curtail Black political power.

During his brief term, Booth introduced legislation related to extending the time allowed for Australian ballot voting, a reform measure intended to assist voters, particularly those who were less literate, in casting their ballots without intimidation. However, the bill was tabled by white legislators and did not advance.

== Later life ==
By 1917, Booth was working as a bootblack shoe shine attendant for the Arkansas House of Representatives, serving in the same building where he had once sat as a member. A February 19, 1917, article in the Daily Arkansas Gazette reported on Booth's changed circumstances in a mocking tone, noting that no Black member had served in the House since the 1893 session. One contemporary newspaper remarked dismissively that "water had sought its level" in reference to Booth's transition from legislator to bootblack, reflecting the deeply racist attitudes prevalent in the Jim Crow era press.

== Legacy ==
Booth's service represents a significant chapter in Arkansas history. He was among the last of at least eighty-seven African American men who served in the Arkansas General Assembly between 1868 and 1893 a generation of Black lawmakers whose political careers were systematically ended by discriminatory legislation, including the adoption of the Australian ballot. The 1893 session in which Booth served was the last to include African-American members for nearly eighty years, until the modern Civil Rights movement led to renewed Black electoral participation in Arkansas.

Booth is listed among the documented African American officeholders from the end of the Civil War until before 1900 in Arkansas historical records.
