= George Shell =

George Shell may refer to:

- George C. Shell, Lawyer and Arkansas State Senator
- George R. E. Shell (1908–1996), United States Marine Corps general
- George W. Shell (1831–1899), U.S. Representative from South Carolina
