= Southlands College =

Southlands College may refer to:

- Southlands College, Galle, a girls' school in Sri Lanka
- Southlands College, Roehampton, one of the four constituent colleges of the University of Roehampton, London, England

== See also ==
- Southland College
- Southland College (Arkansas)
- Northern Southland College
