= Fort Atkinson State Preserve =

1840s U.S. Army post, in Iowa, US

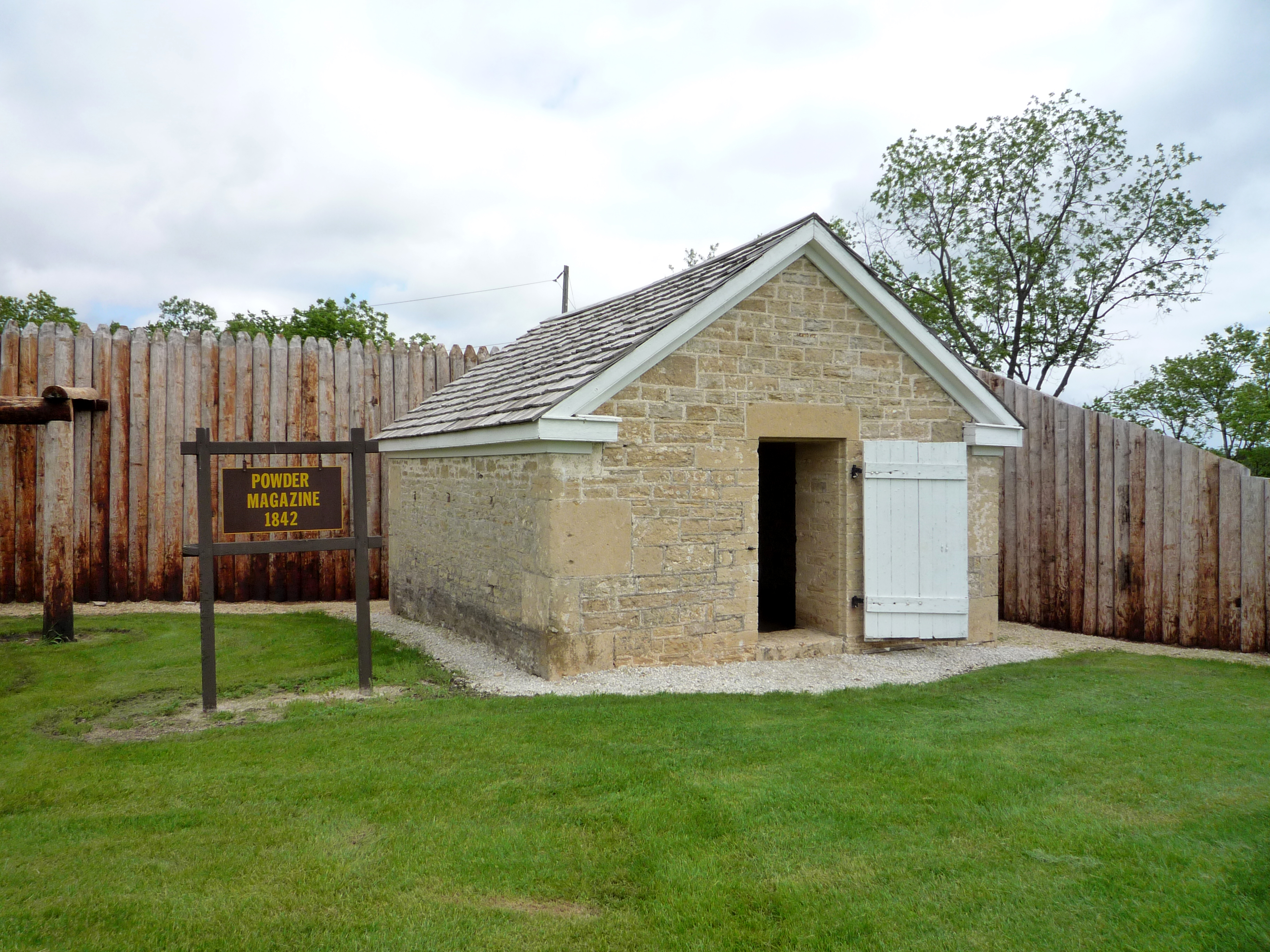
- Fort Atkinson's powder magazine

- Location within Iowa Location within the United States
- Location: Winneshiek County, Iowa, United States
- Coordinates: 43°08′44″N 91°56′21″W
- Area: 5 acres (2.0 ha)
- Elevation: 1,096 ft (334 m)
- Established: 1921 (state acquisition); 1968 (dedication)
- Administrator: Iowa Department of Natural Resources
- Website: Official website
- Fort Atkinson Historic District
- U.S. National Register of Historic Places
- U.S. Historic district
- NRHP reference No.: 13000036
- Added to NRHP: February 27, 2013

Fort Atkinson State Preserve is a state preserve of Winneshiek County, Iowa, United States, containing the remnants of Fort Atkinson, a U.S. Army frontier post created to keep the peace between various Native American tribes as well as prevent white settlers from encroaching on Native lands. In February 2013 the fort was listed on the National Register of Historic Places as Fort Atkinson Historic District.

== History ==
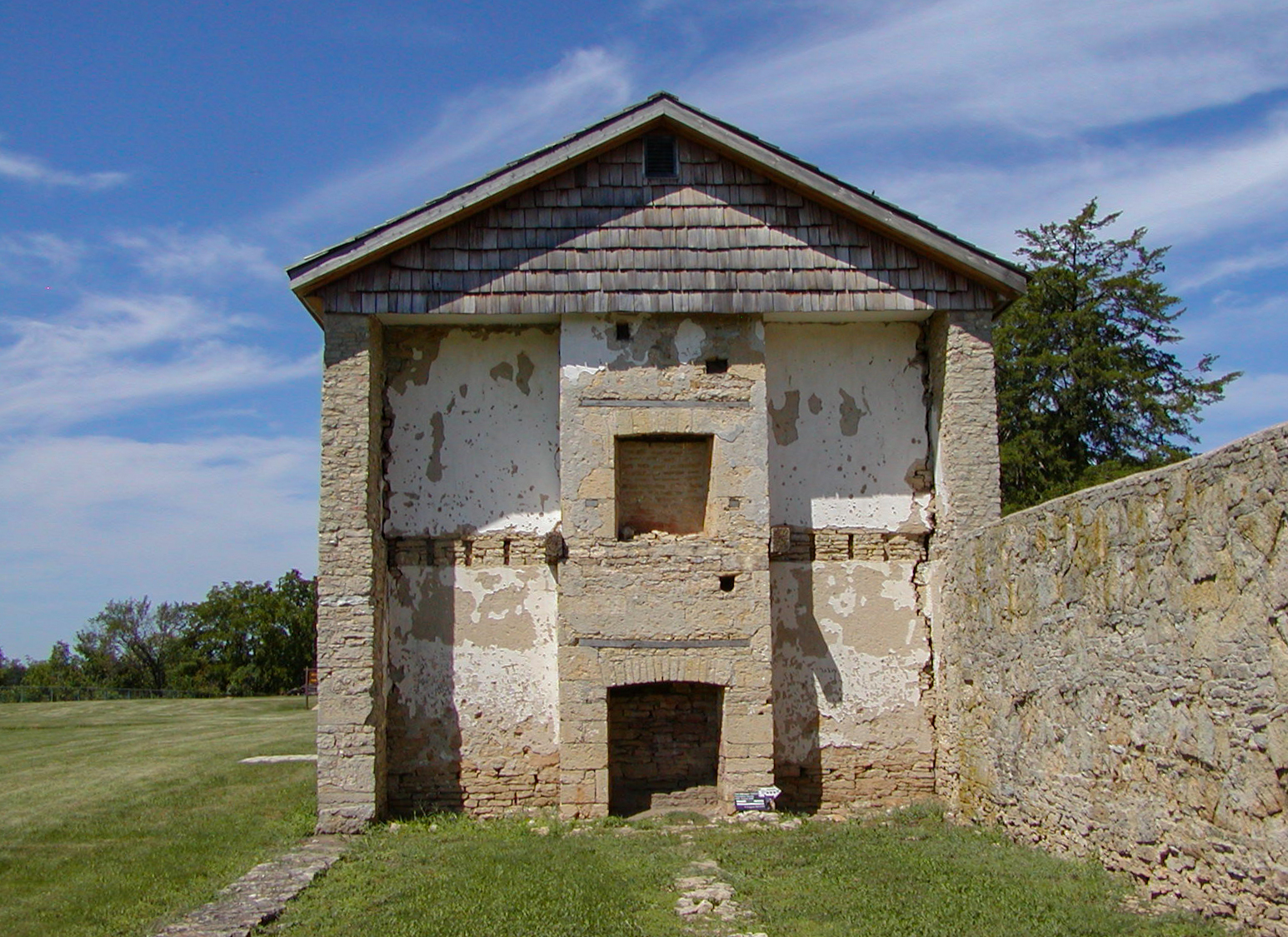
Remains of north barracks, showing exposed interior fireplaces

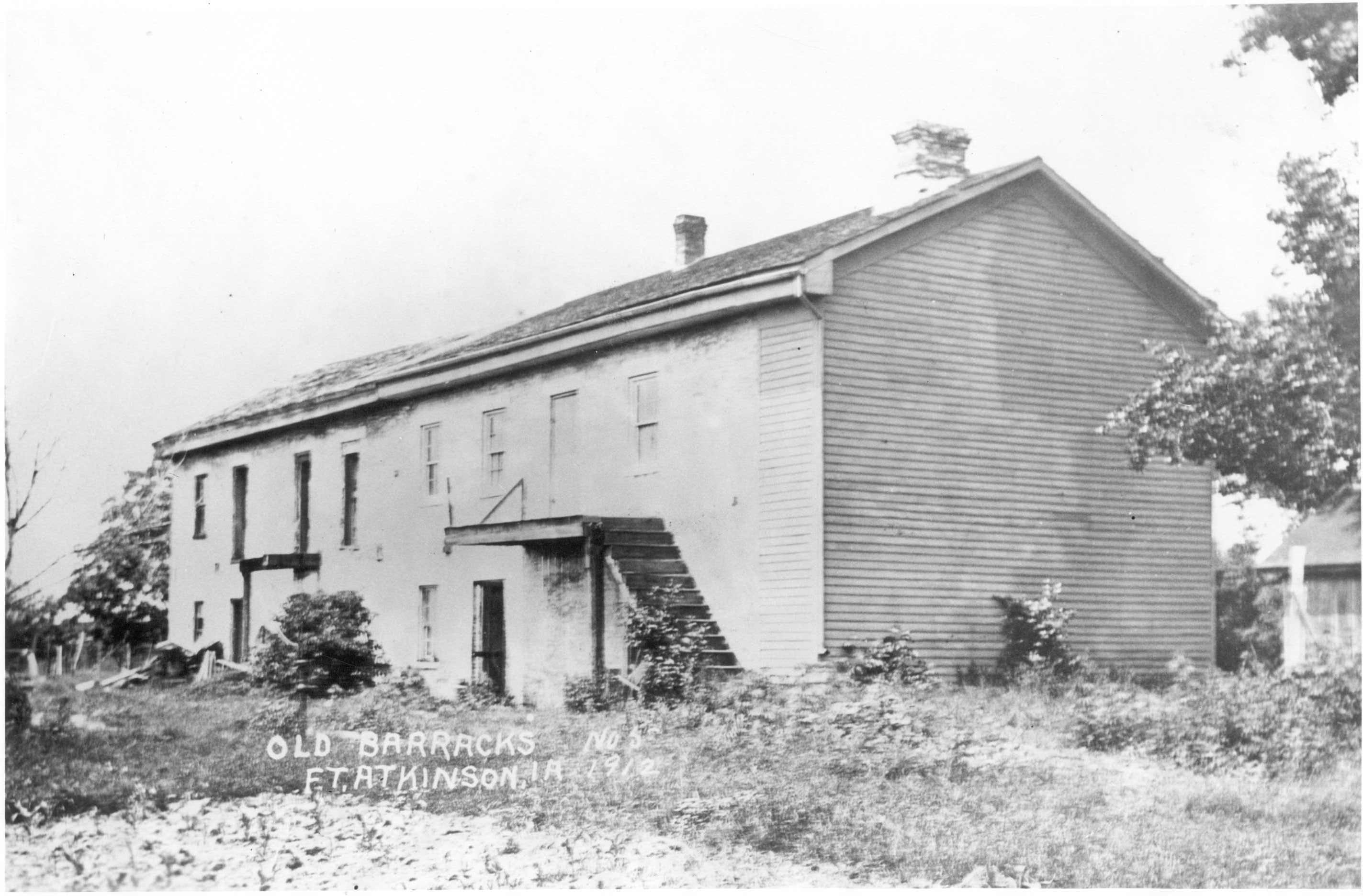
Fort Atkinson north barracks in 1912, after abandonment

The 1830 Treaty of Prairie du Chien, negotiated between the United States and various tribes, established the Neutral Ground: the tribes agreed to land cession of a 40-mile-wide (64 km) strip of land, two strips of land 20 miles (32 km) wide each on either side of the boundary roughly from present-day La Crosse, Wisconsin and Prairie du Chien, Wisconsin, extending from the Mississippi River to the Des Moines River in what today is southeastern Minnesota and northeastern Iowa. Originally planned as a buffer zone between the Sac and Fox Nation and Sioux Nation, the land was soon designated for the Ho-Chunk (or Winnebago) tribe after their removal from Wisconsin. Fort Atkinson was founded to keep the Ho-Chunk on the Neutral Ground, and to protect them from other tribes as well as prevent white traders and settlers from intruding on Indian land. The post was also reinforced the authority of the U.S. government official who operated a school, model farm and provided supplies to the Ho-Chunk.

A camp was founded on the site on May 31, 1840 by Cpt. Lynde commanding Co. F, 5th US Infantry and named after Henry Atkinson, the commanding officer in charge of the Ho-Chunk resettlement. The fort took three years to construct and was completed by the end of summer of 1842. Company B, 1st US Dragoons arrived on June 24, 1840, remaining until June 20, 1846. Co. F, 5th US Infantry was replaced on Sept 10, 1841 by Co. K, 1st US Infantry, which recently arrived from Florida. Co. I, 1st US Dragoons under Captain James Allen was additionally posted at Ft. Atkinson from August to November 1842, the three companies marked the largest garrison at the post during its history with 196 soldiers in the garrison in August 1842. Co. A & B, 1st US Infantry were each briefly at the post in the spring and summer of 1843. Co. E, 1st US Infantry, replaced Co. K on May 19, 1844. The infantry left the post on Sept 9, 1845. After Co. B, 1st US Dragoons left in June 1846, to report to Ft. Leavenworth in response to the Mexican–American War, the post was briefly vacant. Morgan's Iowa Company of Volunteer Infantry began staffing the fort on July 15, 1846. Parker's Iowa Company of Mounted Volunteers arrived in September 1846, but was disbanded as being too expensive in November 1846. Morgan's Company was reorganized as a mounted unit in July 1847 and helped moved the Ho-Chuck from Iowa to Minnesota in June 1848. The last of the militia left on September 11, 1848. The fort was again briefly vacant until Co. C, 6th US Infantry under Captain T L Alexander reached the post from Mexico on Sept. 28, 1848. The fort was abandoned by the 6th US Infantry on February 24, 1849.

The fort was sold at public auction in 1855. The private owners had the land surveyed and platted for the town of Fort Atkinson. In 1906, a geologic study of Winneshiek County named the stone used in the fort as the Fort Atkinson Limestone Member of the Maquoketa Group, having originated from a shallow tropical sea 440 million years ago. The state of Iowa acquired the fort in 1921 and reconstruction started in 1958. In 1968, the fort was dedicated as part of the State Preserves System because of its geological, archaeological and historical value.

== Design ==
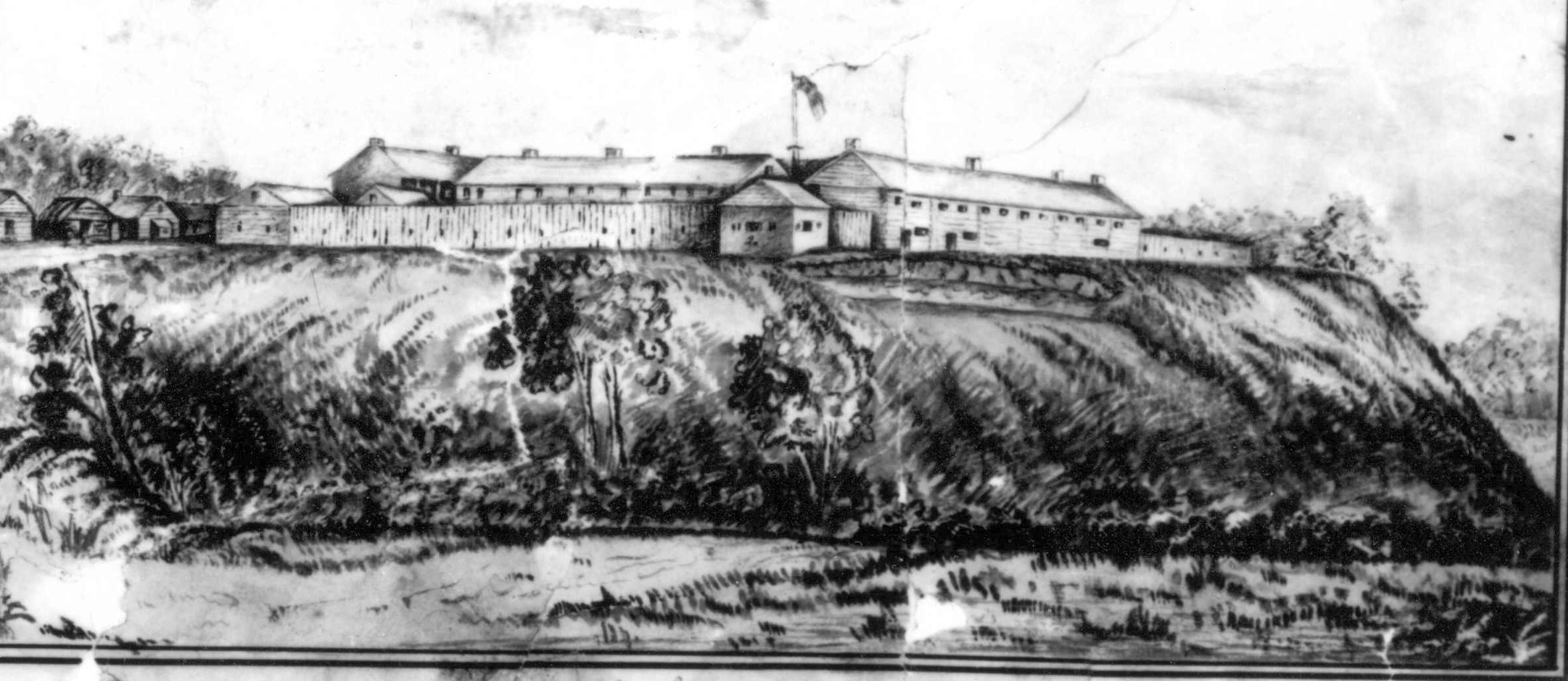
1842 sketch of Fort Atkinson

The fort included 24 buildings and an 11'9" stockade, outside of which were 14 additional buildings. The design was typical of frontier posts, using a rectangular layout enclosed by a wooden picket-stockade. A parade ground was at the center, surrounded by four main barracks. Cannon houses sat at the northeast and southwest corners, a gunpowder magazine in the southeast corner and a commissary in the northwest. Buildings outside the fort included the granary, bakery, blacksmith and stables. The buildings were constructed out of limestone quarried nearby or hewn logs with cut-pine shingle roofs.
