= 1st Iowa Infantry Regiment (African Descent) =

1st Iowa Infantry Regiment Colored
- Iowa flag
- Active: October 11, 1863, to March 11, 1864
- Country: United States
- Allegiance: United States of America; Union
- Branch: Infantry

The 1st Iowa Infantry Regiment Colored was an African-American infantry regiment that served in the Union Army during the American Civil War.

== Service ==
The first six companies of the 1st Iowa Infantry Colored was organized at Keokuk, Iowa and mustered into Federal forces on October 11, 1863 and Four additional companies were added before the end of the year. The regiment spent its only assignment of post and garrison duty at Helena, Arkansas, while being attached to the District of Eastern Kansas, VII Corps of the Department of Arkansas before they were redesignated in March, 1864.

on March 11, 1864 was redesignated the 60th United States Colored Infantry Regiment.

== Total strength and casualties ==
A total of 1153 men served in the 1st Iowa Colored during its existence. It suffered 12 combat fatalities,1 officer and 11 enlisted men, who were killed in action or who died of their wounds. The unit also suffered the loss of 332 enlisted men who died of disease, for a total of 344 fatalities.

== Commanders ==
- Colonel John G. Hudson

== See also ==
- List of Iowa Civil War Units
- Iowa in the American Civil War
