= History of slavery in Iowa =

Slavery occurred in Iowa prior to 1846, but the extent and significance of slavery in pre-state Iowa is poorly understood. Little is known about slavery in Iowa prior to the Louisiana Purchase. The area that is now the American state of Iowa was part of New France when first settled by Europeans. As such, it was governed by its slavery laws. French settlers first brought African slaves into Upper Louisiana from Saint-Domingue around 1720 under the legal terms of the Code Noir, which defined the conditions of slavery in the French empire and restricted the activities of free Black persons.

In the pre-state Iowa Territory, there are sporadic accounts of slaves in Iowa. In its first decision, In Re the Matter of Ralph, decided July, 1839, the Iowa Territorial Supreme Court determined that "no man in this territory can be reduced to slavery" and a fugitive former slave living in Dubuque could not be forcibly returned to Missouri. However this decision against slavery was difficult to enforce. In the 1840 United States census 16 enslaved people were recorded in Iowa Territory, all living in Dubuque County. The only recorded slave sale occurred in 1841, when O. H. W. Stull, the Iowa territorial secretary, purchased an enslaved boy in Iowa City. Josiah Smart, a U.S. Government Indian Agent, owned two slaves while working at Fort Des Moines before 1845.

Slavery was outlawed in Iowa when it obtained statehood in 1846; Section 23 of the Bill of Rights in the Constitution of the State of Iowa expressly prohibited slavery. In the years leading up to the Civil War, many Iowans became involved in the Underground Railroad, and famed abolitionist John Brown used Iowa as a base for his anti-slavery campaigns, 1856–1859. The state of Iowa played a significant role during the American Civil War in providing food, supplies, troops and officers for the Union army.

== See also ==
- Slavery in New France
- Slavery in the United States
- History of Iowa
