= O'Fallons Bluff =

- U.S. National Register of Historic Places
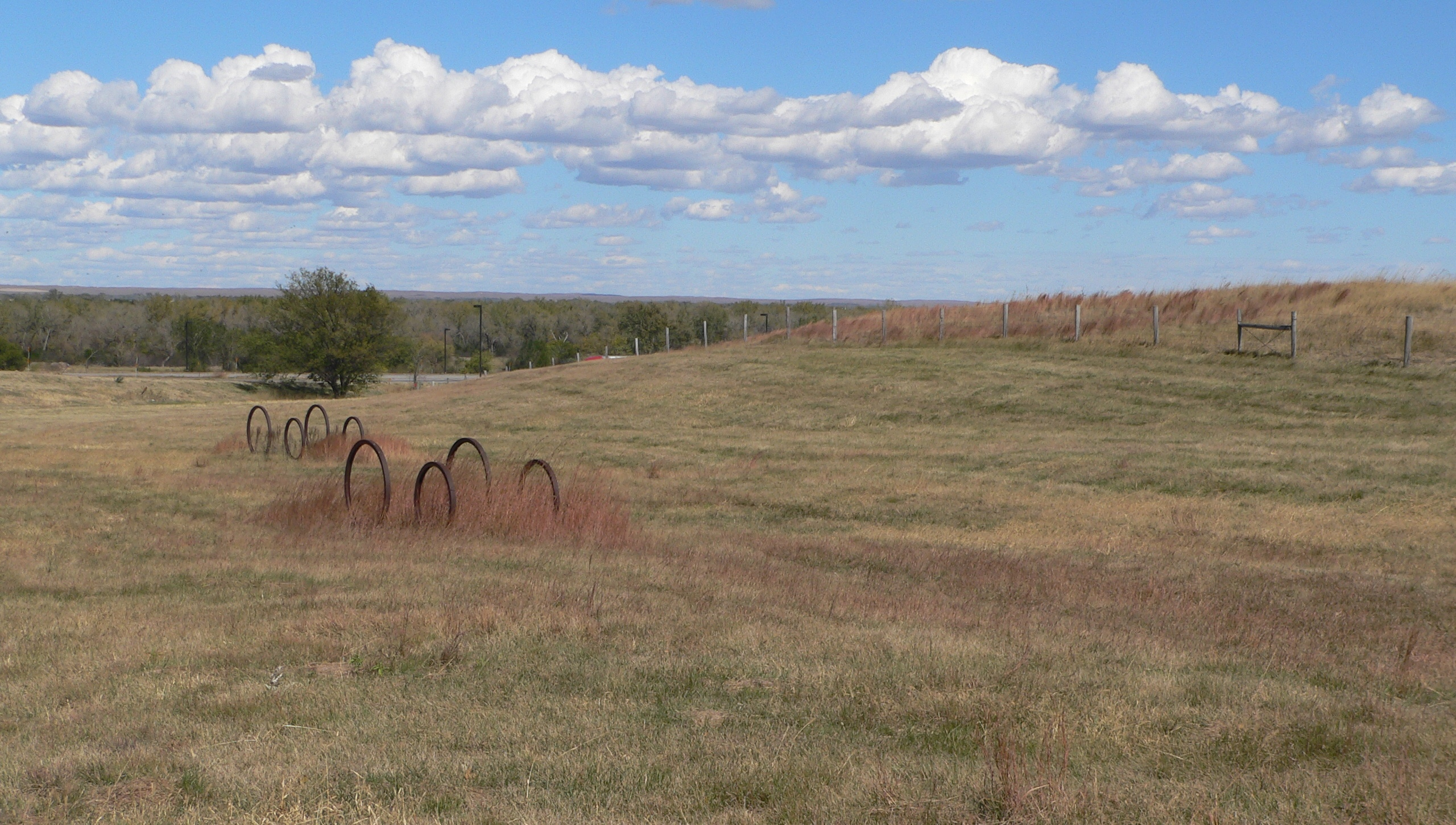
- O'Fallons Bluff

- Location within Nebraska Location within the United States
- Location: Near Sutherland, Lincoln County, Nebraska
- Coordinates: 41°08′11″N 101°05′41″W
- Built: 1846 to 1867
- NRHP reference No.: 74001127
- Added to NRHP: July 24, 1974

O'Fallons Bluff is a section of bluffs about 20 miles (32 km) long that run along the south side of the Platte River near Sutherland in Lincoln County, Nebraska. The Oregon and California trails ran up and over these bluffs. They were characterized by American pioneers heading west to Oregon and California as sparse in vegetation with a number of violent incidents involving Native Americans. In the early 1860s, a Pony Express station was located about 5 miles (8 km) west of where the wagon trails went up the bluff. During construction of Interstate 80, the steep part of the bluffs were cut away but wagon ruts remained, which are marked by iron hoops signifying wagon wheels. It was listed in the National Register of Historic Places in 1974.

== History ==
There is relatively little recorded on O'Fallons Bluff other than diary entries by American pioneers heading west to Oregon and California. The bluffs were close to the Platte River and, due to the terrain, the Oregon and California trails ran up and over the bluffs. Most sources indicate that the bluffs were named after Indian agent Benjamin O'Fallon, but the origin of the name may be unclear.

The area around the bluffs were described as an "alkali belt" and alkali was found in both the water near O'Fallons Bluff as well as the soil rendering much of the area near the bluffs devoid of vegetation. On June 13, 1881, Emily Towell wrote in her diary that "There were few flowers to be seen, only withered poppies, prickly pears and sunflowers. Now and then we glimpsed a few spears of green grass."

Although there are few detailed accounts, O'Fallons Bluff was known for incidents between Native Americans and non-Native Americans who traveled there. For example, Thomas Twiss (an agent for the Upper Platte Indian Agency) reported that Almon W. Babbitt and two companions were killed by 13 Cheyenne Native Americans at O'Fallons Bluff in 1856. Eugene Ware, a junior officer in the 7th Iowa Cavalry in 1863, wrote about several incidents involving Native American attacks in the area.

On June 18, 1846 the Donner Party passed by O'Fallons Bluff on their journey along the Oregon Trail to California.

In 1859, the Central Overland California and Pikes Peak Express Company used O'Fallons Bluff station as a Pony Express station. The station was located around 2 miles (3.2 km) south and 4 miles (6.4 km) west of Sutherland, Nebraska and 5 miles (8 km) west of where the Oregon and California Trails climbed up the bluffs.

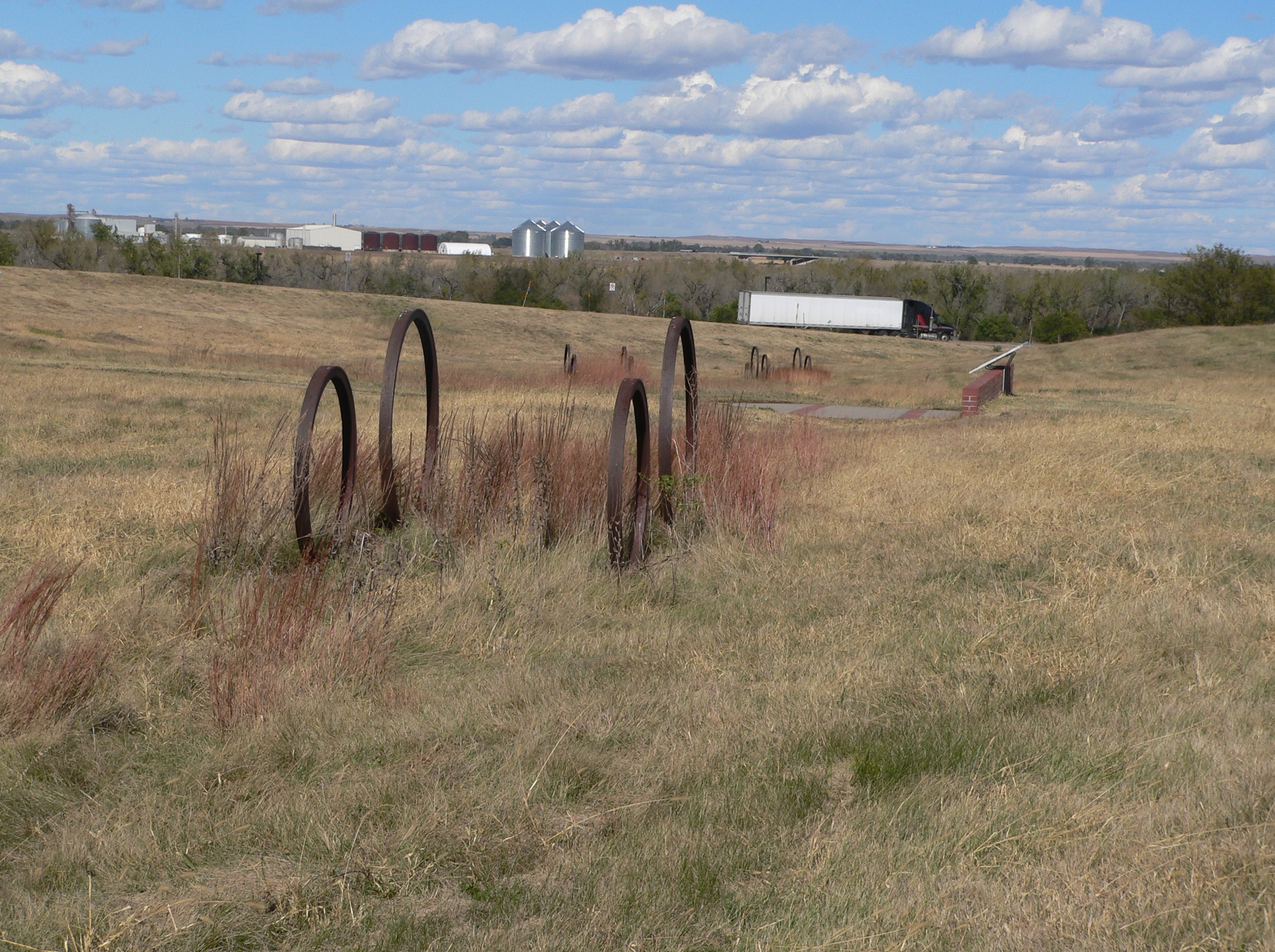
View from O'Fallons Bluff facing northeast. The iron hoops mark the location of ruts left by wagons crossing the bluffs. When Interstate 80 was built, it cut through the bluffs and ran close to the wagon trails as seen by the trail ruts running downhill toward a semi-trailer truck that is parked along Interstate 80.

== After construction of Interstate 80 ==
Much of O'Fallons Bluff was removed when Interstate 80 was constructed, though remnants of wagon-wheel ruts from the Oregon and California trails still remain. These trail ruts parallel to Interstate 80 ranging from only a few feet (or meters) to about a mile (a little over a kilometer) from it. The remaining ruts that run up and over O'Fallon's Bluff are marked by iron hoops representing wagon wheels and can be seen close to Interstate 80.

In 1864, Eugene Ware reported that General Robert Byington Mitchell stopped on O'Fallons Bluff, had it fortified, and ordered a company of cavalry to guard it. In 1966, archaeologists excavated a rectangular portion of a ditch at the base of O'Fallons Bluff that was thought to be the remnants of the fortifications erected in 1864. However, after excavating over 50 metres (160 ft) of trenches, only scattered animal bones were found.
