= Benjamin O'Fallon =

American Indian agent

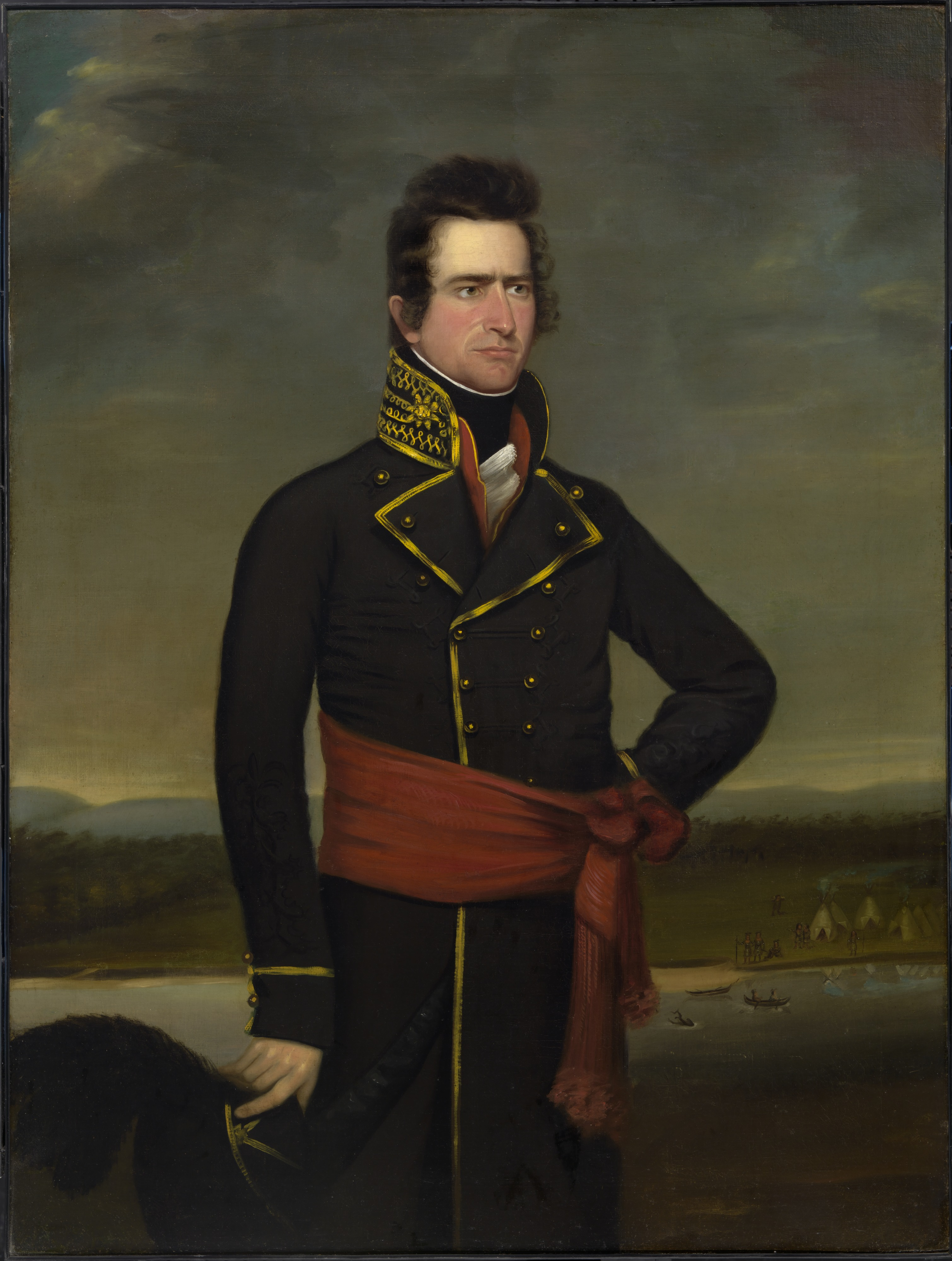
- Benjamin O'Fallon, ca. 1833, National Portrait Gallery, Smithsonian Institution
- Born: September 20, 1793
- Died: December 17, 1842 (aged 49)
- Occupation: Indian agent
- Years active: 1813–1842
- Spouse: Sophie Lee
- Relatives: John O'Fallon (brother); William Clark (uncle and guardian); George Rogers Clark (uncle)

Benjamin O'Fallon (1793–1842) was an Indian agent along the upper areas of the Mississippi and Missouri Rivers. He interacted with Native Americans as a trader and Indian agent. He was against British trappers and traders operating in the United States and territories. He believed that the military should have taken a strong stance against the British and firm in negotiations with Native Americans. Despite his brash manner and contention with the military, he was able to negotiate treaties between native and white Americans. In his early and later careers, he built gristmills, was a retailer, and a planter. He collected Native American artifacts and paintings of tribe members by George Catlin. His uncle William Clark was his guardian and financial backer.

== Early life ==
Benjamin O'Fallon was born on September 20, 1793, in Lexington, Kentucky. His parents were James O'Fallon, an Irish immigrant, and Frances "Fanny" Clark O'Fallon, the sister of William and George Rogers Clark. James came to the American colonies in 1774 from Ireland. During the American Revolutionary War, he served in George Washington's army as a surgeon. After the war, he was a general agent for the South Carolina Yazoo Land Company in 1789. He sought business schemes in St. Louis with adventurers, French agents, and Spanish officials, like Edmond-Charles Genêt (Citizen Genêt), George Rogers Clark and General James Wilkinson.

In 1791, he married Frances Eleanor Clark (1773–1825) in Kentucky, with whom they had two sons John and Benjamin. James died a few months after Benjamin's birth. By that time, the couple had separated. Frances married for a second time to Captain Charles Mynn Thruston in 1796, with whom they had two sons, Charles and William. Thruston died and in 1805 she married Judge Dennis Fitzhugh.

William and George Clark became involved in the O'Fallon and Thruston boys' lives after the death of Captain Thruston. William was their guardian in 1808 and a year later William brought Benjamin and John to St. Louis, where he was an Indian agent. At some point, the four boys lived at Mulberry Hill and then Clark's Point, in Louisville, Kentucky. The Clarks were slave-owners. Beginning in his childhood, O'Fallon had chronic health problems of his bowels, spleen, and liver. He was ill-mannered.

Fanny lived in Louisville, Kentucky until April 1825. She came to St. Louis to be under the care of Dr. Bernard G. Farrar, her son-in-law. She died on June 19, 1825, and was buried at the Bellefontaine Cemetery in St. Louis.

== Early career ==
He established a business selling meat and flour in 1813 with James Kennerly, who was the brother of William Clark's second wife and cousin of his first wife. A year later, O'Fallon supplied Clark's military expedition to Prairie du Chien in present Wisconsin. He built gristmills and sawmills north of St. Louis in 1815, but sold the mills after one year.

== Trader and Indian agent ==
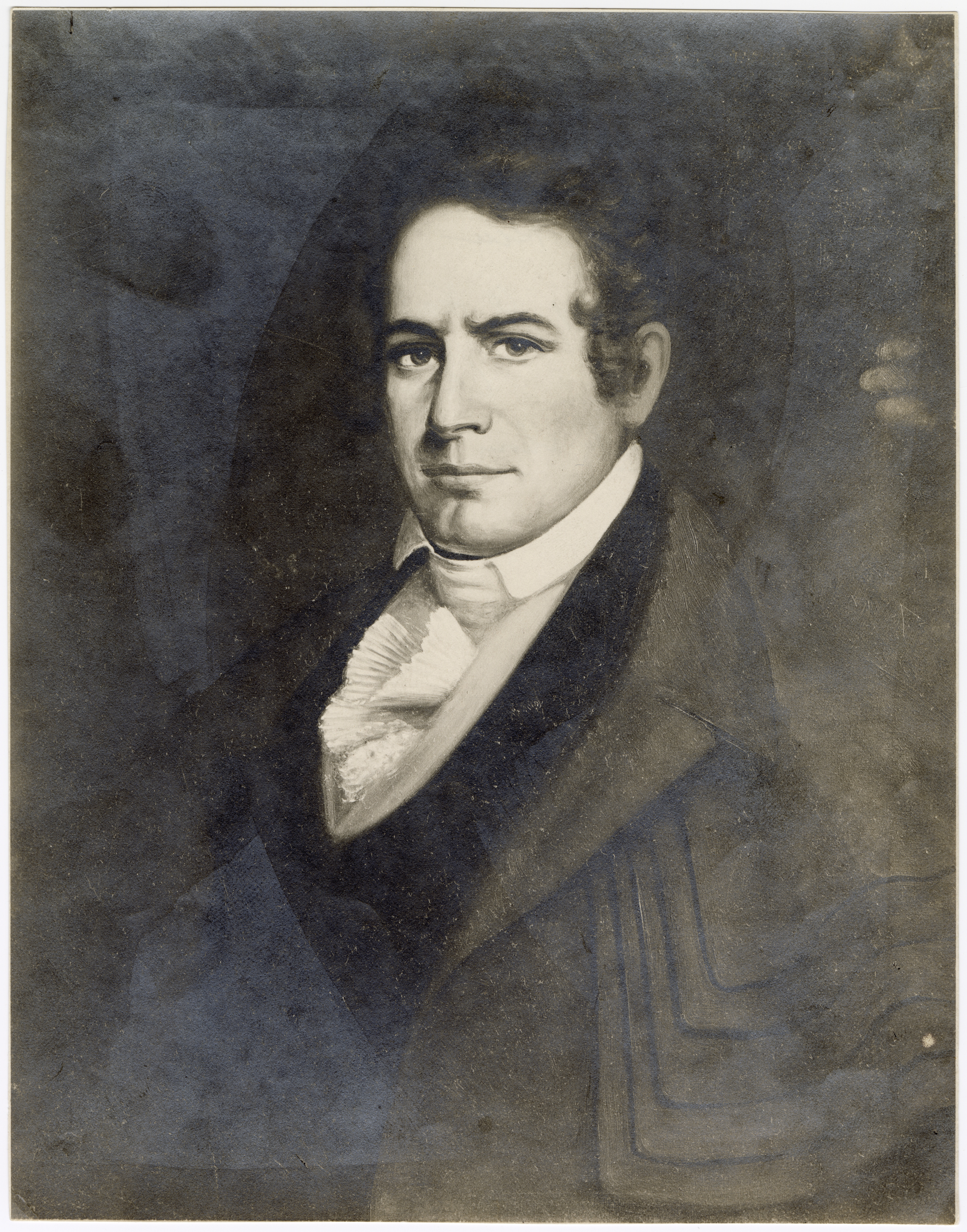
Painting of O'Fallon by A.D.M. Cooper

O'Fallon was a partner of the Missouri Fur Company. In 1816, O'Fallon became a trader and special agent for the Sioux and other tribes on the upper Mississippi River. In 1818, he was appointed as a subagent for the upper Missouri River. At Prairie du Chien, O'Fallon kept track of British traders and their relationships with Native Americans. O’Fallon said, "It will be a vain struggle to attempt the change of the treacherous savage, so long as un-principled British Traders are permitted to trade within our Territory."

In 1818, O'Fallon took British trader Robert Dickson in custody, put him in shackles, and took him to St. Louis. O'Fallon declared that he was trading illegally on American territory and considered him the most treacherous of the British traders for provoking Native Americans against Americans. At St. Louis, he turned him over to his uncle William Clark (then the governor of Missouri Territory), who released Dickson and had him returned to Canada.

In 1819, O'Fallon became an Indian agent, headquartered in Council Bluffs. He was assigned to the Yellowstone expedition, led by General Henry Atkinson and Stephen Harriman Long. O'Fallon and his deputy and interpreter John Doughtery visited tribes prior to the expedition, informing them of the upcoming visits of friendly and peaceful scientists and troops. They did this to prevent difficulties with any of the Native Americans that would be visited during the expedition. O'Fallon asked that the explorers be treated with kindness. At the time, O'Fallon was an Indian agent for the Otoe, Omaha, Pawnee, and Missouria tribes.

Atkinson and O'Fallon had differences of opinion over Native American policy and the degree to which a military commander held dominion over the Indian agent. O'Fallon believed that British fur traders who crossed into American territory and Native Americans should be dealt with firmly and with a show of force. He was an advocate for American trader's rights and was against government-run trading posts. He acquired the honorary title of Major for his position as an Indian agent.

He held councils with the Pawnee, Omaha, Otoe, Missouria, Kansa, and Iowa people in 1819 and 1820. He took a number of Native American chiefs to Washington, D.C., by 1822. By this time, white men had entered the frontier to trap and hunt beavers. It was initially a difficult job to catch and kill them, but a steel-cage trap was invented in 1823 that greatly simplified the process. About the same time, there was a demand for beaver fur hats in the eastern United States and Europe. William Henry Ashley advertised for 100 men to join his firm to trap for beaver along the Missouri River. It had been illegal for white men to enter Native American lands, other traders obtained fur pelts from natives. Ashley and his partner Andrew Henry intended to directly trap for furs, without going through local tribes. O'Fallon saw this as an outrageous plan that would undercut white traders and disturb the peaceful and collaborative commerce with local tribes. His uncle William and brother John supported and benefited from the lucrative beaver trapping business. Clark encouraged Henry and Ashley to develop relationships with the tribes along the Missouri. Among those who signed on to trap furs were Thomas Fitzpatrick, Jim Bridger, and Jedediah Smith. While Ashley traded with the Arikara leaders for horses, some of his men entered the Arikara village in search of women. A fight broke out that led to a dawn attack on Ashley's group of 90 trappers by 600 natives called the Arikara War. Fifteen of Ashley's men died. Forty three injured men made their way to Fort Atkinson, where O'Fallon chastised the men for leaving Ashley's party to the Arikara. The 6th Infantry Regiment rode out on June 22 to avenge the attack, which O'Fallon believed was instigated by the British.

President James Monroe signed a bill on May 25, 1824, that created the Bureau of Indian Affairs and provided the funds for a peace commission to travel up the Missouri River, at the cost of $10,000 (equivalent to $293,182 in 2025). O'Fallon and Atkinson were assigned as commissioners. O'Fallon was in poor health in 1824, but he joined the second expedition from Council Bluffs to the mouth of the Yellowstone. They met with tribes, some of whom met representatives from the United States government for the first time. Peter Wilson, an Indian agent of the western Sioux and Teton tribes, sent runners ahead of council meeting to prepare tribes for the upcoming visit. The objective was to shift reliance on British traders to American fur traders, but Atkinson and O'Fallon had different viewpoints on how to meet the goal.

Each treaty-signing ended with an awe-inspiring military parade, the firing of cannons, and the distribution of whiskey… The only rancorous notes came from Benjamin O’Fallon, who continued to inveigh against the 'Continued robbing and butchering of our people by the Indians' and the 'dark designing sycophants' who protect them.

During a council with Crow chiefs, O'Fallon hit two of the leaders over the head with a musket. Atkinson and O'Fallon got into screaming arguments, one time during a meal they brandished their cutlery at each other. George Kennerly stepped in to prevent an attack, and he later stated that he was embarrassed that O'Fallon was the "nephew of the man whom I look up to as a father." Although the men had their differences, their expedition was a success. They negotiated treaties with 15 tribes, they had not found any British traders on the Missouri, and not one man had died. During the expedition, O'Fallon became seriously ill and returned to St. Louis. He resigned his position as an Indian agent in December 1826, with John Doughtery replacing him in 1827.

== Businessman ==
Benjamin O'Fallon moved to the Sulphur Springs area where he established the Indian Retreat Plantation in 1834. He built gristmills, operated a small plantation, and sought other sources of income, but he did not become wealthy like his brother John O'Fallon. He continued to support American fur interests and supported Andrew Jackson's political career; They had become friends during O'Fallon's 1819 trip to Washington, D.C.

== Collector ==
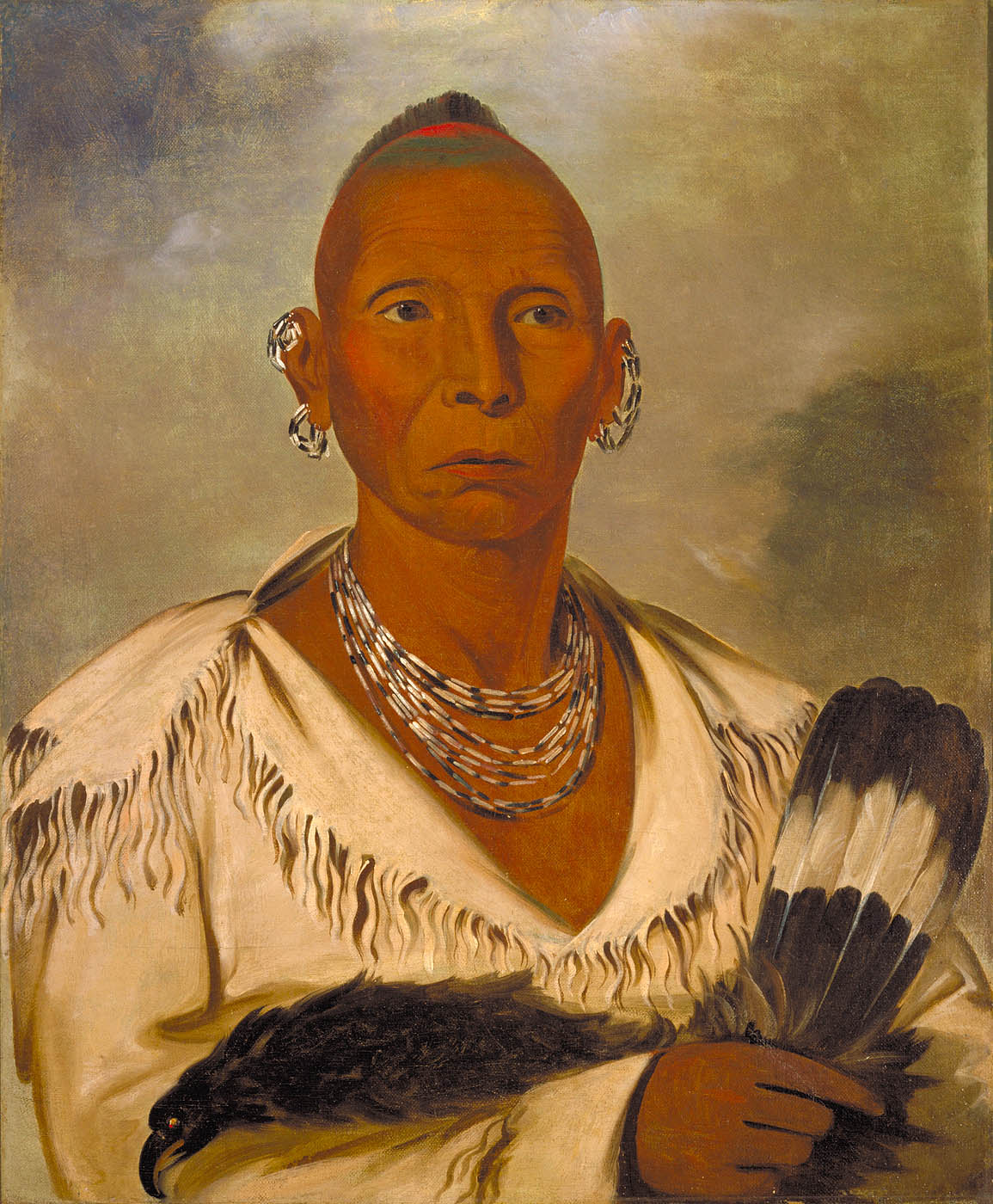
George Catlin, Ma-ka-tai-me-she-kia-kiak (Black Hawk), Sauk, 1832. He led the Black Hawk War in 1838.

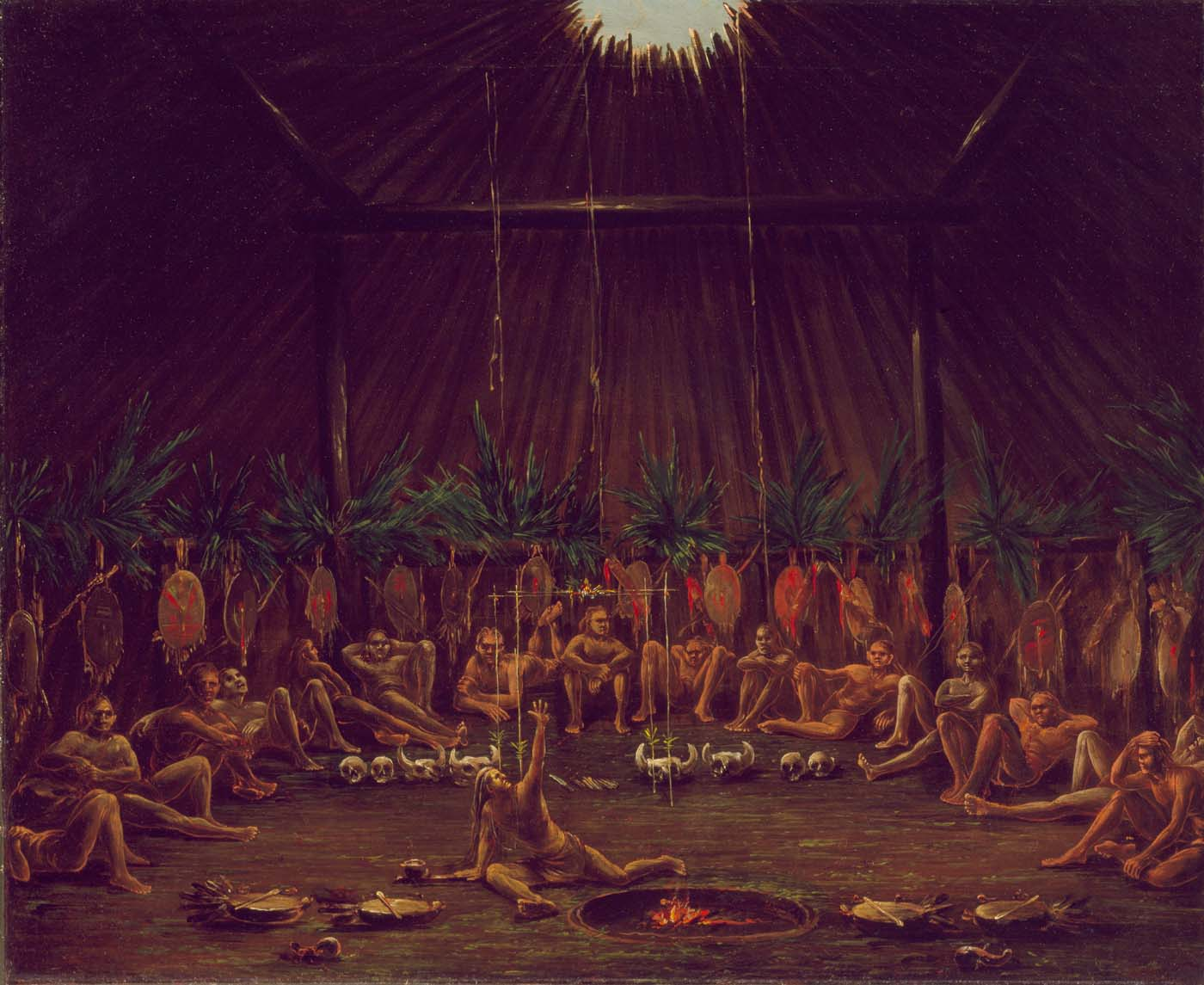
George Catlin, Interior of a Mandan lodge, Mandan O-kee-pa Ceremony, 1832 The painting was auctioned by the Field Museum in December 2011, it sold for $1.3 million, a record for a Catlin painting.

O'Fallon collected Native American artifacts. His house at Indian Retreat Plantation "was a veritable museum of Native American material culture". He also collected works of art of native peoples. George Catlin wanted to build a national Indian Gallery of each of the tribes, with people in traditional clothing. In the 1830s, George Catlin visited the western frontier and O'Fallon introduced him to Native Americans. A patron of the arts, O'Fallon commissioned or purchased portraits and landscapes from Catlin, acquiring 42 paintings. The works of art stayed within the O'Fallon family until 1894 when 35 paintings were purchased by the Field Museum of Natural History in Chicago. In 2004, the museum auctioned 31 of the paintings through Sotheby's. They sold for $17.4 million to an anonymous bidder. The museum kept portraits of Black Hawk, the Sauk leader and three other paintings. Catlin also painted O'Fallon's portrait around 1830.

During the early 1830s, O'Fallon purchased a partial skeleton of a fossil marine reptile from a fur trapper. This fossil caught the attention of German prince Maximilian of Weid-Neuwied during his 1832–1834 travels in the American West. He purchased the fossil and delivered it to University of Bonn naturalist Georg August Goldfuss for research, who published a study in 1845. This partial skeleton is the holotype specimen of Mosasaurus missouriensis.

== Personal life ==
In 1823, O'Fallon married Sophie Lee, the daughter of Patrick Lee, an auctioneer from St. Louis. They had eight children, including: Fannie, Clark, John, William Clark, Charles Thruston, Emily Rousseau, and Ellen O'Fallon.

His health continued to decline in the 1830s. He died on December 17, 1842.

== Legacy ==
Fallon County, the town of Fallon, and O'Fallon Creek in Montana are named for O'Fallon. O'Fallons Bluff of Nebraska is named after him. His correspondence are among the O'Fallon Family Papers at the Beinecke Rare Book and Manuscript Library, Yale University.

== Bibliography ==
- Gale, John (1969). The Missouri expedition, 1818-1820; the journal of Surgeon John Gale, with related documents. Norman, University of Oklahoma Press.
- Jones, Landon Y. (2004). William Clark and the shaping of the West. New York: Hill and Wang/Farrar, Straus and Giroux. ISBN 978-0-8090-3041-5.
- "Letters of Peter Wilson". Nebraska History. 42 (4). Nebraska State Historical Society: 238, 245. December 1961.
- Nichols, Roger L. (1995). Stephen Long and American frontier exploration. Norman: University of Oklahoma Press. ISBN 978-0-8061-2724-8.
