= Iowa in the American Civil War =

The state of Iowa played a significant role during the American Civil War in providing food, supplies, troops and officers for the Union army.

== Prelude to war ==
Iowa had become the 29th state in the Union on December 28, 1846. Settlers had defeated the Sauk, Meskwaki, and Ho-Chunk during the 1832 Black Hawk War, resulting in lopsided treaties ceding land to the settlers. Future treaties forced out these and Dakota peoples and opened nearly all land to settlers. As a territory, Iowa had a small number of enslaved people (16 counted in the 1840 census). When Iowa earned statehood, its new constitution outlawed slavery.

Many native-born settlers in Iowa were Yankees, who had moved West from New England and upstate New York across what is now the upper Midwest. From the Northeast, these settlers brought family-based smallholder farms rather than the large plantation systems of the Southern United States. By the time of war, only the extreme northwestern part of the state remained an unsettled frontier area. Prominent foreign-born places of origin included Germany and Ireland, and many of these immigrants established farms similar to those of the Yankees. Many of the settlers in Iowa were also of Mid-Atlantic (Pennsylvanian) stock. Some Upland Southern/Appalachian settlers from Virginia and Kentucky arrived and settled in Southern Iowa.

Most of the settlers in Iowa were located along Eastern rivers, especially the Mississippi, at the outbreak of war. Davenport was a prominent river port, and Muscatine had a large concentration of free blacks, either escaped fugitives or from Northeastern free states. Steamboat trade connected the state to other Mississippi river ports, including those in slave states. With the development in the 1850s of the Illinois Central and the Chicago and North Western Railway, Iowa's fertile fields were linked with Eastern supply depots. Agricultural producers and manufacturers in the state could readily get their products to the Union army by river or rail during the War.

Some settlers continued West into the Plains. One such settler was abolitionist John Brown, who used Iowa as a base for his operations in Kansas.

== Civil War ==
=== Politics ===
The Civil War era brought considerable change to Iowa's politics. During the 1850s, the state's dominant Democratic Party developed serious internal problems, as well as being unsuccessful in getting the national Democratic Party to respond to their local needs.

Iowans soon formed the newly emerging Republican Party. The new party opposed the expansion of slavery and favored opening newly conquered Western lands to free farmers, rather than slave-based plantations. The new party promoted homesteading, banking, railroads, and the creation of public agricultural colleges. Iowa had a strong anti-slavery presence that included some Protestant religious denominations (such as the Quakers and the evangelical denominations affected by the Second Great Awakening), German immigrants, and a free black community.

The Republican Party's "free soil, free labor, free men" platform favored small-scale farmers that made up Iowa and much of the present-day Midwest. Iowa voted for John C. Fremont, the first Republican presidential candidate, in 1856. In 1860 and 1864, it voted heavily for Abraham Lincoln and other Republican politicians. There was a strong antiwar "Copperhead" movement among settlers of Southern origins. Some pacifist religious groups, such as the Mennonites, favored the Democrats and their anti-war position and opposed mandatory military service. The Democratic party remained particularly in places around the Mississippi River such as Dubuque that had been heavily settled by German and Irish immigrants. While many Germans strongly opposed slavery, the Republican party had nativist elements, especially against Catholics.

=== The governorship ===
In 1859, Samuel J. Kirkwood was nominated for governor and defeated Democrat Augustus C. Dodge after a bitter campaign which focused on the slave issue. In 1860, Kirkwood's first year in office, the John Brown raid on Harpers Ferry further polarized the nation over slavery, and Kirkwood was clearly on the side of the abolitionists. When Barclay Coppock, a youth from Springdale, who was part of Brown's raid, fled to Iowa, Kirkwood refused to accept extradition papers for him from Virginia, and allowed Coppock to escape.

During the Civil War, Kirkwood gained national attention for his extraordinary efforts to secure soldiers and supplies from Iowa for the Union Army. A strong supporter of President Abraham Lincoln's policies during the American Civil War, he was active in raising and equipping dozens of regiments for the Union Army. In 1862, he attended the Loyal War Governors' Conference in Altoona, Pennsylvania, which ultimately gave Lincoln support for his Emancipation Proclamation.

=== Military recruitment ===
As the Civil War erupted, Governor Samuel J. Kirkwood led efforts to raise and equip volunteer troops for the Federal service. The 1st Iowa Infantry was raised for three-months duty from May until August 1861. It helped secure the strategic Hannibal and St. Joseph Railroad in northern Missouri, then endured a series of forced marches across the state, finally fighting with distinction in the Battle of Wilson's Creek, a task rewarded by the official Thanks of Congress, and two Iowans would later be awarded the Medal of Honor for their efforts in the fighting.

Iowa contributed 48 regiments of state infantry, 1 regiment of black infantry, 9 regiments of cavalry, and 4 artillery batteries. In addition to these Federally mustered troops, the state also raised a number of home guard or militia units, including the Northern Border Brigade and Southern Border Brigade, primarily for defense of the borders, but with a commission from governor Kirkwood authorizing the border brigades to cross into Missouri (or into Minnesota and Dakota Territory) to pursue Confederate or Indian raiders. Alexander Clark, prominent African American citizen of Muscatine, recruited the "60th Iowa Colored Troops, originally known as the 1st Iowa Infantry, African Descent." Despite being a small minority in the state, by war's end, a total of nearly 1,100 blacks from Iowa and Missouri served in the regiment.

=== Military action ===
There were no significant battles in Iowa, but the state sent large supplies of food to the armies and the eastern cities. Sporadically, Confederate partisans and bushwhackers raided Iowa. One such incursion in the fall of 1864 was designed to disrupt the reelection of Abraham Lincoln. Near the Missouri border, some Iowans were Copperhead anti-Lincoln sympathizers, and they provided a safe haven for guerrillas. On October 12, 1864, a dozen raiders disguised as Union soldiers terrorized Davis County, where they looted residences and kidnapped and murdered three Iowans near Bloomfield.

76,242 Iowa men (out of a total population of 674,913 in 1860) served in the military, many in combat units attached to the western armies. 13,001 died of wounds or disease (two-thirds of whom were of the latter). 8,500 Iowa men were wounded. Cemeteries throughout the South contain the remains of Iowa soldiers who fell during the war, with the largest concentration at Vicksburg National Cemetery. A number also died in Confederate prison camps, including Andersonville prison. Though the total number of Iowans who served in the military during the Civil War seems small compared to the more heavily populated eastern and southern states, no other state, north or south, had a higher percentage of its male population between the ages of 15 and 40 serve in the military during the course of the war.

=== Actions against Native Americans ===
Both the Ho Chunk (Winnebagos) and the Santee band of the Sioux nation posed the biggest threat to Iowa's northwestern border. Other local units included the Sioux City Cavalry—a militia company which, however, was subsequently mustered into US service and deployed to Dakota Territory after the Santee Sioux Uprising of 1862 and became General Alfred Sully's Headquarters Guard during the Union Army's subsequent "Punitive Expeditions" against 700 renegade Santee Sioux in 1863 and 1864. Sully selected the Sioux City Cavalry as his escort and guard over several other cavalry units because of the previous experience of its members who had worked for years before the war as trappers, traders and teamsters along the Military Road running from the US Army logistics depot at Sioux City northwest to the Dakota Territorial capital at Yankton and onward to Fort Randall which, at that time, was the largest US Army post on the upper Missouri river. As such these militia troopers were thoroughly experienced with other Sioux bands—such as the Yankton and Yankonais—and knew their sign, their language, and their customs. Likewise, the 6th Iowa Cavalry and one battalion of the 14th Iowa Infantry were deployed to Forts Randall, Pierre and Berthold, Dakota Territory as part of the same campaigns against the Santee renegades.

=== Iowans in the Confederacy ===
A minority of Iowans sympathized with the Confederacy and some Iowans served in the Confederate Army. The number, 76 identified individuals, including at least four men who were sons of Iowan politicians and James Harrison Williams, an Iowa state representative before he "went South".

== Postbellum memorialization ==
The Keokuk National Cemetery was established as a final resting place for bodies from five local U.S. Army hospitals in Keokuk. It holds over 600 Union soldiers, and 8 Confederate prisoners of war.

Following the war, a number of veterans organizations, and in particular the Grand Army of the Republic, played a prominent role in providing social functions, financial support, and memorialization of the former soldiers. The G.A.R. provided the funds and impetus for the construction of the Iowa Soldiers' Home in Marshalltown and other similar homes and hospitals, as well as orphanages.

== See also ==
- List of Iowa Civil War Units
- Camp McClellan (Iowa)
- Dubuque, Iowa, in the Civil War
- History of slavery in Iowa
- Samuel J. Kirkwood
- Alexander Clark
