= Lorenzo D. Immell =

Lorenzo Dow Immell
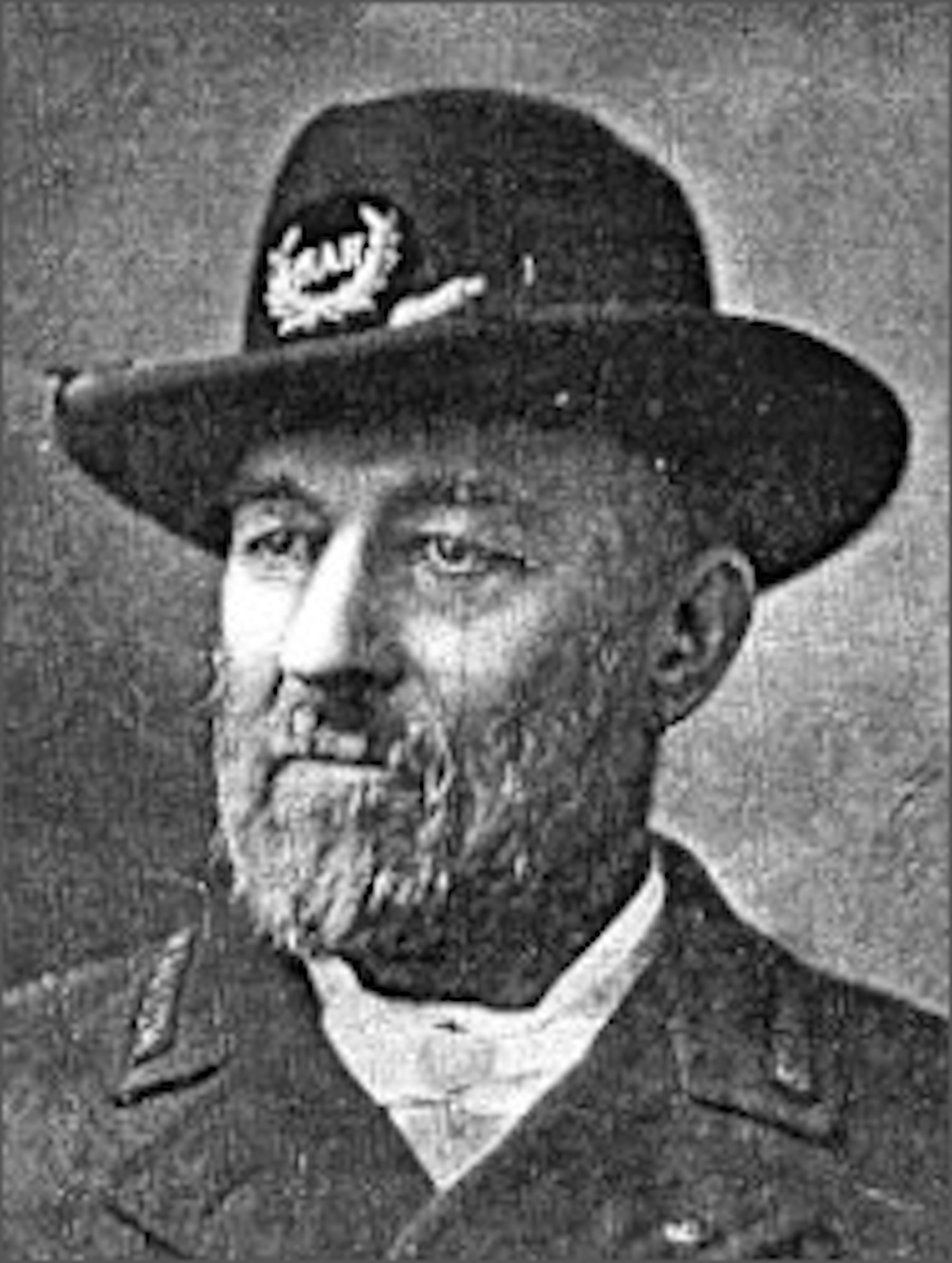
- Immell in 1895
- Born: June 18, 1837; Ross County, Ohio
- Died: October 31, 1912 (aged 75)
- Burial place: Jefferson Barracks National Cemetery, Lemay, St. Louis, Missouri, United States
- Military career
- Allegiance: United States of America
- Branch: United States Army
- Service years: 1860 - 1862
- Rank: Corporal
- Units: (United States) Company F, 2nd U.S. Artillery
- Conflicts: American Civil War; Battle of Wilson's Creek
- Awards: Medal of Honor

Lorenzo Dow Immell (June 18, 1837 – October 31, 1912) was a Union Army corporal in the American Civil War who received the U.S. military's highest decoration, the Medal of Honor.

== Biography ==
Immell was born June 18, 1837, in Ross County, Ohio, and joined the army from Fort Leavenworth, Kansas in August 1860. He was awarded the Medal of Honor, for extraordinary heroism shown at Wilson's Creek, Missouri, for bravery in action during the Battle of Wilson's Creek, while serving as a corporal with Company F, 2nd U.S. Artillery. He was discharged in February 1862. His Medal of Honor was issued on July 19, 1890.

Immell died at the age of 75, on October 31, 1912 and was buried in Jefferson Barracks National Cemetery, in Lemay, St. Louis, Missouri.

== Medal of Honor citation ==
The President of the United States of America, in the name of Congress, takes pleasure in presenting the Medal of Honor to Corporal Lorenzo Dow Immell, United States Army, for extraordinary heroism on 10 August 1861, while serving with Company F, 2d U.S. Artillery, at Wilson's Creek, Missouri, for bravery in action.

— Benjamin Harrison,

== Later life ==
After the war, Immell settled in Franklin County, Missouri. On January 6, 1866, he married Libbie Frances Bell (July 5, 1847 – March 20, 1870). They had two children, one of whom died in infancy.

Left with a young daughter, Immell married Caroline Rumple (January 27, 1852 – August 27, 1874) on July 25, 1870. They had three children, all of whom died young.

On February 9, 1875, Immell married Julia Rhodus (born October 23, 1857). As of 1885, they had five children, two of whom died young.

== See also ==
- List of American Civil War Medal of Honor recipients: G–L
