= 60th United States Colored Infantry Regiment =

Infantry regiment in the American Civil War

- Flag of the United States, 1863-1865
- Active: March 11, 1864, to October 15, 1865
- Country: United States
- Allegiance: Union
- Branch: Infantry; United States Colored Troops
- Engagements: American Civil War: Skirmish at Big Creek, AR, July 1864

The 60th United States Colored Infantry was a regiment of African-American troops from Iowa that served in the Union Army during the American Civil War.

== Service ==
The 60th U.S. Colored Infantry was organized from the 1st Iowa Volunteer Infantry Regiment (African Descent), a unit that had been recruited in the fall of 1863 at Keokuk, Iowa. In March 1864 the regiment was renamed as the 60th Infantry, United States Colored Troops, and served in various garrison duties in the Department of Arkansas assigned to the VII Corps (Union Army) for its entire service.

On July 26, 1864, near Wallace's Ferry on Big Creek, in the vicinity of Helena, Arkansas, elements of the 60th and 56th Colored Infantry regiments and Battery E of the 2nd U.S. Colored Artillery were attacked by a superior force of Confederate cavalry commanded by Col. Archibald S. Dobbins. Supported by about 150 men from the 15th Illinois Cavalry the infantry regiments organized a fighting retreat and at a crucial moment in the battle made a counter charge into the enemy line. The Union regiments made their way back to Helena. One officer and one enlisted man of the 60th regiment were killed in this battle, and one soldier was wounded.

The 60th U.S. Colored Regiment was mustered out of service on October 15, 1865.

== Commanders ==
Commanding officers of the 60th USCT Infantry:

- Colonel John G. Hudson
- Lieutenant Colonel Gardiner A.A. Deane
- Lieutenant Colonel Milton F. Collins, resigned 1864.

== See also ==
- List of United States Colored Troops Civil War Units

== Sources ==
- Civil War Archives
- Encyclopedia of Arkansas History
