= Ruben B. White =

American politician

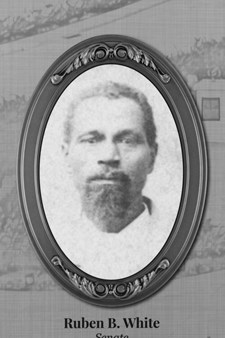

Arkansas Senate
- In office 1873–1874

Personal details
- Party: Republican

Ruben B. White was an American politician who served as a pastor and state senator in Arkansas. His older brother James T. White also served in the state legislature. He had mixed ancestry. He served in 1873 with John Goad representing Pulaski and White counties.
