= Martin Schubert (Medal of Honor) =

First Lieutenant Martin Schubert
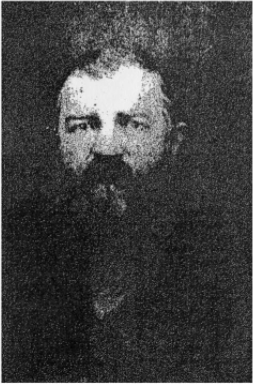
- Born: 29 June 1838; Germany
- Died: 25 April 1912 (aged 73); St. Louis, Missouri
- Burial place: Jefferson Barracks National Cemetery, Lemay, Missouri
- Military career
- Allegiance: United States
- Branch: Army
- Service years: 1861-1863, 1865
- Rank: First Lieutenant
- Units: Company E, 26th New York Infantry 14th New York Heavy Artillery
- Conflicts: Antietam, Maryland Fredericksburg, Virginia
- Awards: Medal of Honor

Martin Schubert (29 June 1838 - 25 April 1912) was a first lieutenant in the United States Army who was awarded the Presidential Medal of Honor for gallantry during the American Civil War. He was awarded the medal on 1 September 1893 for actions performed at the Battle of Fredericksburg in Virginia on 13 December 1862.

== Personal life ==
Schubert was born in Germany on 29 June 1838. His home of record was Elmira, New York and he was a butcher by trade. After the war, in 1893, he joined the Military Order of the Loyal Legion of the United States (MOLLUS), an organization of military officers dedicated to preserving United States government after the Lincoln assassination, and became its treasurer. He died on 25 April 1912 in St. Louis, Missouri and was buried in Jefferson Barracks National Cemetery in Lemay, Missouri.

== Military service ==
Schubert enlisted in the Army as a private on 7 May 1861 at Utica, New York. He was mustered into Company E of the 26th New York Infantry on 21 May 1861, where he was promoted to corporal on 22 December 1862. He was mustered out of this unit on 28 May 1863 in Utica and subsequently served with the 14th New York Heavy Artillery, where he eventually rose to the rank of first lieutenant.

Schubert was wounded at the Battle of Antietam in Maryland on 17 September 1862 and was granted a government furlough for his wounds. However, he returned to his unit at the Battle of Fredericksburg on 13 December 1862. He was noticed by Major General Ambrose Burnside, who promised him a Medal of Honor for returning. After several color bearers from his company were incapacitated, he picked up the colors and carried them until he was shot again on his left side. He carried that bullet for the rest of his life. The person who then picked up the colors, Joseph Keene, would also be awarded the Medal of Honor. Schubert later wrote that he "went into battle with the regiment, however, against the protests of my colonel and captain, who insisted that I should use the furlough. I thought the Government needed me on the battlefield rather than at home".

Schubert's Medal of Honor citation reads:

The President of the United States of America, in the name of Congress, takes pleasure in presenting the Medal of Honor to Private Martin Schubert, United States Army, for extraordinary heroism on 13 December 1862, while serving with Company E, 26th New York Infantry, in action at Fredericksburg, Virginia. Private Schubert relinquished a furlough granted for wounds, entered the battle, where he picked up the colors after several bearers had been killed or wounded, and carried them until himself again wounded.

— D. S. Lamont, Secretary of War
