= Martin Schubert (academic) =

German professor

Martin Schubert is professor of medieval German at the University of Duisburg-Essen. He is engaged in research into an anonymous Austrian author who translated the Bible into German 200 years before Martin Luther.
