= Charles Bentzoni =

American Civil War officer (1830–1907)

- Born: 1830; Prussia
- Died: 1907 (aged 76–77) United States
- Allegiance: United States
- Branch: United States Army
- Service years: 1860s–1880s
- Rank: Captain
- Commands: 56th United States Colored Infantry Regiment
- Conflicts: American Civil War

Charles Bentzoni (1830–1907) was an officer in the American Civil War. He led "Colored" troops during the war and after the war helped establish the orphanage that became Southland College in Arkansas.

He was born in Prussia. He emigrated to the United States in 1857.

He and his family were photographed with Sitting Bull and his family at Fort Randall in the Dakota Territory in 1882. He and his family were also photographed among other Native Americans at the fort.

During the Civil War he commanded the 56th United States Colored Infantry Regiment that occupied Helena, Arkansas after the war ended. In 1866 many soldiers under his command contracted cholera on their way home as they travelled by steamship. They were commemorated with an obelisk and later moved and are commemorated with a marker.

He was an officer with the 25th Infantry Regiment (United States). He was photographed standing at attention with Company B.

In 1884 he was serving as a recruiting officer in Buffalo, New York.

He is buried at the Hollywood Forever Cemetery.
