= Cantonment Martin =

Coordinates: 39.4431°N 94.9988°W

- Cow Island, in present-day Atchison County, Kansas

Site information
- Type: U. S. Army post
- Controlled by: U.S. Army

Site history
- Built: August or September 1818
- In use: August 1818 - October 1820
- Materials: cottonwood logs

Garrison information
- Past commanders: Capt. Wyly Martin, Maj. Willoughby Morgan
- Garrison: 350-400 men

Cantonment Martin was intended to be a temporary Army camp to provide support for an engineering expedition led by Stephen H. Long. Possibly the first troops marched from St. Louis, Missouri, to what is now the western border of Missouri. The troops, commanded by Capt. Wyly Martin, established a post that was probably on the northwest section of Cow Island, because of abundant cottonwood timber there.

Cow Island was named Isle au Vache by the French, which literally meant Island of the Cow. A lone cow was discovered on the island, in the Missouri River. It was speculated that Indians may have placed it there to prevent its escape or possibly it was a buffalo that strayed from its herd. Eventually the island's name was shortened to Cow Island. This island no longer exists. It is today on the Kansas side of the shore of the Missouri River between Atchison, Kansas, and Fort Leavenworth.

Long's expedition set out by boat from St. Louis in June 1819. He started with four boats, but lost one in a river snag along the way. The most useful was the Western Engineer, which was a stern wheeler steamboat. Long was charged with running a peace powwow between two Indian groups and the Indians agreed to stop committing depredations against the Army.

Long's men were at the post for the winter and they set out up the river. After they returned in October the post was abandoned. It was temporarily occupied in 1826 and it was called Camp Croghan.
