= Howard McKay =

American politician

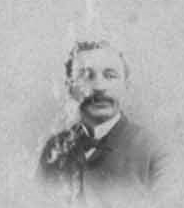
Howard McKay – Arkansas House of Representatives 1893

Howard McKay was a state representative in Arkansas. He represented Jefferson County, Arkansas, and was one of at least four African Americans in the Arkansas House of Representatives in 1893. George W. Bell was serving in the state senate. He and other Arkansas legislators were photographed in 1893.

== See also ==
- African American officeholders from the end of the Civil War until before 1900
