= Southland College (Arkansas) =

American college

- Type: Normal School
- Active: 1876–1925
- Founders: Alida & Calvin Clark
- Parent institution: Indiana Yearly Meeting
- Religious affiliation: Quaker
- Location: Helena, Arkansas, Arkansas; 34.5993°N 90.6876°W
- Campus: 167 acres (68 ha); Rural

Southland College, originally the Helena Orphan Asylum and eventually Southland Institute, was established in Helena, Arkansas for orphaned African American children April 19, 1864 by Indiana Quakers Alida and Calvin Clark and supported by various Quakers over several decades. Established as an orphanage called the Helena Orphan Asylum within Helena, the original request for the creation of an orphanage had come from General N. B. Buford who was the Federal Commandant at Helena during the civil war.

In 1866, it was relocated further north in Phillips County, almost 4 miles east of Lexa, Arkansas. Each officer and private soldier of the 56th U.S. Colored Infantry, at the suggestion of Colonel Carl "Charles" Bentzoni, donated a days pay so that the new site could be purchased for the college. Not long after an additional adjoining fifty acres was purchased by the Quakers to expand the site of the college. Over the subsequent years the site was expanded to around 167 acres.

In 1876, twelve years after its inception, it became Southland College and began to issue diplomas. The first three students to obtain their diplomas were Chandler Paschal, Emma Lancaster and Jerry Cross.

Although created for black children it was not until 1880 that the college employed its first black teachers, who were alumni of the college.

An official from the school sued E. A. Fulton and editor Julian T. Bailey of The Sun newspaper in Little Rock for libel in 1885.

George W. Bell was one of those who served as its president as well as a professor, and had been a student at Southland himself before going on to graduate from Lincoln University in Pennsylvania.

Over the years of the college, hundreds graduated as teachers including Anna String who after graduating in 1903 had a career that included her becoming president of the Arkansas State Teachers Association as well as receiving many honors. At its height in 1917 the enrolment had reached 500 students, although in its final year of 1925 that had shrunk to 130.

It closed in 1925 after several name changes and ongoing financial problems. After the closure by the Quakers, the college was briefly run by the Masons and then the AME Zions.

A series of private and parochial schools for African Americans succeeded it in Helena including a Peabody School and St. Cyprian's Day School.
