= Jefferson Barracks National Cemetery =

Historic veterans cemetery in St. Louis County, Missouri

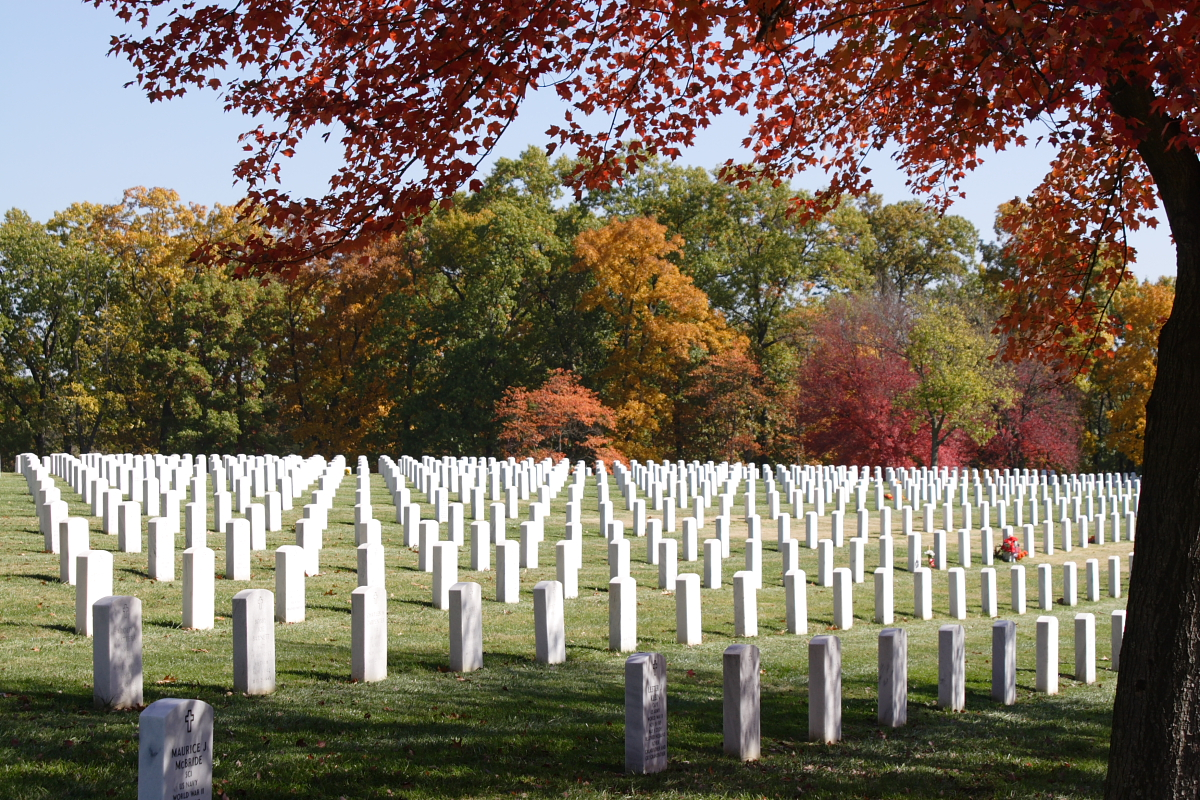
- Jefferson Barracks National Cemetery
- Interactive map of Jefferson Barracks National Cemetery

Details
- Established: 1826
- Location: Lemay, Saint Louis County, Missouri
- Country: United States
- Coordinates: 38°29′55″N 90°17′25″W
- Type: United States National Cemetery
- Size: 331 acres (134 ha)
- No. of graves: 237,000+
- Website: Official
- Find a Grave: Jefferson Barracks National Cemetery
- Jefferson Barracks National Cemetery
- U.S. National Register of Historic Places
- Location within Missouri Location within the United States
- Nearest city: Mehlville, Missouri
- Area: 295.7 acres (119.7 ha)
- Built: 1866
- Architectural style: Late Victorian
- MPS: Civil War Era National Cemeteries MPS
- NRHP reference No.: 98000840
- Added to NRHP: July 9, 1998

Jefferson Barracks National Cemetery is an American military cemetery located in St. Louis County, Missouri, just on the banks of the Mississippi River. The cemetery was established after the American Civil War in an attempt to put together a formal network of military cemeteries. It started as the Jefferson Barracks Military Post Cemetery in 1826 and became a United States National Cemetery in 1866.

The first known burial was Elizabeth Ann Lash, the infant child of an officer stationed at Jefferson Barracks.

The cemetery is administered by the Department of Veterans Affairs on the former site of Jefferson Barracks. It covers 331 acres (134 ha) and the number of interments as of 2021 is approximately 237,000. The cemetery is listed in the National Register of Historic Places.

== Notable interments ==
=== Medal of Honor recipients ===
- Major Ralph Cheli (1919–1944), for heroism while leading a bombing mission in World War II
- George Hobday (1839–1891), for action at the Wounded Knee Massacre, 1890
- Lorenzo D. Immell (1837–1912), for action at the Battle of Wilson's Creek, 1890
- Donald D. Pucket (1915–1944), pilot in the U.S. Army Air Forces, for action in World War II
- David Ryan (1836–1896), for action during the Indian Wars in 1877
- Martin Schubert (1838–1912), for action during the American Civil War in 1862
- Alonzo Stokes (1837–1876), for action at the Battle of the Little Wichita River, 1870
- Bruce Avery Van Voorhis (1908–1943), US Navy pilot, for action in the Pacific

=== Other notable individuals ===
- Michael Blassie (1948–1972), previously interred as the "Vietnam unknown soldier" at the Tomb of the Unknowns from 1984 to 1998, re-interred here in 1998 after DNA testing positively identified his remains
- Jack Buck (1924–2002), former St. Louis Cardinals baseball announcer
- Dennis Edwards (1943–2018), former lead singer with The Temptations
- Franklin Gritts (1915–1996), Cherokee artist and art director of the Sporting News
- Johnnie Johnson (1924–2005), pioneering rock musician
- Walter Mayberry (1915–1944), college football player who died in a Japanese POW camp
- Robert McFerrin Sr. (1921–2006), opera singer
- Hughie Miller (1886–1945), baseball player who earned the Distinguished Service Cross and Purple Heart in World War I
- Henry Townsend (1909–2006), musician
- Three veterans of the American Revolution buried in the Old Post Section:
  - Private Richard Gentry (1763–1843), veteran of the Revolutionary and the Indian Wars. He was present at the surrender of Cornwallis at Yorktown. His son Colonel Richard Gentry (1788–1837), a veteran of the War of 1812 and the Indian Wars, is also buried nearby.
  - Major Russell Bissell (1756–1807), veteran of the Revolutionary and the Indian Wars.
  - Colonel Thomas Hunt (1754–1808), a "Minuteman" at the Battle of Concord, April 1775. During the revolution he was wounded at the Battle of Stony Point and Siege of Yorktown. He was also a veteran of the Indian Wars and commanded the 1st Infantry Regiment.
- Other burials of note
  - Mass grave of sixty-one merchant marines and sailors who died in the fire aboard the SS J. Pinckney Henderson on August 19, 1943.
  - Mass grave for 123 of the 139 victims of the Palawan Massacre
  - Remains of 5 crewmen from B-36 Bomber 075 lost on the coast of British Columbia, Canada while conducting a training mission on February 13, 1950
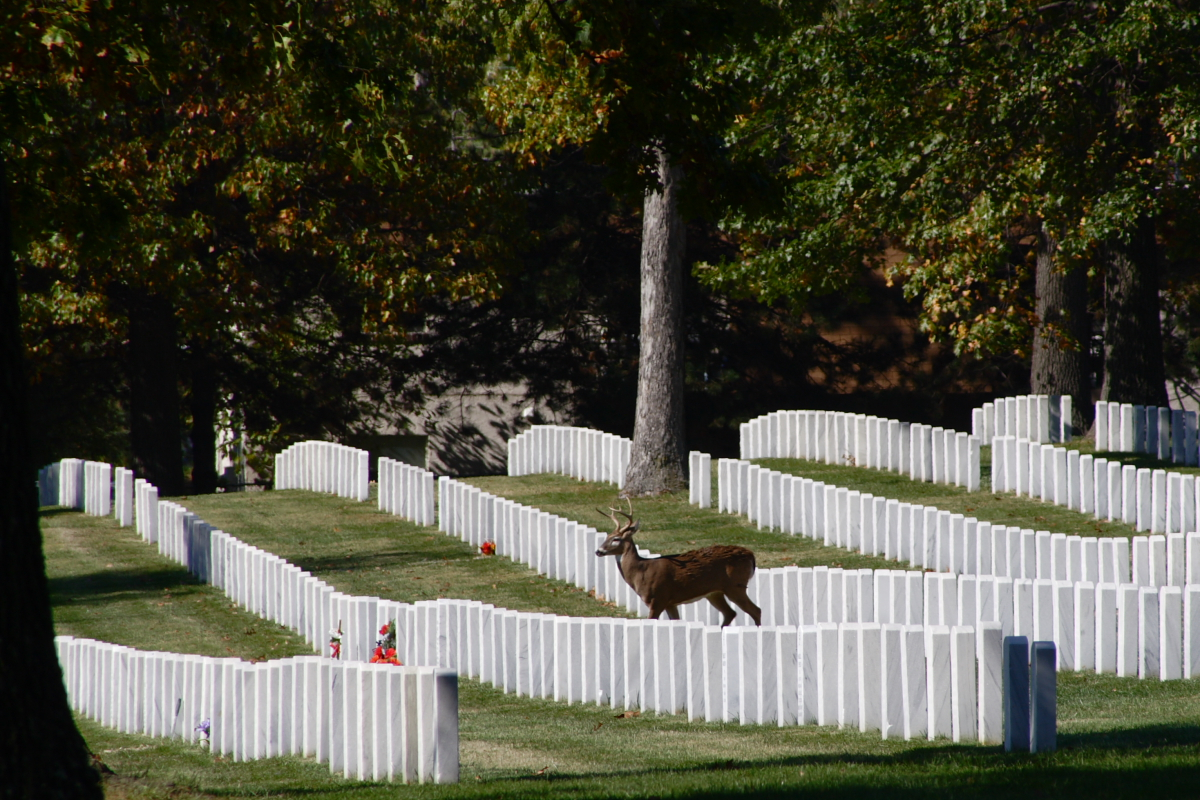
    Jefferson Barracks National Cemetery

== Memorial to the Confederate Dead ==
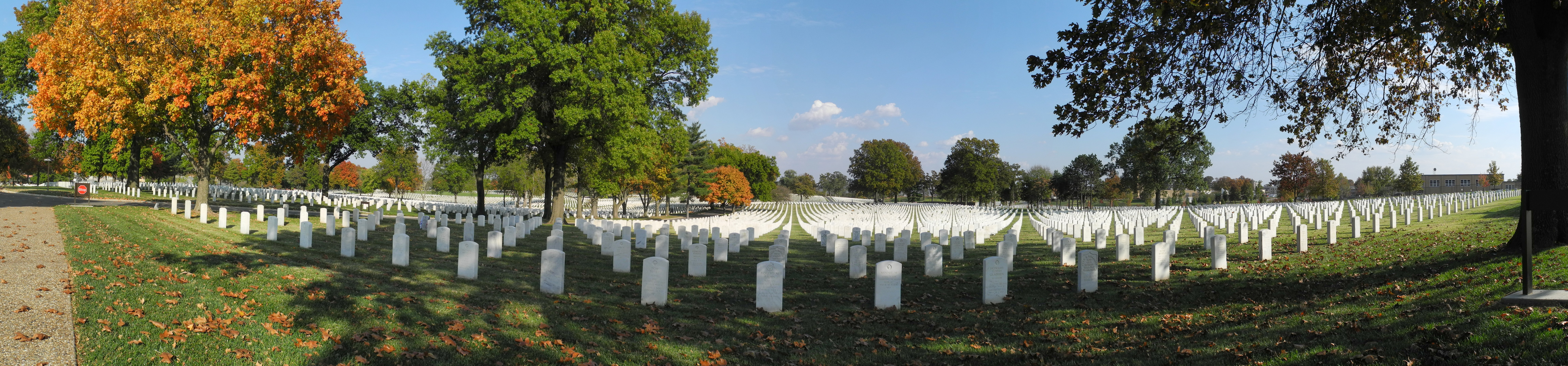
Panoramic view showing row upon row of simple white stone headstones converging in the distance.

A monument entitled Memorial to the Confederate Dead was placed in Jefferson Barracks on May 1, 1988 It is located in section 66 of the cemetery. Not to be confused with the removed Memorial to the Confederate Dead (St. Louis).

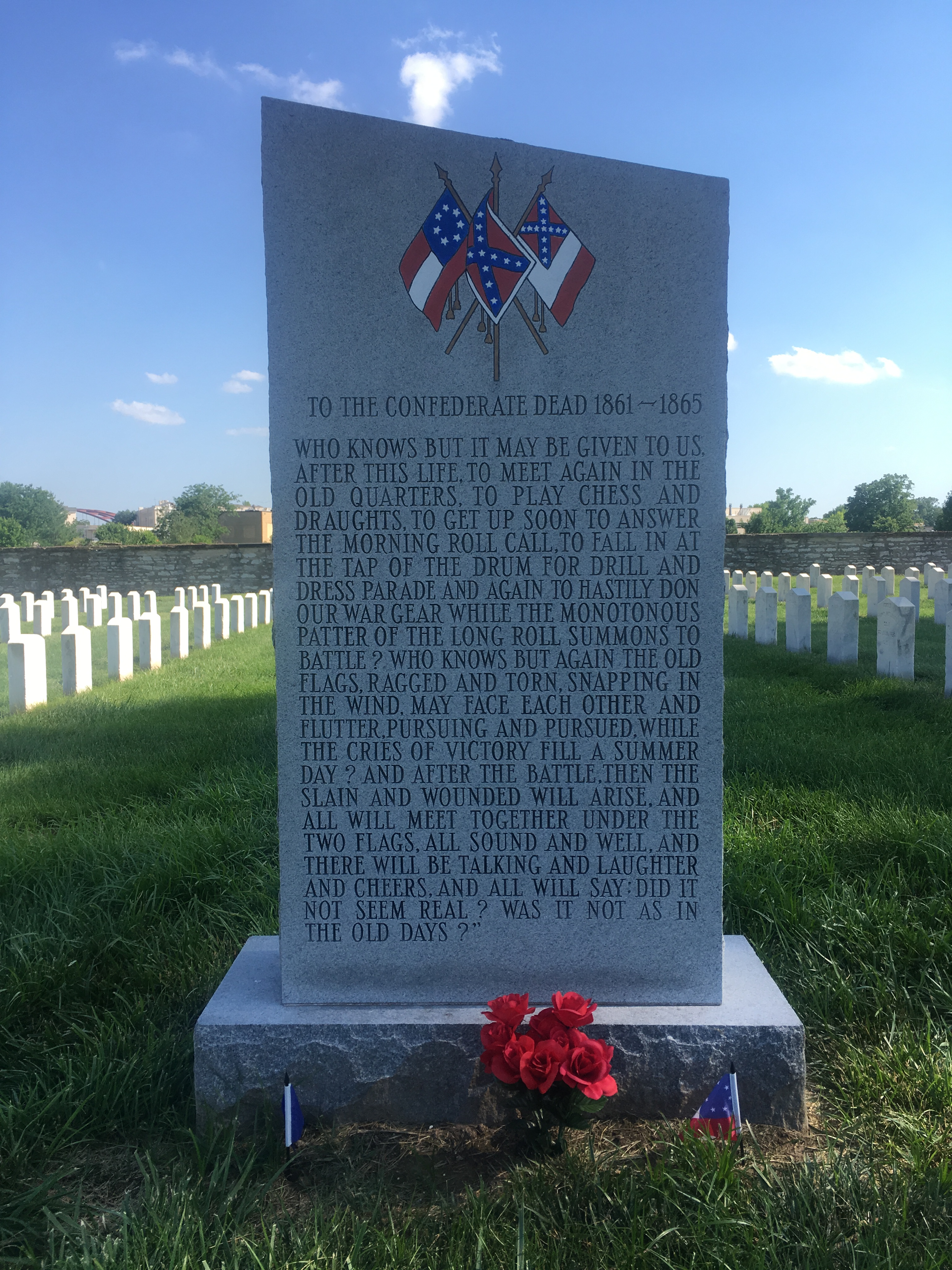
Memorial to the Confederate Dead

It was placed by the Jefferson Barracks Civil War Historical Association, Sons of Confederate Veterans, and the Missouri Society Military Order of the Stars and Bars. The front of the monument features three Confederate flags: the first national flag (seven-star variant of the "Stars and Bars"), the Confederate Battle Flag, and the last national flag ("Blood-Stained Banner").

Under the flags is a quote by Berry Benson:

To the Confederate Dead 1861–1865 Who knows but it may be given to us, after this life, to meet again in the old quarters, to play chess and draughts, to get up soon to answer the morning roll call, to fall in at the tap of the drum for drill and dress parade and again to hastily don out war gear while the monotonous patter of the long roll summons to battle? Who knows but again the old flags, ragged and torn, snapping in the wind, may face each other and flutter, pursuing and pursued, while the cries of victory fill a summer day? And after the battle, then the slain and wounded will arise, and all will meet together under the two flags, all sound and well, and there will be talking and laughter and cheers, and all will say: Did it not seem real? Was it not as in the old days?”

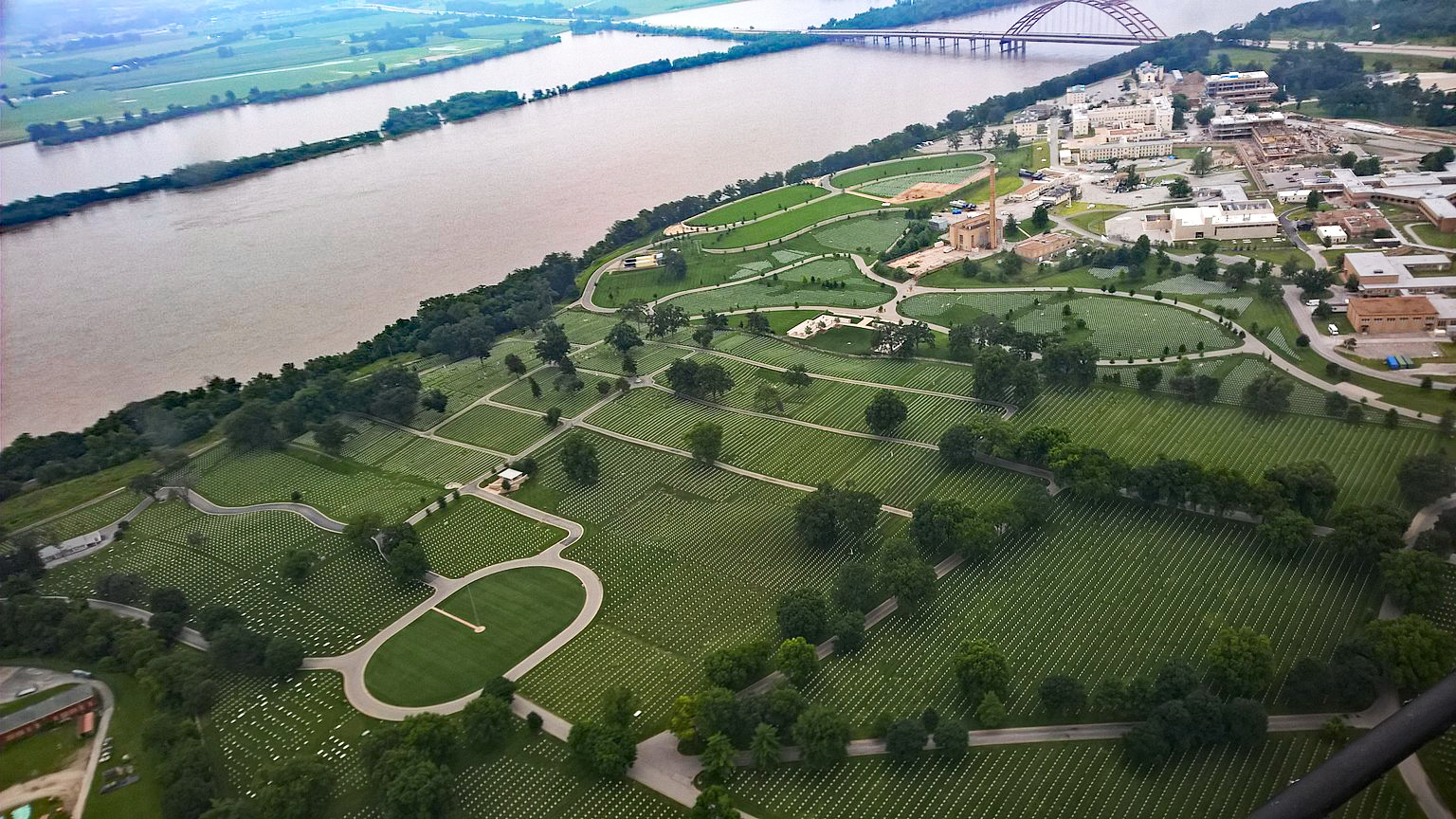
Aerial View of Jefferson Barracks National Cemetery and Jefferson Barracks Bridge

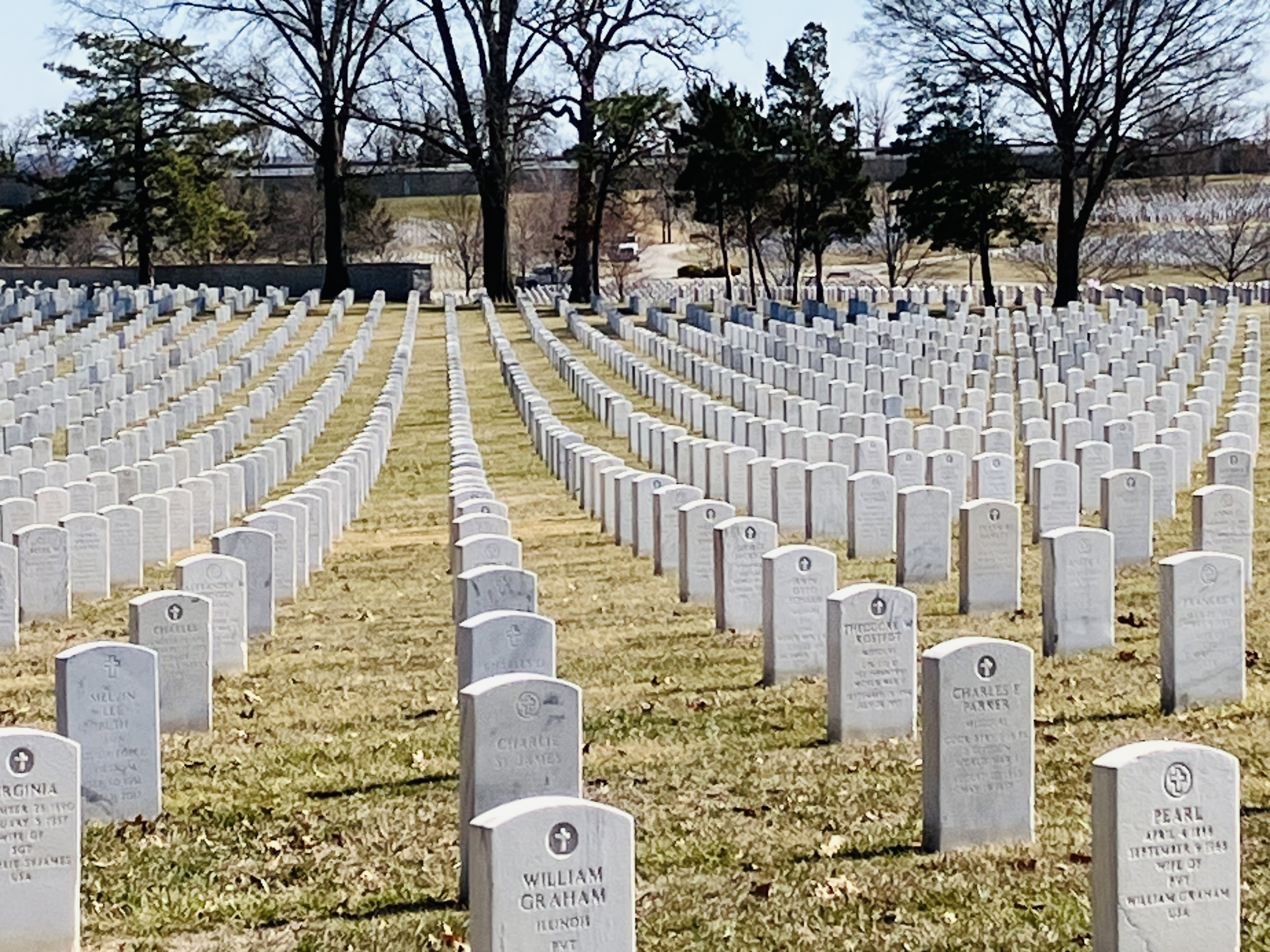
Headstones at Jefferson Barracks National Cemetery, St. Louis, MO

== 56th United States Colored Infantry Monument ==
A monument dedicated to the 56th United States Colored Infantry Regiment was erected on May 19th, 1939 following the re-interment of 175 officers and soldiers at Jefferson Barracks National Cemetery in a mass grave. The men had originally been buried at a cemetery at the former Koch Quarantine Hospital in St. Louis during a cholera outbreak in 1866, but were moved when the local community petitioned to have the soldiers be re-interred. The original stone obelisk monument that was erected at Koch Quarantine Hospital bore a brief inscription:

“To the memory of 175 non com. officers and privates of the 56. U.S.C. infty. Died of cholera in August 1866.”

The War Department claimed that the names of the unknown soldiers would be placed on the monument when their names were discovered.

In August of 2014, the St. Louis African American History and Genealogy Society and Sarah Cato successfully petitioned to add a bronze marker with the names of all 175 men to the monument, in addition to the names of the men that were lost along the Mississippi river and whose bodies are unable to be recovered.

The inscription of the bronze marker reads:

“Dedicated to the soldiers of the 56th Regiment U.S. Colored Troops who died of cholera while in transport along the Mississippi River and at St. Louis, Missouri in Summer of 1866. In 1939, the remains of many of these soldiers, buried in the Koch Hospital Cemetery were reinterred here. A marble obelisk that was placed at the hospital cemetery was also moved here [...] other soldiers in the same regiment who died while in transport along the Mississippi River and whose remains are unrecoverable are memorialized here. May they rest in peace: August 2014.”

== The Minnesota Monument ==
Jefferson Barracks National Cemetery is also home to one of the seven Minnesota Monuments commissioned by the State of Minnesota to commemorate soldiers from the state that died during the Civil War. The monument, built in 1922 and designed by sculptor John K. Daniels, depicts a bronze woman with a wreath below her waist on top of a granite stone.
