= 56th United States Colored Infantry Regiment =

- Active: As the 3rd Regiment Arkansas Volunteer Infantry: May 22, 1863; As 56th U.S. Colored Infantry : August 11, 1864, to September 15, 1866
- Country: United States
- Allegiance: Union
- Branch: Infantry
- Size: Regiment
- Engagements: American Civil War

Commanders
- 1st Commander: Col. Charles Bentzoni
- 2nd Commander: Col. Wm. S. Brooks

The 56th United States Colored Infantry was an infantry regiment that served in the Union Army during the American Civil War. The regiment was composed of African American enlisted men commanded by white officers and was authorized by the Bureau of Colored Troops which was created by the United States War Department on May 22, 1863. The regiment was originally organized as the 3rd Arkansas Volunteer Infantry (African Descent) on May 22, 1863.

== Organization ==
The regiment was organized at St. Louis in August 1863 as the 3rd Regiment Arkansas Volunteer Infantry (African Descent) and assigned to the VII Corps (Union Army). The regiment was dispatched to Helena, Arkansas, where it was initially utilized for garrison and guard duty. The regiment was re-organized at Helena, Arkansas, on March 11, 1864, and re-designated the 56th United States Colored Infantry. The 56th was commanded by Col. Carl Bentzoni, a Prussian born officer who trained the troops for combat.

== Service ==
The 3rd Regiment Arkansas Volunteer Infantry (African Descent) participated in the Expedition from Helena up White River February 4–8, 1864. and up St. Francis River February 13–14.

On July 26, 1864, near Wallace's Ferry in Arkansas, the unit (now re-designated as the 56th United States Colored Infantry Regiment), along with the 60th Colored Infantry regiments and Battery E of the 2nd U.S. Colored Artillery were attacked by a superior force of Confederate cavalry commanded by Col. Archibald S. Dobbins. Supported by about 150 men from the 15th Illinois Cavalry, the infantry regiments organized a fighting retreat and at a crucial moment in the battle made a counter charge into the enemy line. The unit was praised by the commander of Battery E in his after action report:.

HDQRS. BATTY. E, SECOND U.S. COL. ARTY. (LIGHT),
Helena, Ark., July 29, 1864.
SIR: I have the honor to report that on the evening of July 25, at 4.30 p.m., in company with Colonel Brooks, of the Fifty-sixth U.S. Colored Infantry, in command of detachments from the Fifty-sixth and Sixtieth U.S. Colored Infantry, with one section of Battery E, Second U.S. Colored Artillery (light), commanded by Capt. J. F. Lembke, we moved out on the Little Rock road with orders to guard the crossing at Big Creek, eighteen miles from this place....
Colonel Brooks with part of the infantry crossed over to make a reconnaissance. In less than an hour he returned, reporting no enemy in that vicinity, and at once ordering the force left in the rear forward, and that breakfast be got and the teams watered and fed. Before the teams were all un-hitched it was rumored that the enemy was advancing upon our rear. I at once got the rifled gun into position about 200 yards from the creek and facing our left, and awaited their approach. The enemy were concealed in the thick timber and were within 150 yards of us before I opened on them, when they charged with a yell, but being well supported by Captain Brown, of the Sixtieth, with sixteen men, and Captain Patten, of the Fifty-sixth, with twenty-five men, and using canister rapidly and carefully, we repulsed them....
During the whole fight the colored men stood up to their duty like veterans, and it was owing to their strong arms and cool heads, backed by fearless daring, alone that I was able to get away either of my guns. They marched eighteen miles at once, fought five hours, against three to one, and were as eager at the end as at the beginning for the fight. Never did men, under such circumstances, show greater pluck or daring.
I am, very respectfully, your obedient servant,
H. T. CHAPPEL,
First Lieutenant.

Colonel Brooks of the 56th was mortally wounded early in the action and Lieutenant Colonel Moses Reed assumed command. The 56th and the other Union forces made their way back to Helena. Union casualties in the battle were 19 killed, 40 wounded, and four missing. Confederate losses are unknown.

General Order No. 14, Department of Arkansas (dated February 1, 1865), from Little Rock, reported the 56th United States Colored Infantry as belonging to the 2nd Brigade of the 1st Division of the 7th Army Corps.

The 56th Colored Regiment losses during service consisted of: four officers and 21 enlisted men killed or mortally wounded; and two officers and 647 enlisted men by disease; for a total of 674 fatalities. The vast majority of the deaths due to disease occurred during a cholera epidemic that struck in August 1866 while the regiment was waiting to muster out at Jefferson Barracks Military Post near St. Louis. One hundred seventy-five African American enlisted men of the 56th U.S. Colored Infantry are buried together in a mass grave at Jefferson Barracks National Cemetery.

== Mustered out of service ==
Mustered out September 15, 1866.

The U.S. government credits 5,526 men of African descent as having served in the Union Army from the state of Arkansas during the conflict.

== See also ==
- List of Arkansas Civil War Union units
- List of United States Colored Troops Civil War Units
- United States Colored Troops
