= George C. Shell =

American politician

Member of the Arkansas Senate from the 15th district
- In office January 14, 1895 – April 10, 1895
- Preceded by: George W. Bell
- In office January 11, 1897 – March 10, 1897
- Succeeded by: Richard Aylett Buckner

Personal details
- Education: University of Arkansas

George C. Shell was a lawyer and politician in Arkansas. He served in the Arkansas State Senate. He was a Democrat and represented Desha and Chicot counties. His post office was in Lake Village.

He graduated from the University of Arkansas with a Bachelor of Laws degree in 1882. He edited the Chicot Press newspaper.

He was recommended by the district bar, August 1893, to replace judge Carroll D. Wood as judge for the tenth judicial district while elections for a successor were completed.

He was elected to the Arkansas State Senate in 1895 replacing George W. Bell, an African American. He served in the 30th and 31st general assemblies, the first in 1895 and the second in 1897.
