= George W. Bell =

American politician

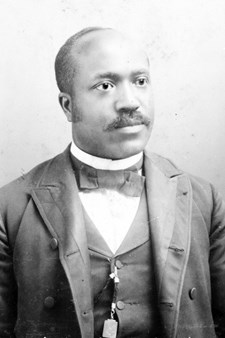

Member of the Arkansas Senate from the 15th district
- In office January 12, 1891 – January 14, 1895
- Preceded by: W. H. Logan
- Succeeded by: George C. Shell

Personal details
- Born: Ethiopia
- Education: Lincoln University

George Waltham Bell was an American doctor who served in the Arkansas Senate from 1891 to 1895. He was a graduate of Lincoln University in Pennsylvania. He served as president of Southland College.

Bell was elected to the Arkansas Senate and served representing the 15th District (Desha and Chicot County, Arkansas Chicot counties) in the 28th Arkansas General Assembly and the 29th Arkansas General Assembly. While in office, he opposed separate coach laws. J. H. Smith wrote a letter disputing Bell's descriptions of his speech in 1891.

== See also ==
- African American officeholders from the end of the Civil War until before 1900
