= Osterhout =

- Language: Dutch

Origin
- Meaning: east of the woods Oosterhout

Other names
- Variant forms: Van Osterhout, Van Oosterhout

Osterhout is a Dutch surname derived from Oosterhout. Variants of this name include Van Oosterhout^{[nb]} and Van Osterhout. According to the 2010 United States census, it ranks as the 13,330th most common name out of 160,975 last names, occurring 2288 times in the sampled data.

== Dutch history ==
In the providence of North Brabant is a national park of 1,300 hectares (3,200 acres) of woods. In 1324, William Van Duivenvoorde built a fortified castle just east of the woods. He died in 1352 and was buried in a cloister in Brussels. His castle took on the name of East of the Woods, which in their tongue is Ooster-ter-hout, and there the name began. Around the castle grew up the city of Oosterhout. Southwest of it is the city of Breda, a manufacturing center. The two cities are now grown together, the city of Oosterhout being the high class residential part.

The Dutch family name Osterhout is classified as being of habitation name origin. This term denotes names whose origin lies in the place of residence of the initial bearer of his family. Habitation names tell us whence hailed the progenitor of the family; they can give the location of the residence of the initial bearer, and some will even indicate a distinguishing sign which was associated with that residence. In the case of the family name Osterhout, the application can be traced to the community of Oosterhout, which lies in the vicinity of Breda in the Dutch providence of Noord-Branbant. The feudal domain of Oosterhout is mentioned in a document from the year 1199 wherein Beatrix van Strijen, who then controlled the property, made a grant of ten percent of its revenues to the chapter of the Knights Templar based in Brida. Serious damage was done to the church, council chamber, and private residences during the Dutch war for independence from Spain (1568 - 1648).

While many Dutch family names have been in existence for hundreds of years, particularly among the nobility and merchant classes, the use of heredity surnames amongst the more isolated rural population has only been established within the last two hundred years.

=== Coat of arms ===
The Osterhout coat of arms is officially documented in Rietstap's Armorial General. The original description of the arms or shield is as follows:

D'ARG, A TRIOS CROISS. DE SA.; AU FILET DE GU., EN BANDE, BR. SUR LE TOUT

When translated, the blazon also describes the original colors of the Osterhout arms: "Silver, 3 black crescents; a narrow red band place diagonally over all." Above the shield and helmet is the crest, which is described as: "A plume of black rooster feathers issuing from a silver pipe; above the crest is the war cry "Duivenvoorde".

== U.S. pilgrimage ==
There are many branches of the Oosterhout family, with the first having started with Jan Jansen Van Oosterhout who immigrated to Kingston, New York in the 1650s. His descendants initially settled in the states of New England with later branches eventually appearing in most U. S. States and Canada.

Another branch of the Osterhout family is believed to have immigrated to the United States in the early 20th century. A branch of the Oosterhout family from Joure, Haskerland, Friesland, Netherlands immigrated to Texas in 1922.

Some possible variations of the name include Oosterhout, Osterhaus, Oosterhoudt, Oosterhouse, Osterhouse, Osterhaut, Osterhoudt, Ostrout, etc.

== As surname ==
- Anna Maria Osterhout, wife of Theodore Miller Edison, daughter-in-law of Thomas Edison
- Charlie Osterhout (1856–1933), American baseball player
- David Osterhout, American actor
- George Everett Osterhout (1858–1937), American botanist
- Marian Irwin Osterhout (1888–1973), American botanist
- Mildred Osterhout Fahrni (1900–1992), Canadian peace activist
- Ralph Osterhout (born 1946), American inventor
- Winthrop John Van Leuven Osterhout (1871–1964), American botanist

== As place name ==
=== Pennsylvania ===
- Osterhout, Pennsylvania, Wyoming County, Pennsylvania
- Osterhout Creek, Wyoming County, Pennsylvania
- Osterhout Mountain, Wyoming County, Pennsylvania
- Osterhout Road, Pennsylvania Route 92, Tunkhannock, Pennsylvania
- Osterhout Free Library, Wilkes-Barre, Pennsylvania

=== Other places ===
- Doane College Osterhout Arboretum, Crete, Nebraska
- Osterhout Concert Theater, in Binghamton University's Anderson Center for the Performing Arts, Binghamton, New York
- Osterhout Cottage, Cold Springs Harbor Laboratory, Cold Spring, New York
- Osterhout Lake, Allegan County, Michigan
- Osterhout Log Cabin, Toronto, Ontario, Canada
- Osterhout Mound Park, Hannibal, Missouri
- Osterhout Reservoir, Windsor, Colorado

== As taxonomy ==
- "Osterhout's Milkvetch",Astragalus osterhoutii
- "Osterhout's Thistle",Cirsium clavatum var. osterhoutii
- "Osterhout's catseye",Cryptantha osterhoutii
- "Osterhout's beardtongue", Penstemon osterhoutii
- "pointtip twinpod",Physaria floribunda ssp. osterhoutii

== Notes ==
1. "Van Oosterhout", literally means "of Oosterhout" (see Dutch van and Oosterhout)

== See also ==
- Ousterhout
