= Roger Williams (disambiguation) =

Roger Williams (1603–1683) was an English theologian, author, and the founder of Rhode Island.

Roger Williams may also refer to:

== Arts and entertainment ==
- Roger Williams (actor) (1898–1964), American film actor
- Roger Williams (pianist) (1924–2011), American pianist
- Roger Williams (organist) (born 1943), British (Welsh) organist and musicologist
- Roger Ross Williams (born 1962), American television director, producer and writer
- Roger Williams (playwright) (born 1974), Welsh playwright and screenwriter
- Roger Williams (born 1979), American musician with Roger Williams and the All Mixed-Up Quartet
- Roger Williams (author), American science fiction author

== Law and politics ==
- Roger Williams (Wisconsin politician) (1836–1916), American politician, member of the Wisconsin State Assembly
- Roger Williams (Georgia politician) (1933–2019), American politician, member of the Georgia House of Representatives
- Roger Williams (British politician) (born 1948), British politician
- Roger Williams (Texas politician) (born 1949), American politician, member of the U.S. House of Representatives from Texas

== Military ==
- Roger Williams (soldier) (1539/40–1595), Welsh soldier of fortune and military theorist
- Roger D. Williams (1856–1925), American army officer
- Roger Q. Williams (1894–1976), American army air force pilot and aviation pioneer
- Roger Garnons Williams (1891–1961), Welsh cricketer and British Army officer

== Science and medicine ==
- Roger Williams (chemist) (1890–1978), American chemist at Du Pont; Perkin Medal recipient
- Roger J. Williams (1893–1988), American biochemist
- Roger Williams (hepatologist) (1931–2020), British liver specialist
- Roger L. Williams, American structural biologist
- W. Roger Williams (1854–1948), English pathologist, surgeon, cancer researcher and medical writer

== Others ==
- Roger Lawrence Williams (1923–2017), American historian
- Roger Williams (professor), Welsh educationalist
- Roger Williams (American football) (born 1946), American football player

== Other uses ==
- Roger Williams Park, Rhode Island, United States
- Roger Williams University, Rhode Island, United States
- Roger Williams (train), an innovative DMU train introduced by the New York, New Haven and Hartford Railroad in the United States in the 1960s

== See also ==
- William Rogers (disambiguation)
