= Janese Swanson =

American inventor and software developer (born 1958)

- Born: 1958 (age 67–68)
- Education: San Diego State University University of San Francisco
- Occupations: Inventor; Software developer

Janese Swanson (born 1958) is an American inventor and software developer. Swanson co-developed the first of the Carmen Sandiego educational games, and founded the company Girl Tech, which creates products aimed at making technology more interesting for girls. She has developed award-winning curricula, electronic toys, and books that encourage girls to explore technology and inventions. Her toy inventions include the Snoop Stopper Keepsake Box, Me-Mail Message Center, Zap N’ Lock Journal, and Swap-It Locket. Her publications include Tech Girl's Internet Adventures, Tech Girl's Activity Book, and Girlzine: A Magazine for the Global Girl.

== Biography ==
Swanson was raised by her mother in San Diego, California, after her father was killed in the Vietnam War. She graduated from Orange Glen High School in 1975, and while in high school, she worked a part-time job at Sears. Not only was she the youngest, she was also the only female salesperson in the television and sound system department and she received awards for her work in sales. She earned a bachelor's degree in liberal studies in 1981 from San Diego State University, and went on to work as a teacher, a flight attendant and a model. She convinced a computer company to donate laptops, and taught her mainly female fellow flight attendants how to use them during their spare time.

She also continued her studies, eventually earning a total of seven academic degrees including a doctorate in organization and leadership, with a doctoral thesis on gender issues in product design, play patterns and gender preferences. Swanson received her Ed.D. in Organization and Leadership Technology in 1997 from the University of San Francisco.

In the late 1980s, Swanson was hired by Broderbund Software as a product manager, where she helped develop The Treehouse, The Playroom, and the Macintosh edition of the game Where in Time Is Carmen Sandiego?. She invented gadgets for her daughter, including a voice recording device that she hoped to install in Jackie's daycare cubby and in her own office. She said, "I missed her so much that I used to call my home answering machine to hear her voice, and I thought this would let me talk to her during the day." In 1992, she left Broderbund to develop technology for electronically altering a voice's pitch and modulation; started her own company, Kid One For Fun, for developing and licensing Yak Bak to Yes! Entertainment and Talkboy F/X+ to Tiger Electronics.

In 1995, Swanson decided that she wanted to create toys aimed specifically at girls, and founded Girl Tech as an independent company with headquarters near her home in San Rafael, California. Products included the "Friend Frame" talking picture frame, the Snoop Stopper "Keepsafe" Box storage box with a remote-controlled lock, Me-Mail Message Center, Zap N’ Lock Journal, and Swap-It Locket, and a remote listening device called "Bug 'Em". Swanson claimed that her vision for the company did not match the expectations of existing toy distributors: "For two years after I founded the company, toy store buyers would say, 'Can you make it pink?' 'Can't you make it for boys?' And I would say, 'No, this is what girls like to play with.'" This company also publishes books on technology for girls, works with community groups, and developed a technology curriculum for Girl Scout councils. She later sold the company to Radica Games, now a division of Mattel, for $6 million. She has also licensed her technologies to Hasbro and Sega.

Swanson worked as Education Coordinator at the United States Mint, and was a founder at The Art Apprentice. She is now an art teacher in the Del Mar Union School District, and uses computer technology to encourage students' creation of art work. Her students' work has received an "Innovative Video In Education" (iVIE) award in 2008 from the San Diego County Office of Education, and she was the education chair of SIGGRAPH in 2007.
