= The Treehouse =

The Treehouse may refer to:

- A programming block on YTV (TV channel)
- The Treehouse (video game), a 1991 point-and-click computer game made by Broderbund
- The Treehouse: Eccentric Wisdom from my Father on How to Live, Love, and See, a book by Naomi Wolf

== See also ==
- Treehouse
