= Ousterhout =

Ousterhout is a surname. Notable people with the surname include:

- Douglas Ousterhout (fl. 1982), American surgeon
- John Ousterhout (born 1954), American computer scientist

== See also ==
- Osterhout
- Oosterhout (disambiguation)
