= Talkboy =

Voice recorder and sound novelty toys

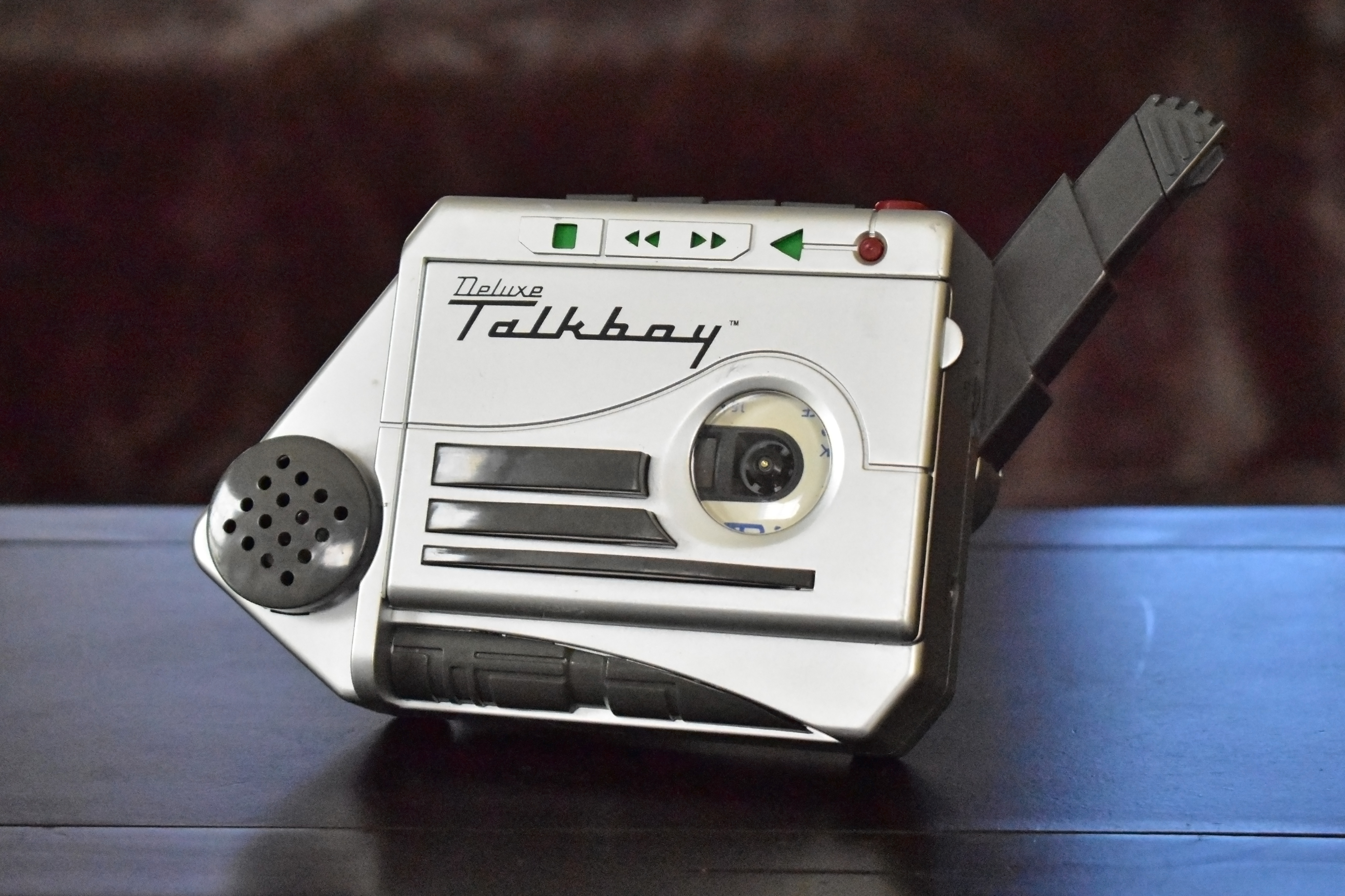
- Deluxe Talkboy, with the microphone extended
- Type: Voice recorders, sound novelty
- Company: Tiger Electronics
- Country: North America, United Kingdom
- Availability: 1992–1999
- Materials: Plastic
- Features: Variable-speed voice changer (some products); Sound effects (some products)

Talkboy is a line of handheld voice recorder and sound novelty toys manufactured by Tiger Electronics in the 1990s. The brand began as a result of a promotional tie-in with the 1992 film Home Alone 2: Lost in New York; the most well-known product was the Deluxe Talkboy, a cassette recorder and player with a variable-speed voice changer that caused toy crazes over several holiday shopping seasons beginning in 1993.

The Talkboy was originally conceived as a prop for Home Alone 2 for the lead character Kevin MacCallister to use to outsmart adults. At the request of writer John Hughes and distributor 20th Century Fox, Tiger designed and built the prop. The company was given permission by the movie studio to sell a retail version of the toy, and it released two cassette recorders modeled after the film prop in 1992 and 1993, respectively. The original model did not have the voice changer of the film version and sold only moderately during the 1992 holiday shopping season. Tiger added the feature to the Deluxe model, which was released in April 1993. Following the release of Home Alone 2 on home video in July and a cross-promotion with Life cereal, interest in the toy spiked. Retailers had severely underestimated demand, and as a result the Deluxe Talkboy was one of the most highly sought-after toys during the 1993 holiday shopping season, selling out of stores across the United States. The product continued to be a best-seller in subsequent holiday shopping seasons. A pink version of the cassette recorder called Deluxe Talkgirl was released in 1995.

The success of the Talkboy cassette recorders spawned a product line of electronic sound novelty toys, including a phone, walkie talkies, and a radio. For subsequent recording devices, Tiger transitioned to digital technology, using solid-state storage and adding sound effects, beginning with Talkboy/Talkgirl F/X+ pens in 1995, which sold more than a million units in 45 days.

== Origin as movie prop ==
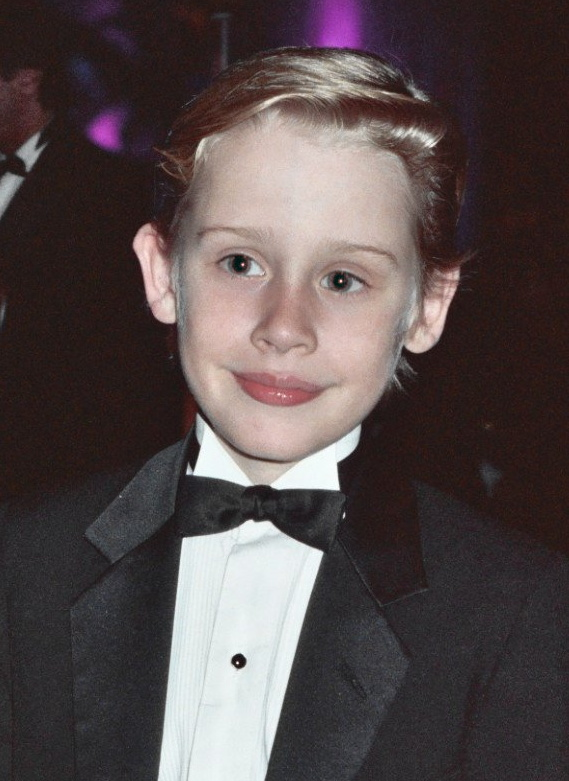
The original Talkboy was designed as a prop to be used by Macaulay Culkin's character, Kevin McCallister, in the 1992 film Home Alone 2: Lost in New York.

The original Talkboy model was a cassette player and recorder that was conceived as a prop for the 1992 film Home Alone 2: Lost in New York. In the film, the main character Kevin McCallister (played by Macaulay Culkin) uses the Talkboy to outsmart adults; he successfully makes a reservation at the Plaza Hotel by slowing his voice down with the toy's variable-speed voice changer to pass himself off as an adult, and later he records incriminating statements by the burglars Marv and Harry.

Originally, writer John Hughes specified in his script only that a futuristic recording device would be needed; he and the film's distributor 20th Century Fox wanted something that was realistic yet appeared to be cutting edge. Nancy Overfield-Delmar, the vice president of marketing for 20th Century Fox licensing and merchandising, said: "It was important to John that Kevin not use something already out in the marketplace. Kevin has to be one step ahead of other kids."

Weeks before filming on Home Alone 2 was scheduled to begin, the toy-licensing deal for the film that Overfield was negotiating with Mattel fell through. Forced to find a last-minute replacement, she turned to toy licensee Tiger Electronics. Overfield knew the company's co-founder and executive vice president Roger Shiffman from a previous licensing deal for the cartoon Bobby's World. Shiffman was persuaded to sign a deal to produce Home Alone 2's toys, which also included "Monster Sap" spraying goo and a screaming backpack, with the promise of escalating royalty payments that would limit the risk to Tiger Electronics.

To design the as-yet-undeveloped recorder prop, Hughes and Shiffman met at Shiffman's office several times after 20th Century Fox made an introduction between the two. Hughes's original concept in the script was for Kevin "to have a gun", but Shiffman thought it was impractical since the character would need to travel with it through O'Hare International Airport in the movie. Shiffman told Hughes to let him work on the idea, and his team at Tiger subsequently built a prototype in three weeks. The ensuing design for the Talkboy featured a handle that would allow the device to slide onto a hand and a retracting microphone so it would look "more lifelike".

== Original retail Talkboy ==
Following the success of the original Home Alone (1990), which grossed $285 million in North America, the third-highest amount at the time, an extensive marketing and cross-promotion campaign was undertaken for Home Alone 2. About 80 licensed products were released to tie-in with the movie, while corporate partners included Coca-Cola, Bloomingdale's, Kids "R" Us, and American Airlines. As part of the campaign, Tiger was given permission by 20th Century Fox to sell a retail version of Talkboy in stores, with Shiffman negotiating a "modest royalty" to build the brand.

The original retail Talkboy model requires 4 AA batteries and uses a standard cassette tape. However, it does not feature the voice changer of the film prop. The toy was previewed at the American International Toy Fair in New York in February 1992, and was released to market for that year's holiday shopping season, coinciding with the theatrical release of Home Alone 2. Tiger spokeswoman Robin Plous said, "sales weren't very good because the product couldn't do everything it did in the film".

Complicating matters for Tiger, the company heard from retailer Toys "R" Us that many parents were complaining about their kids finding coarse language recorded on their newly purchased Talkboys. Although the cassette tape that was included with each unit was initially blank, the toy's packaging featured a "try me" element that allowed recording in stores but was being abused. To address the complaints, Tiger altered the packaging to prevent people from recording without first purchasing the toy. Even despite the changes, the issue persisted as some consumers purchased the toy, recorded profanities, and then returned it to stores where it was resold.

== Deluxe Talkboy and Talkgirl ==
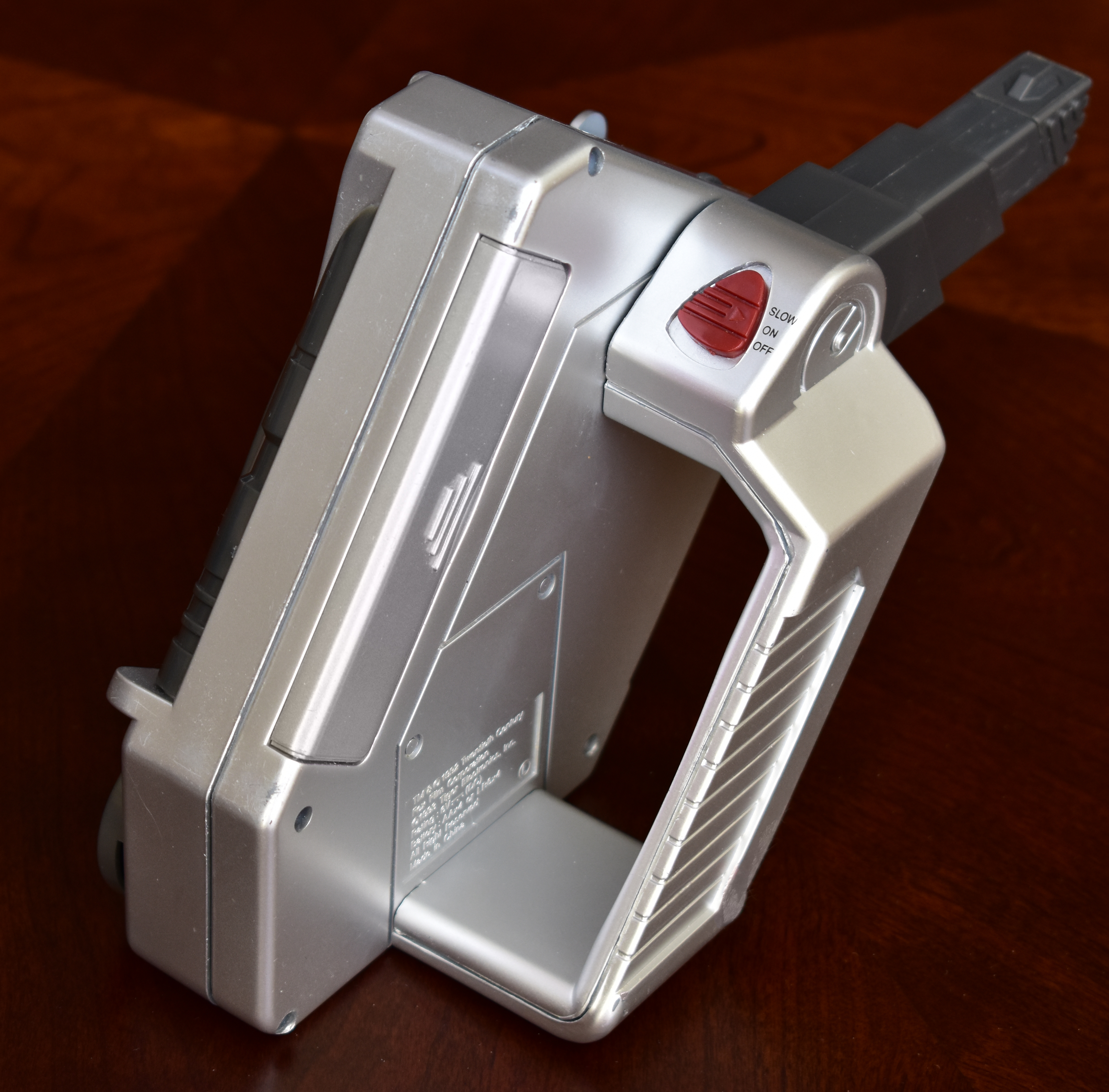
Reverse side of Deluxe Talkboy, showing the grip handle and variable-speed voice changer (red switch)

Tiger created a second model of the cassette player and recorder, the Deluxe Talkboy, which added the variable-speed voice changer. Audio can be sped up by recording on the "slow" setting and playing it back on the normal setting, or slowed down by recording on the normal setting and playing it back on the "slow" setting. The toy was released in April 1993 for US$29.99, and was sold at 11 retailers: Caldor, FAO Schwarz, Fingerhut, Hills, Kay Bee Toys, Kmart, Musicland, Service Merchandise, Target, Toys "R" Us, and Wal-Mart.

The Deluxe Talkboy was a sleeper hit, catching many retailers off-guard with its popularity during the 1993 holiday shopping season. Tiger spokesman Marc J. Rosenberg said that retailers at the American International Toy Fair earlier that February had not predicted such high consumer demand, placing orders that were 300 to 400 percent below what demand actually turned out to be; only Toys "R" Us had ordered enough units, according to Shiffman. Tiger did not anticipate high demand for a second-season product, and manufactured only as many units as retailers had ordered. Interest in Talkboy grew after the July 27 release of Home Alone 2 on VHS, which included an advertising insert that confirmed the toy was a real product; 10 million copies of the movie sold by December. Sales of Talkboy continued to increase as the result of a cross-promotion with Life cereal that advertised the toy and the Home Alone 2 video cassette on the side panel of cereal boxes.

Tiger relied on the Home Alone 2 movie tie-in and the advertising insert in home copies to promote the toy. Once demand surged, retailers tried to increase their orders, but Tiger found itself with insufficient time to produce enough units. On Black Friday, one store sold out of 288 Talkboys within half a day. Ultimately, Tiger was forced to pull all television commercials for the toy after Thanksgiving. Rosenberg said this was done "because [they] didn't want to deceive anyone" about the product's availability. Exact sales figures were not released, but Tiger spokespeople said in December that it had sold "hundreds of thousands" of Talkboys while facing demand for around 2 million units.

By mid-December, the company's telephone switchboard was handling more than 500 calls per day regarding the toy. Tiger employees recounted stories of the tactics that desperate callers resorted to. One person claimed to have a terminally ill child who needed a Talkboy, while another claimed to be from NBC News. One caller claimed to represent Rolling Stones guitarist Keith Richards and said he needed four Talkboys; after consulting Tiger's lawyers, Rosenberg agreed to accommodate him in exchange for autographed CDs. Other callers tried to bribe Tiger employees or said they were willing to fly anywhere in the United States to purchase ten Talkboys. Shiffman said, "There is not a story we haven't heard".

Target reportedly ceased issuing rain checks for Talkboys after receiving more than 20,000 requests from customers. By mid-December, the retailer had been out of stock of the toy for a "couple of weeks" and confirmed any additional shipments would not go onto store shelves due to their commitment to fulfill rain checks. Eighteen days before Christmas, one Toys "R" Us store in Clinton Township, Michigan, had a waiting list of more than 500 people for the Talkboy. Rosenberg said that special security agents were required to meet each of Tiger's air shipments arriving from Asia for protection. The company's manufacturing plants in Hong Kong were running 24 hours a day to produce Talkboys in an attempt to keep up with demand, and daily air shipments were being delivered overnight across the United States. Only three stores – Toys "R" Us, Kmart, and Wal-Mart – were scheduled to receive shipments the week before Christmas. Tiger said it would continue shipping Talkboys past New Year's Day. Rosenberg blamed the frenzied demand for Talkboys on retailers shifting away from the inventory practice of stockpiling, while the St. Petersburg Times faulted the burgeoning "just-in-time" delivery model through which stores used computer-based delivery systems to handle advance ordering.

In December 1993, Rosenberg said that Tiger anticipated "high demand for [the Deluxe Talkboy] going all the way through [1994]", and predicted that 20th Century Fox releasing Home Alone 2 for television broadcasts "would spur demand all over again". The Deluxe Talkboy was popular once again during the 1994 holiday shopping season, with many media outlets reporting it as one of the hottest-selling toys. Tiger said in November 1994 that it expected the Deluxe Talkboy to sell out for a second consecutive year. Kmart and Target stores reported swift sales around Thanksgiving, with one Target location in Fort Myers, Florida, selling out of the toy on Black Friday within an hour of their 7 a.m. opening. Wal-Mart indicated in mid-December that it was experiencing extended shortages of the toy. Within the last two weeks of the shopping season, Michelle Healy of Gannett News Service said the Deluxe Talkboy was "almost impossible to find". Roger Goddu of Toys "R" Us called it "without question the single most surprising item in our entire inventory".

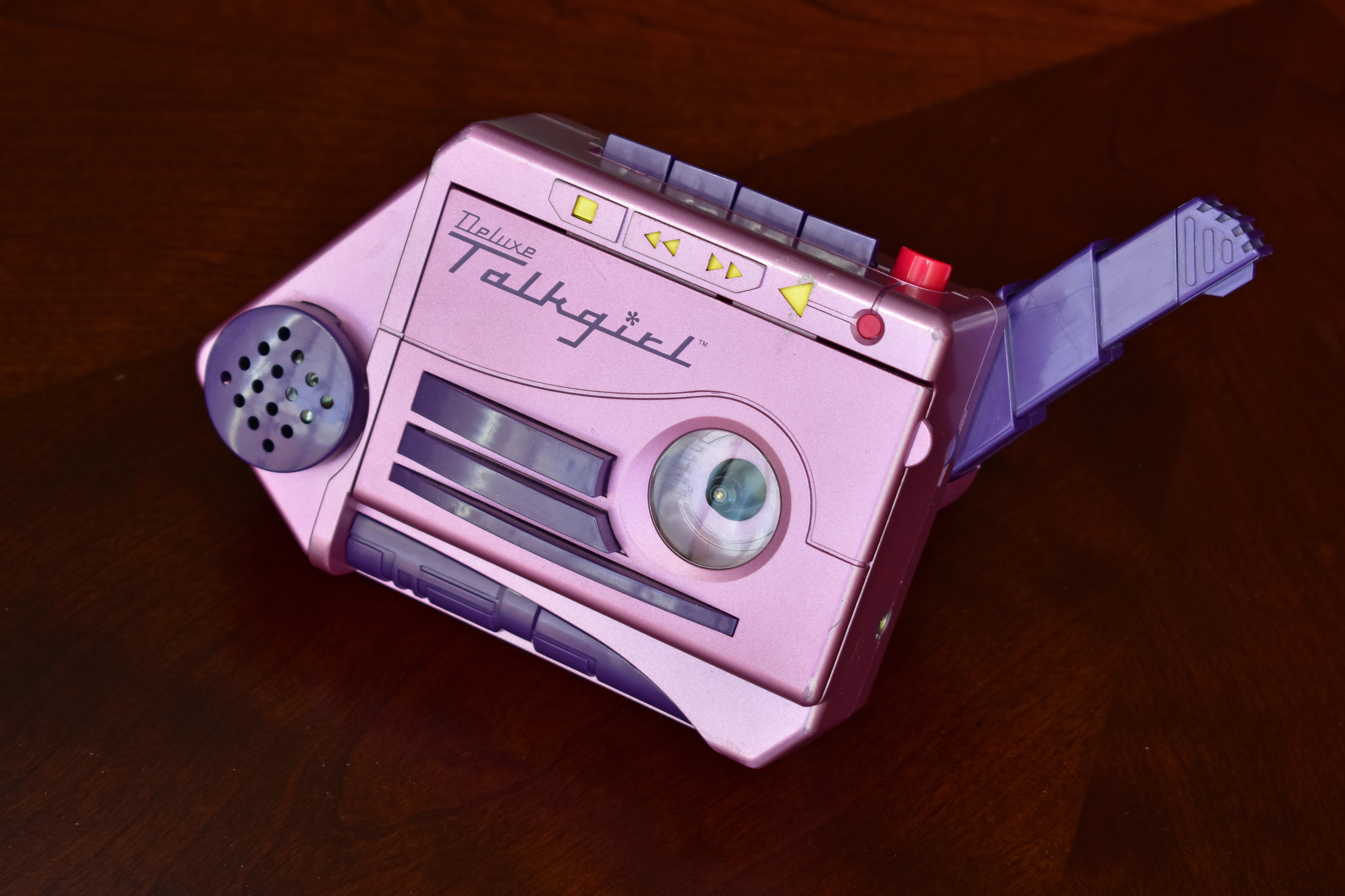
A Deluxe Talkgirl, a pink Deluxe Talkboy marketed to girls

In 1995, Tiger released the Deluxe Talkgirl, a pink Deluxe Talkboy that was marketed to girls. Shiffman said, "We think the [Talkboy] name may have prevented us from reaching the full market".

The Talkboy cassette recorder was popular again in 1996, with Playthings listing it as a "standout" on its survey of the year's most popular toys. It continued to sell well into the 1997 holiday shopping season, according to The Morning Call. Speaking about the Talkboy's staying power, Chris Byrne, editor of Market Focus: Toys, said that it sold "phenomenally well because it's a good toy".

== Talkboy F/X+ and Talkgirl F/X+ ==
The success of the Talkboy cassette recorders spawned a product line of electronic toys. In 1995, Tiger released the Talkboy F/X+ and Talkgirl F/X+, which are writing pens with a 12-second recorder, three-speed playback, and six buttons that play sound effects. Designed by Ralph Osterhout for Tiger, the toy combined solid-state storage and a voice-recording computer chip into the form factor of a pen. Shiffman called it a "breakthrough product in the industry" for making digital recording technology available in a low-cost toy. The technology for altering voice pitch and modulation was licensed from its developer Janese Swanson. The product retailed for $20 and sold a million units in 45 days. A poll conducted by Arthur Andersen LLP found the Talkboy F/X+ pen to be one of the most popular toys among shoppers during Thanksgiving weekend in 1995. In March 1997, Tiger began a year-long promotion with Nabisco to place offers for Talkboy F/X+ toys on 30 million packages of Oreos, Chips Ahoy!, Nutter Butters, and Ritz Bits, along with a million-dollar television advertisement campaign.

== Other products ==
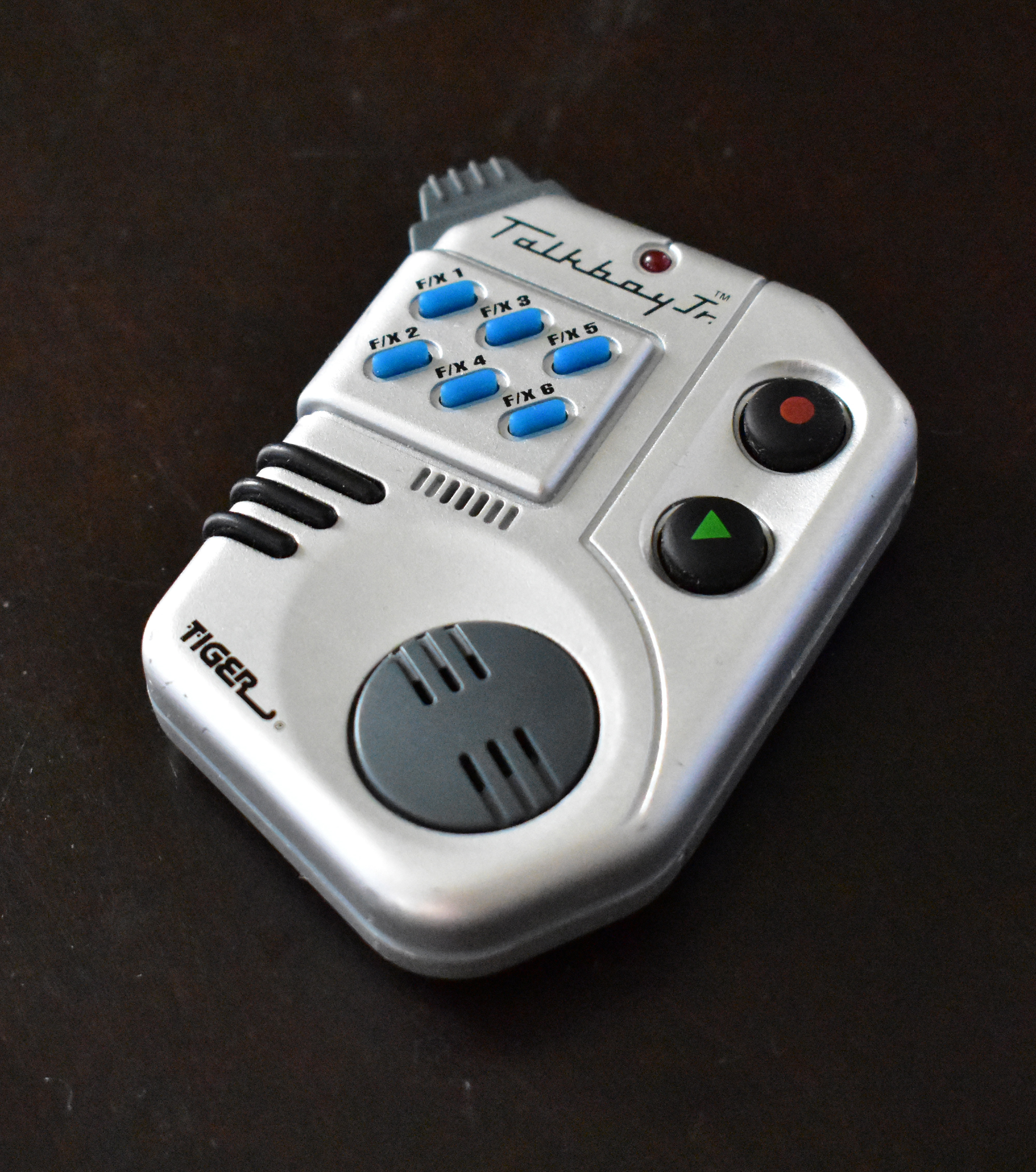
A Talkboy Jr.

- Talkboy Jr. and Talkgirl Jr., a handheld recorder with a voice changer and sound effects.
- Talkboy Keyz F/X and Talkgirl Keyz F/X
- Talkboy Shock Rocker
- Talkboy Scrambler
- Talkboy Way Cool Sounds
- Talkboy Sound Squisher
- Talkboy F/X+ Phone, a telephone with a voice changer, three sound effects, and eavesdropping detection. It was released in 1997 for US$25.
- Talkboy F/X Drummer, a pen that can be used for air drumming. It was available in 1997.
- Talkboy Tuned Out, a portable FM radio
- Talkboy Walkie Talkie, a walkie-talkie
- Talkboy Cool Talk and Talkgirl Cool Talk, a writing pen with a recorder
- Talkboy Tic Talker, a digital watch with a six-second recorder, voice changer, and sound effects. It was available in 1998.
- Talkboy Blabber Mouth, a pen with an animatronic head on top whose mouth moves to "lip sync" with recording playback

== Discontinuation and legacy ==
The trademark for the Talkboy brand was allowed to lapse in 1999, nearly a year after Tiger Electronics was acquired by Hasbro.

Due to his involvement in the toy's creation, Rosenberg acquired the nickname "Talkboy" within the toy industry, and had a personalized license plate created reading the same.

Several media outlets acknowledged the Talkboy on lists of the most popular holiday toys and past toy crazes, including USA Today, Metro, Statesman Journal, Livingly.com, Rakuten, SILive.com, and CNN.com. Talkboy was ranked by Thrillist as the 38th-greatest movie prop of all time. Complex ranked it 75th on its list of the 90 best gadgets of the 1990s, while ABC News included it on a similar list of tech toys from the decade.

== See also ==
- Walkman
- Yak Bak, a competing voice recorder toy which shared the same licensed technology as the Talkboy F/X+
