= Voice changer =

Hardware device or software which changes the pitch or timbre of the user's voice

A voice changer (also known as voice enhancer) is a device which changes the tone or pitch of or adds distortion to the user's voice, or a combination and vary greatly in price and sophistication.

== Hardware implementations ==
The earliest voice changers were electronic devices usually used over the telephone for the purpose of disguise. There are low-priced, small lithium battery-powered voice changers that are used between a phone's mouthpiece and the user's mouth.

More sophisticated voice changers have different levels of various distortion effects variable by faders.

== Software implementations ==
Nowadays, software implementations are very common. There is a plethora of techniques that modify the voice by using different algorithms. Most algorithms modify the voice by changing the amplitude, pitch and tone of the voice. The pitch plays an important role from changing a male voice into a female voice, and vice versa. The results of voice changing through software are quite impressive and satisfactory.

"Voice cloning" software can mimic the sound of a specific person's voice based on recordings of that voice.

== Appearances in media ==
- Voice changers can be seen in various movies, including Scream, Saw, Super Troopers, Steel and a Talkboy voice changer was used in Home Alone 2: Lost in New York.
- Current affairs television shows and documentaries will sometimes employ the use of voice changers to disguise the voice of someone who wants to remain anonymous.
- In the anime/manga series, Death Note, the mysterious detective, named "L", uses voice distortion when talking through his computer, to his boss, Giovanni, used a voice changer until the end of the original series. It distorted his voice, making him sound like a robot.
- Conan Edogawa, the main protagonist of the anime/manga series Detective Conan uses a bowtie-shaped voice changer. By turning a dial on its back, he is able to imitate all kinds of voices that he hears.
- In the tutorial mission of the video game, Saints Row: The Third, Johnny Gat, Shaundi, Nyte Blade, and The Protagonist all use voice changers during a bank robbery.
- Jason Hudson uses one in Call of Duty: Black Ops when interrogating Alex Mason.
- Clara Lille uses a voice distorter when talking with Aiden Pearce on her phone in the video game Watch Dogs until they meet face-to-face.
- Some superheroes use voice changers, either to disguise themselves or intimidate their opponents:
  - In the live-action TV series Arrow, Oliver Queen, when communicating under disguise as "the Arrow", uses a voice changer.
  - In the film Batman v Superman: Dawn of Justice, Bruce Wayne uses it to disguise his voice and to inflict fear into criminals.
  - In the film Spider-Man: Homecoming, a voice changer is activated when Spider-Man turns on his Tech Suit's interrogation mode, making him speak in a deep, frightening voice to a potential suspect.
  - For The Incredible Hulk, his voice is lowered in the pitch and sounds raw, becoming a inhuman. In those films The Incredible Hulk, The Avengers and Avengers: Age of Ultron, When Hulk Roaring and Growling, the voice combining with those voices actors who are uncredited and the animals sounds effects. In Thor: Ragnarok, Hulk's voice was blended by Mark Ruffalo's vocal performance and Hulk's signature Growling to produce the “auto-tune” artifacts when used aggressively.
- In the animated TV series Star Wars Rebels, the Rebel Alliance's Fulcrum agents use voice changers to disguise their identities.
- A Coca-Cola commercial starring Mindy Kaling also features a person who has a disguised voice and appearance to remain anonymous.
- In Grand Theft Auto: San Andreas, Mike Toreno uses voice changers when calling CJ.
- In the Spanish heist TV series Money Heist the leader of the robbers, the Professor, frequently uses a voice changer to talk to the police.
- In the Rugrats episode "Angelica Orders Out", Angelica uses Stu's voice changer, which makes her sound like her mother, to call a deli to order dessert and to call all of the kids' parents to go to her fake surprise party.
