= Oosterhout (disambiguation) =

Oosterhout is a municipality in the province North Brabant in the Netherlands.

Oosterhout may also refer to:

== Places ==
- Oosterhout, a hamlet in the municipality of Overbetuwe in the Netherlands
- Oosterhout Abbey, St. Paul's Abbey in Oosterhout
- Oosterhout Formation, in the central and south area of the Netherlands

== People ==
- Chimène van Oosterhout (born 1964), Dutch TV personality, actress, and singer
- Martin Donald Van Oosterhout (1900–1979), American legislator and state court judge
- Pim van Boetzelaer van Oosterhout (1892–1986), Dutch diplomat and politician

== See also ==
- Osterhout
- Ousterhout
