= Edwin James (scientist) =

American scientist and medical practitioner (1797–1861)

Edwin P. James
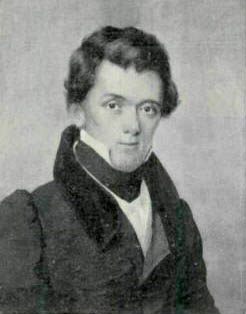
- Born: August 27, 1797; Weybridge, Vermont, United States
- Died: October 28, 1861 (aged 64); Burlington, Iowa, United States
- Education: Middlebury College
- Spouse: Clara Rogers
- Scientific career
- Fields: Botany, Geology
- Author abbrev. (botany): E.James

Edwin P. James (August 27, 1797 – October 28, 1861), a 19th-century American botanist, geologist, linguist, and medical practitioner, was an important figure in the early exploration of the American West. James was also known for his time spent creating relationships with Native Americans in the United States, and also aiding African Americans to escape slavery.

James is primarily remembered for his participation in the expedition of 1820 led by Major Stephen Harriman Long, into still largely unknown territory acquired in the Louisiana Purchase. James served during the expedition's more productive second year. That expedition "was the first scientific survey of the region and dramatically increased the country’s geographical knowledge of the West." James was primarily responsible for producing the report, Account of an Expedition from Pittsburgh to the Rocky Mountains, Performed in the Years 1819, 1820, published in 1823.

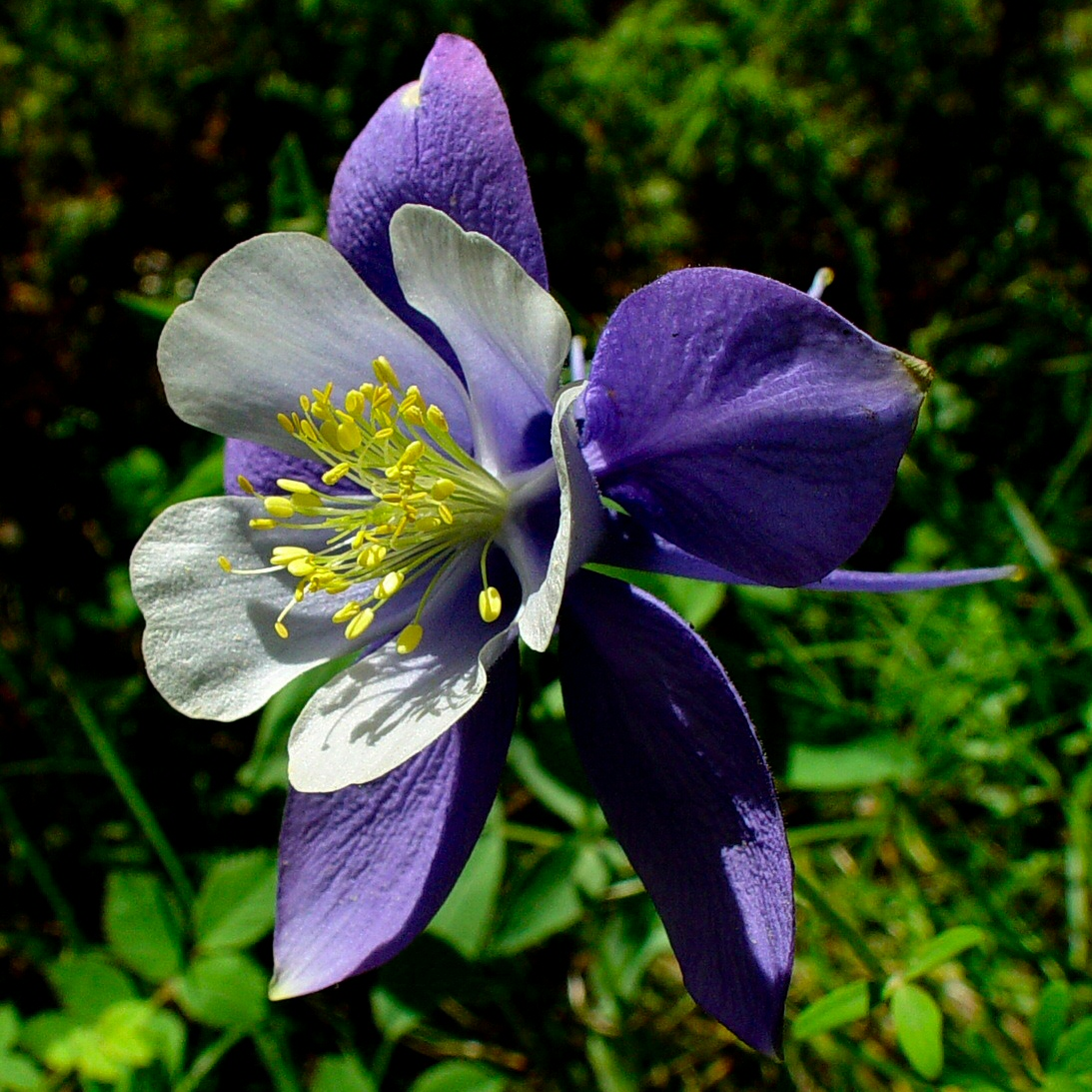
Colorado Blue Columbine (Aquilegia coerulea) E.James

During the expedition, James accomplished the first recorded mountain ascent in North America to over 14,000 ft. elevation, and was the first to collect many alpine plant species, including what he called "the mountain Columbine" Aquilegia coerulea, later to become the state flower of Colorado, now with the common name Colorado Blue Columbine.

The expedition's extensive collection of information on flora, fauna, geology and geography, as recounted in James' Account, is reminiscent of the efforts, just two decades earlier, by Alexander von Humboldt in Central and South America. A copy of Humboldt's Personal Narrative of Travels of the Equinocial Regions of the New Continent was carried by the Long expedition.

The Account influenced the literature of the Far West. Historian William H. Goetzmann suggested "the most important literary event of 1823 was the publication of Dr. Edwin James's Account of an Expedition." In a more recent homage to James, Lyndgaard said: "The passages that deal with landscape description, bison, and Native Americans, especially the Pawnee, were immediately recognized for their quality, and were thus mined by novelists as well as celebrated by reviewers."

== Early life and education ==
Born in Weybridge, Vermont, to Mary (Emmes) and Daniel James, a deacon. The youngest child, he grew up in a log house set among wooded hills. James inherited several of his father's traits. He was thoughtful, studious, and had "untiring perseverance". He was "accustomed to cull treasures of rich thought from works of nature and a wide range of readings."

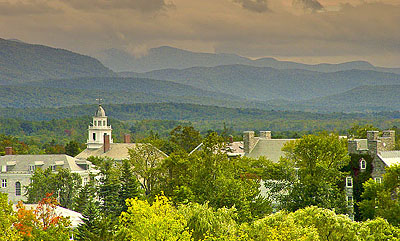
Old Chapel of Middlebury College with the Green Mountains in the distance

James prepared for college at Addison County Grammar School. He often walked the five miles to Middlebury College, which he began attending in 1812. After receiving his A.B. in 1816, James moved to Albany, New York, to continue study in medicine (with his physician brother), botany with John Torrey, and botany and geology with Amos Eaton. In 1819 James became a part of the American Geological Society and within one year had authored articles on the subject. Within this same time frame he also prepared the first list of Vermont plants.

== Expedition to the Rocky Mountains ==
The second year of the Long Expedition began June 6, 1820 when the members, now including 22-year-old Edwin James, left the overwintering camp, Engineer Cantonment, near the eastern border of the current state of Nebraska. They headed west toward the Rockies, following, for the most part, the Platte River, then south along the Rocky Mountain Front Range, before heading east toward the expedition's ending location (which occurred on September 13, 1820) at Fort Smith, in what is now western Arkansas.

On July 13, James and two others set out to climb Pikes Peak. As James writes in his Account:

On the morning of the 14th... we continued the ascent, hoping to be able to reach the summit of the Peak, and return to the same camp in the evening... A little above the point where the timber disappears entirely, commences a region of astonishing beauty... covered with a carpet of low but brilliantly flowering alpine plants... We now found it would be impossible to reach the summit of the mountain, and return to our camp of the preceding night, during that part of the day which remained; but as we could not persuade ourselves to turn back, after having so nearly accomplished the ascent, we resolved to take our chance of spending the night, on whatever part of the mountain, it might overtake us... We met, as we proceeded, such numbers of unknown and interesting plants, as to occasion much delay in collecting, and were under the disagreeable necessity of passing by numbers which we saw in situations difficult of access.

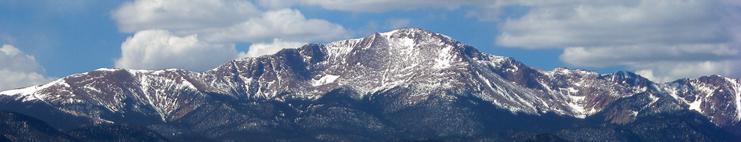
Panorama of Pikes Peak, above the timber line and in the alpine tundra, the highest climate zone (habitat) of the mountain, where it can be cold enough to snow on some summer days

Historian Roger Lawrence Williams used the phrase "a region of astonishing beauty", from the above, for the title of his 2003 book on Rocky Mountains botanical history. After reaching the Peak, James describes the natural history of the summit, and goes on to describe the view in all directions in some detail, including smoke in a valley to the north "supposed to indicate the encampment of a party of Indians."

It was the first time in recorded history that a mountain of such height (4,302 m/14,115 feet) had been scaled in North America by a white man. (In South America, Alexander von Humboldt reached around 5,800 m / 19,000 ft on Mt. Chimborazo in 1802.) For a time, the mountain was called "James Peak". In a commemoration 100 years later, the day was considered as "undoubtedly the most notable day of the expedition for botanical collecting" by George Everett Osterhout, a prominent Colorado botanist.

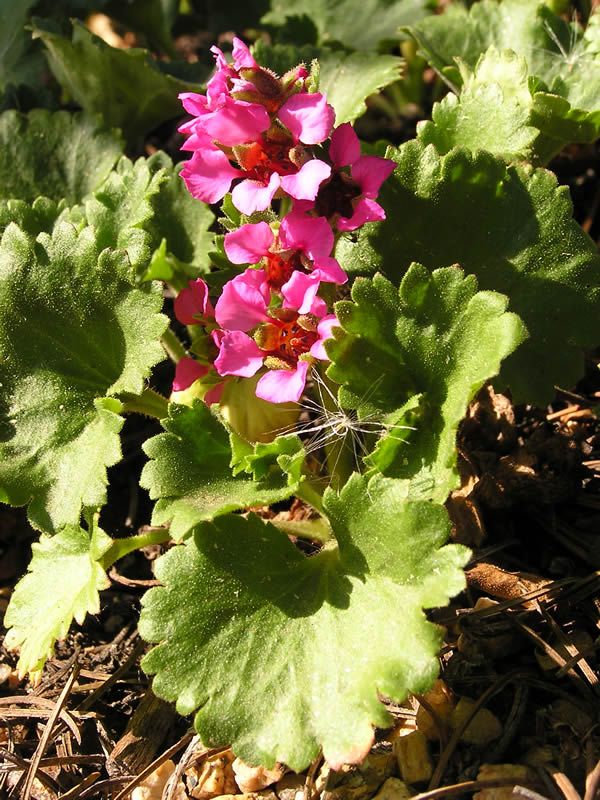
James' Telesonix (Telesonix jamesii) (Torr.) Raf.

Due to traversing a largely uncharted country, it was not always clear from James' journal exactly where each camp and collecting site was. The expedition's path was retraced 170 years later, using James' diary and scenic paintings of the expedition's artist, Samuel Seymour. In spite of considerable change over the years, sites were located with accuracy.

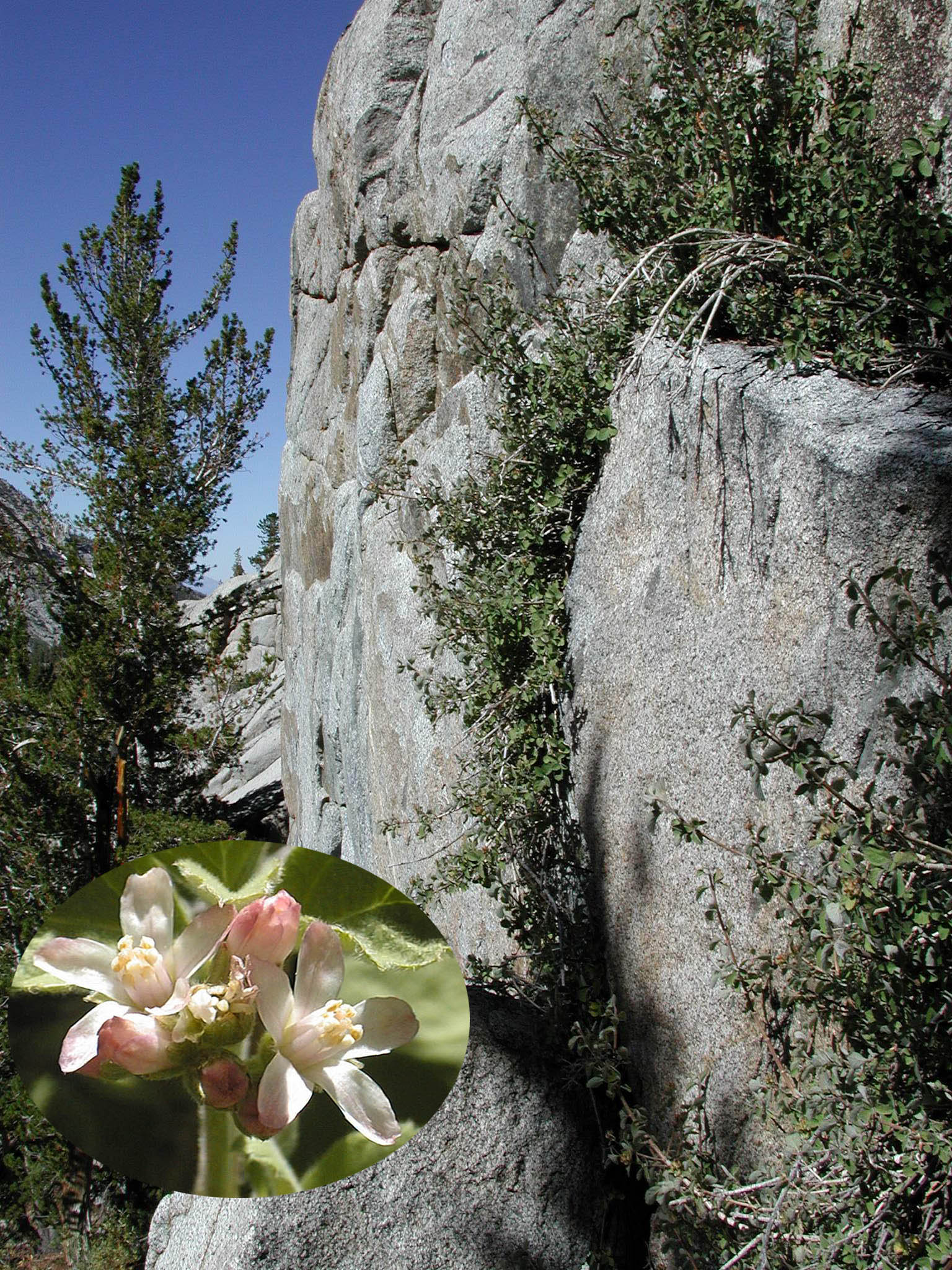
Cliffbush (Jamesia americana) Torr. & A.Gray var. rosea

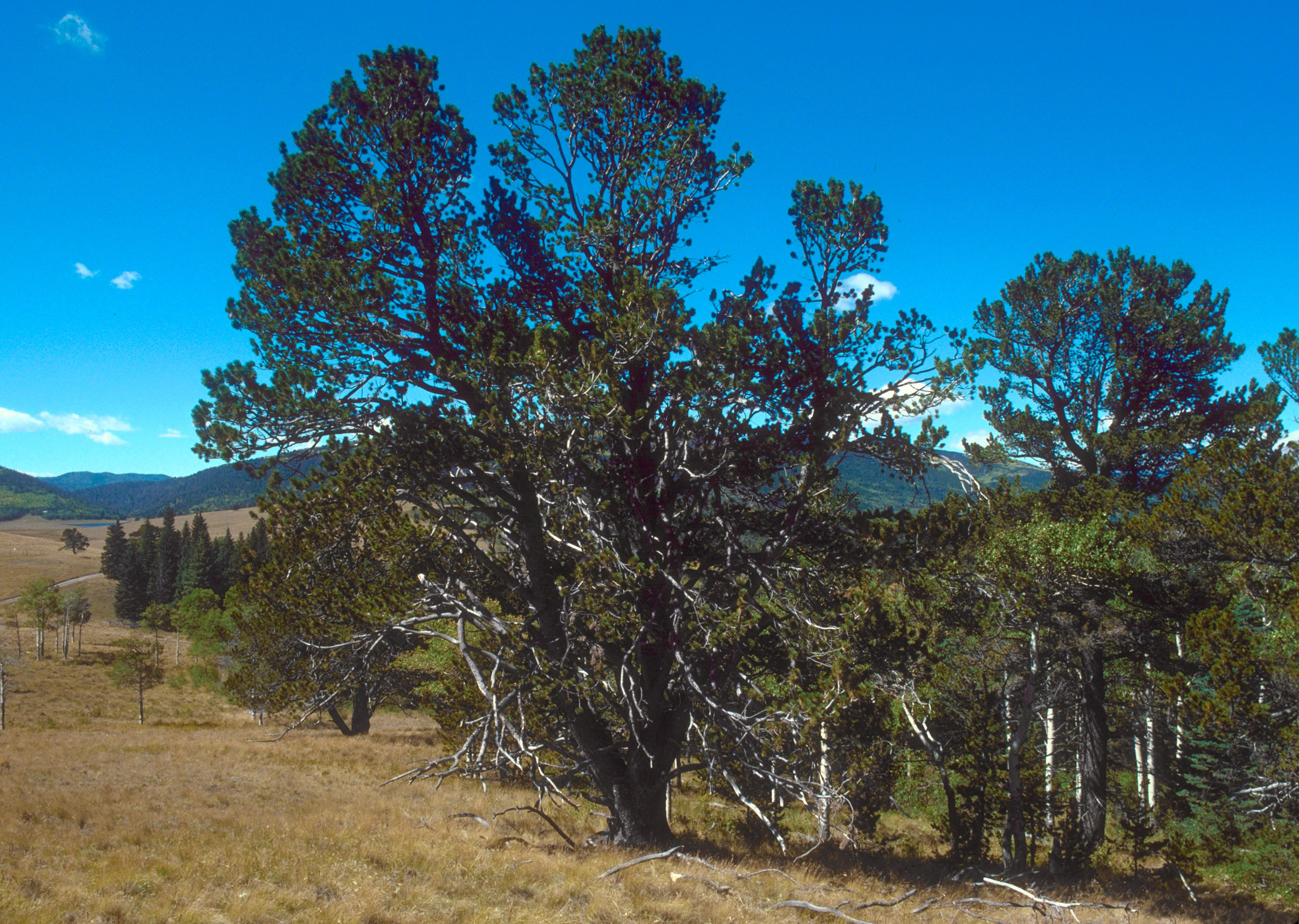
Limber Pine (Pinus flexilis) E.James, USDA

During the Expedition James collected around 700 plant species in the mountains and over the prairies, of which 140 were new to science. In addition to Aquilegia coerulea, James named many other species (e.g., Limber Pine, Pinus flexilis E.James), and many were later named after him by John Torrey (notably the Cliffbush, Jamesia americana Torr & A.Gray, often found at high elevations growing in cracks in vertical rock surfaces), and by others who worked on his collections (e.g., Telesonix jamesii (Torr.) Raf.). All in all, 24 plant species were named in James' honor.

In his 1920 100 year anniversary commemoration, Osterhout noted: "In general the native plants still grow and blossom as they did when Dr. James saw them in 1820; but a great change has been wrought in the country. Fruitful farms have replaced much of what seemed to be sterile soil, and towns and cities and a busy industry have come to their silent and uninhabited plains and hills."

After completing the expedition, most members went, by various routes, back to the East Coast. Most (especially James) suffered from malaria, which delayed returning. James did not get to Philadelphia, the meeting place, until the autumn of 1821. James was assigned the primary responsibility (with collaboration by Long and Say) of writing the Account 's narrative, to append the collected data, and to prepare the results for publication, a job completed near the end of 1822. The James Peak Wilderness and its summit in Colorado were named for James.

== Army surgeon ==
Subsequently, James was appointed US Army surgeon to serve at various frontier outposts including the Great Lakes region; he served from 1823 to 1833.

== Native American subagent and linguist ==
While, with the Army he interacted with Native Americans, most notably the Ojibwe with whose language he became familiar. A Euro-American, John Tanner, captured by the Ojibwe as a child and raised among them, worked closely with James in the production of the New Testament in the Ojibwe language and in the telling of Tanner's life story. He also observed the use of Broken Oghibbeway and gave the pidgin its name.

Edwin was an Indian subagent to the Potawatomi in Bellevue, Nebraska, where he created grade-school spellers for the children's education.

== Personal life and career in Iowa ==
In 1827, while still working for the Army but during a return visit to the East, James married Clara Rogers, who was describes as a beautiful woman "of talent and fond of society". They had one child, a son named Edwin Jr., born in 1828. He was elected to the American Philosophical Society in 1833.

In 1836, James established a medical practice, he built a large stone house four miles west of Burlington, Iowa in Union Township, and established a productive farm. There James maintained, in his house, a station on the Underground Railroad. He hid escaped enslaved people in baskets, barrels, and sacks. He built a secret room in his house behind a fireplace. James helped fugitives travel north along the Underground Railroad. The Fugitive Slave Act of 1850 required people in free states to return runaway people back to slavery, but James was against the law. James picked up a black man who had stayed at the Western Hotel in his farm wagon. Two bounty hunters from Missouri, a slave state, came to town in search of a man named Dick who escaped from a farm in Clark County. It was assumed that the man would be sent to Missouri, but it was determined that he was not the man from Clark County, so he was released to travel along the Underground Railroad, at the cheers of James' neighbors. Although now openly known as an abolitionist and Underground Railroad operative, James continued to assist runaways throughout his life.

Clara died in 1854, leaving James in great sorrow. James himself died in 1861, when he was crushed after falling under the wheels of his wagon while loading firewood. Both of them were buried in the Rock Spring Cemetery. Years later, Rocky Mountain Blue Columbine were planted around his grave by the Des Moines County Medical Society.

== Works ==
- James, Edwin (1823, Philadelphia edition). Account of an Expedition from Pittsburgh to the Rocky Mountains, Performed in the Years 1819 and '20. Vol. I. 1823.
- James, Edwin (1823, Philadelphia edition) . Account of an Expedition from Pittsburgh to the Rocky Mountains, Performed in the Years 1819 and '20. Vol. II. 1823.
- James, Edwin (1823, London edition). Account of an Expedition from Pittsburgh to the Rocky Mountains, Performed in the Years 1819, 1820. May 13, 2010. in three volumes.
- James, Edwin (1825). "Catalogue of Plants collected during a Journey to and from the Rocky Mountains during the summer of 1820". Transactions of the American Philosophical Society. 2: 172–190. doi:10.2307/1005058. JSTOR 1005058.
- James, Edwin (1825). "Remarks on the Sandstone and Fletz Trap Formations of the Western Part of the Valley of the Mississippi". Transactions of the American Philosophical Society. 2: 191–215. doi:10.2307/1005059. JSTOR 1005059.
- James, Edwin (ed). (1830) A narrative of the captivity and adventures of John Tanner, (U.S. interpreter at the Saut de Ste. Marie,): during thirty years residence among the Indians in the interior of North America (PDF). Archived from the original (PDF) on May 9, 2015.
- James, Edwin, with John Tanner. (1833) Translation of New Testament into the Ojibwa language. Albany, Packard and Van Benthuysen, printers. 1833.
