= Yak Bak =

Voice recorder toy

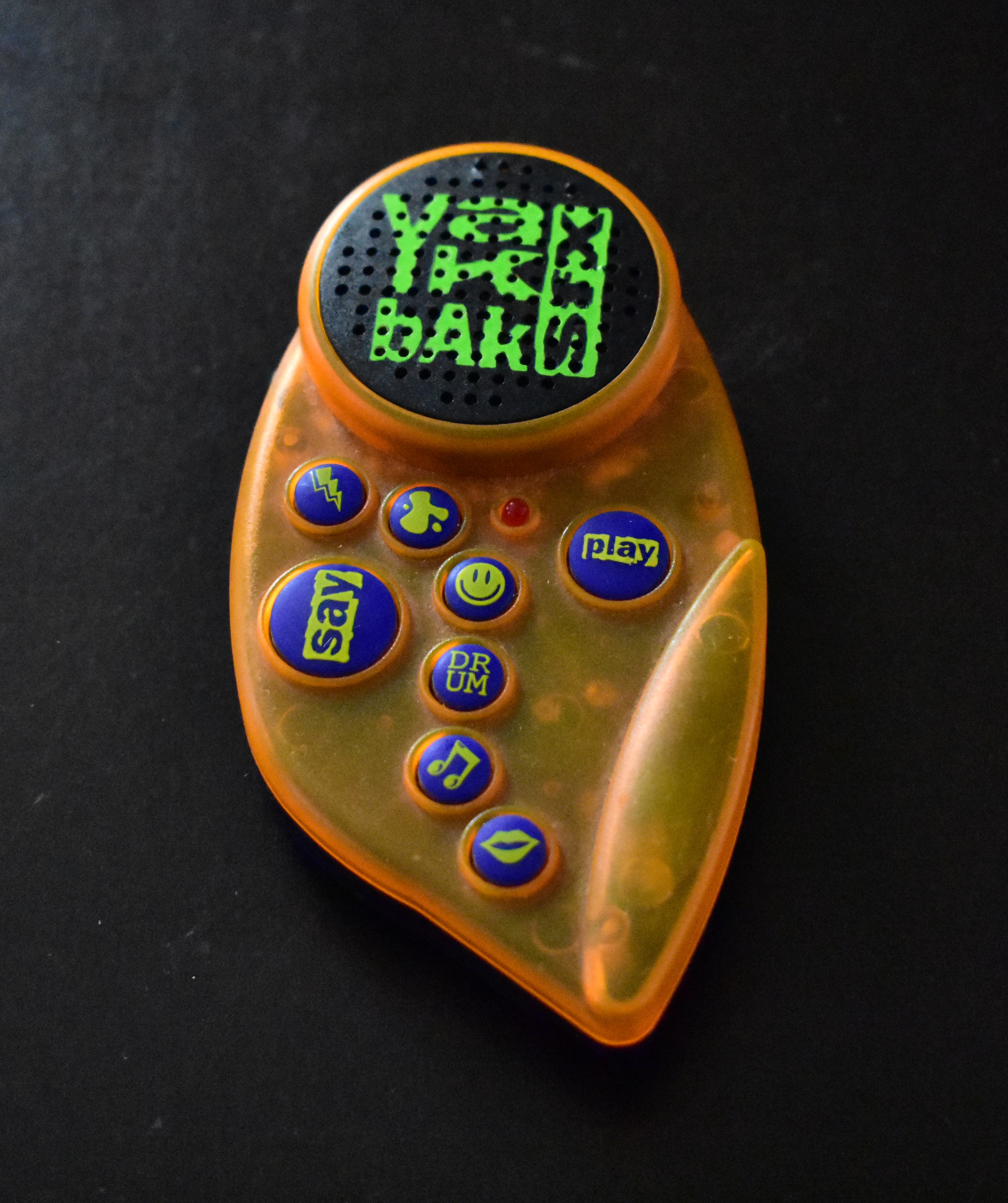
A Yak Bak SFX

Yak Bak was a line of handheld electronic voice recorder toys developed by Ralph Osterhout at Team Machina for Yes! Gear (a.k.a. Yes! Entertainment) in the mid-to-late 1990s. Several versions of the toy were developed, including the Yak Bak, Yak Bak 2, Yak Bak 2k, Yak Bak WarpR, Yak Wakky, Yak Bak SFX, and the Yak Bakwards. Some of these models also came in pen form as part of the "Power Penz" series. The Yak Bak was intended to be a compact, more affordable competitor to the Talkboy introduced by Tiger Electronics in 1992.

== History ==
In December 1994, YES! launched its YES! Gear product line with the introduction of Yak Bak, a simple device consisting of a single speaker and two buttons. One button was marked "Say" and the other, "Play." By holding down the "Say" button, a person could record six seconds of sound, during which a light would shine to indicate that the Yak Bak was recording. Afterwards, the "Play" button would enable the person to hear what was just recorded. This was the basic premise for all subsequent models of the toy, each one adding a slight variance to the original. The television commercial for it showed a boy sitting in a living room recliner while his sister came by and started fussing at him. Then he kept playing his "Is not!" quote using the Yak Bak at his sister, while his sister kept saying "Is too!".

Following encouraging sales of its 1995 line of miniature recorders, YES! introduced four new Yak Bak products for 1996 and lowered the products' prices to a more affordable range. The original Yak Bak would be re-released in 1997 as Yak Bak Classic and again in 2000 as Yak Bak 2k.

== Yak Bak 2 ==
This was identical to the original, but added a locking mechanism which prevented the user from accidentally hitting the "Say" button and thereby erasing the stored recording. This locking mechanism became a staple of some of the future models. The most notable function of this version is the WarpR, which changes the pitch of the recording. Later models of this series had incorporated the WarpR design and function. It came in many colors. One of the toys of the year during the Sixth Annual CBS This Morning Toy Test and the Seventh Annual Sesame Street Parents' Toy Test.

== Yak Bak 2k ==
To cash in on the hysteria regarding the turn of the millennium, the Yak Bak 2k was released.

== Yak Bak WarpR ==
The Yak Bak WarpR provided users with the ability to alter the recording via a pitch dial that would speed up or slow down the sound, thereby making the voice sound higher or deeper. This model was more popular than previous ones as the novelty of voice recording became more enticing once users could "warp" their voices. This "warping" option also became a staple of all future models. As was the case with the Yak Bak 2, the Yak Bak WarpR also contained a lockout mechanism which disabled the Say button.

== Yak Guard ==
The Yak Guard was a motion-triggered device capable of guarding rooms and belongings, or to "pull gags on friends and family members," as suggested in company advertisements. A personally recorded "alarm" could be placed on door knobs or drawers, for example, alerting the owner of trespass.

== Yak Time ==
The Yak Time was a combination of the original Yak Bak and a wrist watch.

== Yak Wakky ==
The Yak Wakky allowed users to change the pitch and speed of the recording by way of light sensitive sensors on the body of the device. When activated by a switch on the right hand side of the toy, the sensors would, depending on how much light shone on them, increase the pitch of the recording. By using the palm of his/her hand, the user could alter the pitch of the recordings dramatically.

== Yak Bak SFX ==
The Yak Bak SFX provided the same function as the Yak Bak WarpR but with additional buttons that added six sound effects before or after the recording.

== Yak Bakwards ==
Retail priced at $19.99, the Yak Bakwards was essentially the Yak Bak WarpR with an additional "Yalp" button. This button literally reversed the "Play" function, causing the recording to be reversed.

== Yak Bak Ball ==
Yak Bak Ball is in the shape of a small football. The user holds down the button and record; toss it and after catching it, squeezes or hit it and hear the message. The grips are designed to be easy to catch. It was made to get children active outdoors.

== Yak Maniak ==
The Yak Maniak allowed the user to alter the pitch of the recording as was the case with past models. It also included five sound effects, not too dissimilar to the previous Yak Baks, but the most notable difference between this model and others in the series were its three extra voice effects. The Yak Maniak enabled the user to cause their recordings to stutter, echo or warble. These effects were activated by a trigger on the left hand side of the toy. A three-position dial was turned either all the way to the right for stutter, to the central position for echo, or to the left for warble. During playback, the trigger had to be held down to activate the stutter, held down for a certain length of the recording then released to enable the echo or held down to activate the warble effect. Hitting play mid-way through the echo effect could delete the remainder of the recording.

== Yak Bak Power Penz ==
The Yak Bak Power Pens combined working ink pens with the Yak Bak toy. Marketed for children in school, the Power Penz came in both the Yak Write SFX and the Yak Bak 2 models. It was made to compete against the Talkboy FX Plus by Tiger Electronics.
