= George Everett Osterhout =

Botanist (1858–1937)

- Born: March 31, 1858; Tunkhannock, Pennsylvania
- Died: April 2, 1937 (aged 79); Windsor, Colorado
- Citizenship: United States
- Education: Lafayette College
- Known for: Field botany, plant taxonomy
- Spouse: Etta Thomas
- Scientific career
- Fields: Botany
- Author abbrev. (botany): Osterh.

George Everett Osterhout (March 31, 1858 – April 2, 1937) was an American businessman and botanist. A Pennsylvania native, he later moved to Colorado and became known for his research into the flora of the Rocky Mountains. The standard author abbreviation Osterh. is used to indicate this person as the author when citing a botanical name.

== Early life and education ==
Born in Tunkhannock, Pennsylvania, he later went to Easton, Pennsylvania, where he graduated from Lafayette College. After graduation he undertook studies in the law, and was admitted to the Pennsylvania bar.

== Career ==
In 1885, at age 27, he moved to Windsor, Colorado, either in search of better health, wrote Aven Nelson, or to pursue a strong desire to study Rocky Mountain plants, inspired by one of his college professors, according to Roger Lawrence Williams. He established a lumber business in Windsor, and resided there for the rest of his life, "where he was known as a successful business man, a kindly neighbor, a philanthropic Christian, a scientist of more than local renown." His strong avocation, collecting native plants of the Rocky Mountain region, began in 1893. He consulted with professional botanists, especially Aven Nelson of the University of Wyoming, and Per Axel Rydberg.

His personal herbarium grew to over 20,000 specimen sheets. Of these, 8,330 were of his own collections, and described by Roger Lawrence Williams as "testimony to leisure time arduously spent." The others Osterhout acquired via trading or purchase. Upon his death, all of his sheets were bequeathed to the Rocky Mountain Herbarium.

According to IPNI, his botanical author abbreviation, Osterh., is associated with 237 plant names or historical variations theron. His nomenclatural efforts appear within his 44 publications, as listed by Roger Williams, which also includes two essays on Rocky Mountain botanizing, one a commemoration of the 100th anniversary of the first major botanical exploration of the Rocky Mountains in 1820 (as described in an account by Edwin James).

== Plants named in Osterhout's honor ==
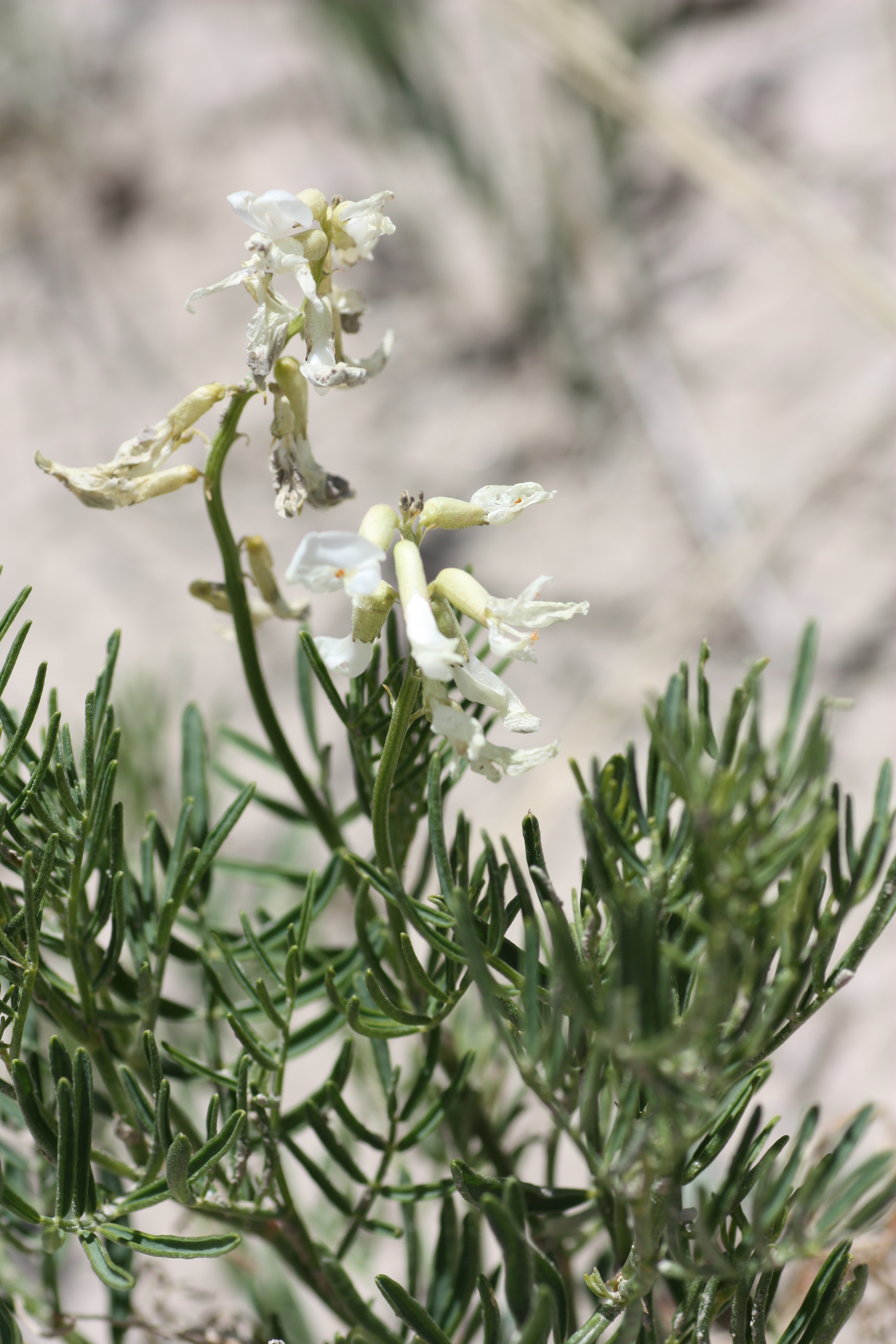
Osterhout's milk-vetch, Astragalus osterhoutii

According to ITIS (as of June 2018) these five plants are named in honor of George E. Osterhout:

- Astragalus osterhoutii M.E. Jones – Osterhout's milk-vetch
- Cirsium clavatum var. osterhoutii (Rydb.) D.J. Keil – Osterhout's thistle
- Cryptantha osterhoutii (Payson) Payson – Osterhout's catseye
- Penstemon osterhoutii Pennell – Osterhout's beardtongue
- Physaria floribunda ssp. osterhoutii (Payson) O'Kane – pointtip twinpod
