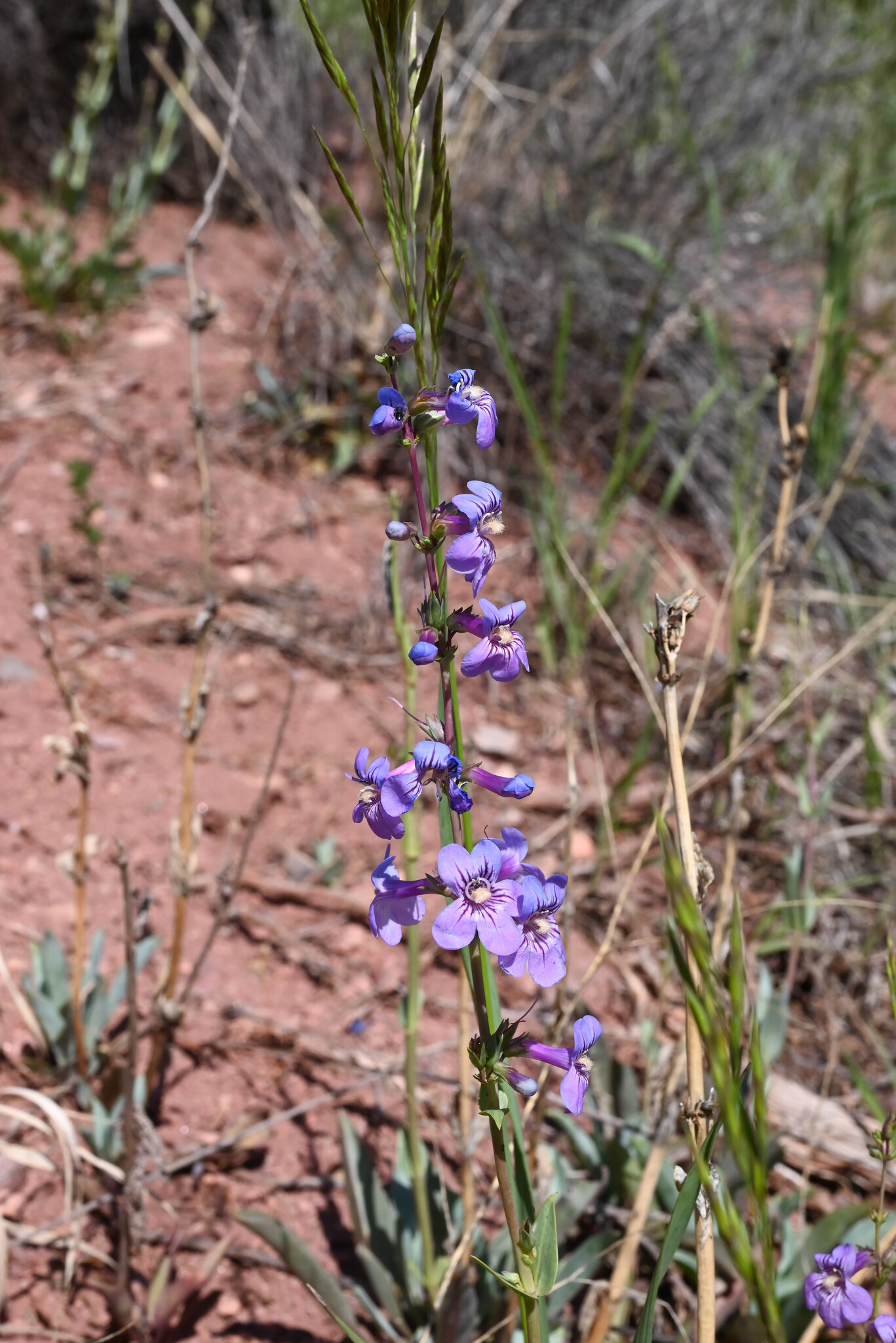
- Northwest of McCoy in Routt County, Colorado

Conservation status
- Apparently Secure (NatureServe)

Scientific classification
- Kingdom: Plantae
- Clade: Tracheophytes
- Clade: Angiosperms
- Clade: Eudicots
- Clade: Asterids
- Order: Lamiales
- Family: Plantaginaceae
- Genus: Penstemon
- Species: P. osterhoutii

Binomial name
- Penstemon osterhoutii Pennell

= Penstemon osterhoutii =

Plant species in the veronica family

Penstemon osterhoutii, commonly called Osterhout penstemon, is an herbaceous perennial of the veronica family that is only found in the state of Colorado in the western United States.

== Description ==
Osterhout penstemons have flowering stems that typically grow 26 to 77 centimeters (10–30 in), but are occasionally just 6 cm (2.4 in) tall. Each plant will have a few or just one stem which are fairly thick, hairless, and glaucous.

The flowers are funnel shaped, sky-blue to violet or lavender with red-violet floral guide lines.

== Taxonomy ==
Penstemon osterhoutii was scientifically described and named in 1920 by Francis W. Pennell. The species is part of the genus Penstemon which is classified in the Plantaginaceae family. It has no subspecies or botanical synonyms.

=== Names ===
The species name is in honor of George Everett Osterhout, an amateur botanist and businessperson in the lumber trade who lived in Colorado. It is similarly known by the common names Osterhout penstemon, Osterhout's penstemon, and Osterhout's beardtongue.

== Range and habitat ==
The Osterhout penstemon is endemic to northwestern Colorado. There is grows in Routt, Grand, Rio Blanco, Garfield, Eagle, Summit, and Pitkin counties. In the past some collections of thickleaf penstemons (Penstemon pachyphyllus var. pachyphyllus) from the eastern Uinta Basin were mistakenly identified as Osterhout penstemons.

== See also ==
- List of Penstemon species
