= Roger Williams and the All Mixed-Up Quartet =

American Christian rock band

Roger Williams & The All Mixed-Up Quartet (the AMUQ) are a Christian rock band based in Tennessee. They signed with Christian label Barner Records in 2010.

Current Members:

- Roger Williams (Vocals, Guitar)
- Andy Blanchard (Bass, Violin)
- James "Earl" Greene (Mandolin, Guitar)
- Will Carter (Electric Guitar)
- Ben Bolden (Drums)

Their first major release is titled A Different Road and was produced by Dove Award winning and Grammy nominated producer Travis Wyrick.

== Discography ==
- 6 Hearts, 12 Shoes, 1 King - (independent)
- These Are The Days, These Are The Times - (independent)
- 25 Paces - 2004 (independent)
- The Coffee House Collection - (independent)
- Out of the Way - (independent)
- Free - 2008 (independent)
- A Different Road - 2010 (Barner Records)
