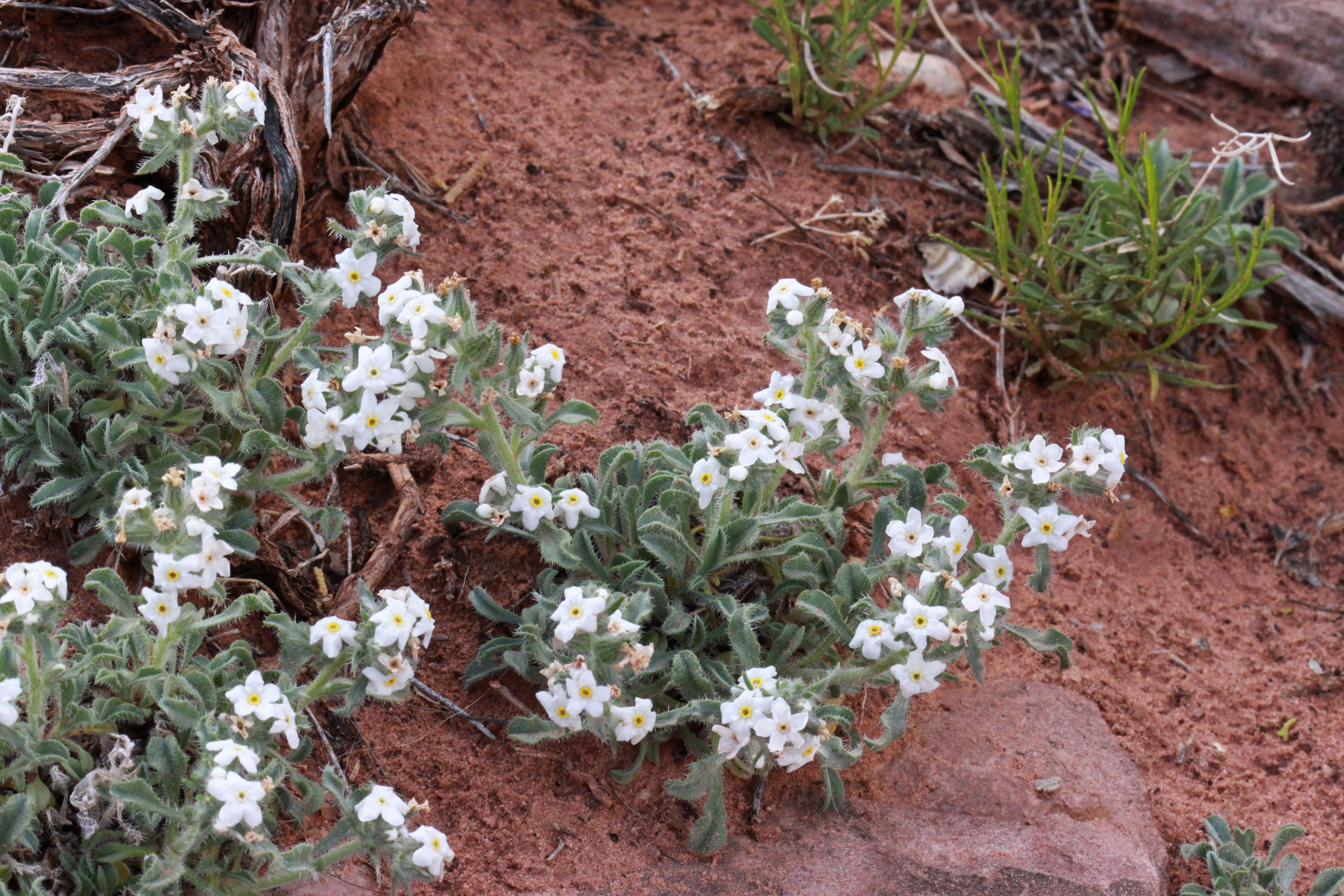
- Cryptantha osterhoutii

Scientific classification
- Kingdom: Plantae
- Clade: Tracheophytes
- Clade: Angiosperms
- Clade: Eudicots
- Clade: Asterids
- Order: Boraginales
- Family: Boraginaceae
- Genus: Cryptantha
- Species: C. osterhoutii

Binomial name
- Cryptantha osterhoutii (Payson) Payson

= Cryptantha osterhoutii =

Species of flowering plant

Cryptantha osterhoutii, or Osterhout's cryptantha, is a rare herbaceous perennial occurring in the U.S. states of Colorado, Utah, and Arizona. It is also known by the synonym Oreocarya osterhoutii Payson, and common name Osterhout cat's-eye. It is named in honor of George Everett Osterhout.
