= Osterhaus =

Osterhaus may refer to:

== People ==
- Ab Osterhaus (born 1948), leading Dutch virologist, veterinarian and influenza expert
- Hugo Osterhaus (1851–1927), American admiral
- Peter Joseph Osterhaus (1823–1917), Prussian general in the Union Army in the American Civil War
- Robert Osterhaus (born 1931), American politician

== Other uses ==
- USS Osterhaus, United States Navy vessel during World War II

== See also ==
- Osterhausen, Saxony-Anhalt, Germany
- Østerhus, a village in Grimstad, Norway
