= Physaria floribunda =

Conservation status
- Apparently Secure (NatureServe)

Scientific classification
- Kingdom: Plantae
- Clade: Tracheophytes
- Clade: Angiosperms
- Clade: Eudicots
- Clade: Rosids
- Order: Brassicales
- Family: Brassicaceae
- Genus: Physaria
- Species: P. floribunda

Binomial name
- Physaria floribunda Rydb.

Species of flowering plant

Physaria floribunda, the pointtip twinpod, is a member of the family Brassicaceae. It is an herbaceous perennial occurring in the United States states of Colorado, Utah, and Arizona.

A variety, Physaria floribunda Rydb. var. osterhoutii (Payson) Rollins (with two synonyms: Physaria floribunda Rydb. ssp. osterhoutii (Payson) O'Kane, and Physaria osterhoutii Payson), is named in honor of George Everett Osterhout. It occurs only in Colorado.
