= The Treehouse (video game) =

1991 video game

- Apple II cover art
- Developer: Broderbund
- Publisher: Broderbund
- Producer: Janese Swanson
- Designers: Leslie Grimm; Lynn Kirkpatrick
- Composer: Tom Rettig
- Series: Early Learning Family Series
- Engine: Mohawk
- Platforms: MS-DOS, Apple II, Mac, FM Towns, Windows
- Release: June 1991 (MS-DOS); 1992 (Apple II); September 23, 1993 (Mac); 1995 (FM Towns); 1996 (Windows)
- Genre: Educational
- Modes: Single-player, multiplayer

The Treehouse is a point-and-click educational video game for MS-DOS and then ported to Mac and the FM Towns, with Windows versions arriving later. Following the success of The Playroom, Broderbund created The Treehouse, which provides more content and furthers the user's ability to explore. First released in 1991, most copies were sold in educational supply stores rather than mainstream stores that sold computer software; it included a sing-along cassette tape. It was re-released in 1996 for Windows 3.1 and Windows 95. Although the Windows version has the same general activities, the characters, interface, and locations are different.

== Gameplay ==
The game's main characters are two opossums who at various times either want to play or take a nap. The activities within the game include music composition and learning, a music maze, a picture scene with interactive objects, a puppet show and a Monopoly-style game that teaches counting and currency concepts.

== Educational goals ==
The game is designed for older learners than The Playroom. The subjects in the game include math, language, music, creative art and science. Children are encouraged to explore new places, learn new facts and put their creative skills to use.

== Reception ==
Reception

Review scores
Publication	Score
Computer Gaming World	5/5
GameSpot	6.6 (Remake)

Award
Publication	Award
Oppenheim Toy Portfolio Award	Platinum Award

Computer Gaming World gave The Treehouse five out of five stars, stating that it had a "rich, full environment" with "excellent sound effects" and placed it as one of the SPA Top Hits for Home Education. The game was given a platinum award at the 1994 Oppenheim Toy Portfolio Awards. The judges claimed that "the graphics and music are first-rate, and the activities are interactive and fun".
