= Roger Lawrence Williams =

American historian

- Born: June 22, 1923; Boulder, Colorado
- Died: July 4, 2017 (aged 94); Laramie, Wyoming
- Title: Distinguished Professor

Academic background
- Education: University of Michigan
- Thesis: The Duc de Morny and Franco-Russian Relations, 1856-63 (1951)
- Doctoral advisor: André Lobanov-Rostovsky

Academic work
- Institutions: Minnesota State University, Mankato; Massachusetts Institute of Technology; Michigan State University; Antioch College; University of California, Santa Barbara; University of Wyoming
- Main interests: French political history, especially the time of Napoleon III; Botany

Roger Lawrence Williams (June 22, 1923 – July 4, 2017), was an American historian with major interests in French political history, particularly the Second Empire associated with Napoleon III. He served on the faculty in History departments at several universities, becoming department head at three. He was a founding member of the Society for French Historical Studies. In later years he developed a keen interest in botany, and wrote extensively on that subject, especially its early history in France. Williams did not marry and left his estate to the Wyoming Community Foundation.

== Education ==
Williams graduated from Greeley High School in Greeley, Colorado, then attended Colorado College. After an interruption to serve in the U.S. Army (1943–1946) he obtained his AB degree in 1947. He earned his MA in 1948 and PhD in European history in 1951 at the University of Michigan.

== Academic positions ==
Beginning his career he served as assistant professor or visiting professor at three institutions: Minnesota State University, Mankato (1950–1952), Massachusetts Institute of Technology (1952–1955), Michigan State University (1955–1956). He then became associate professor and later History department head at Antioch College(1956–1965), and professor and subsequently head of the History Department at University of California, Santa Barbara (1965–1971).

In 1971, when offered the position of Chancellor at UC Santa Barbara, he declined, preferring to return to Wyoming, and accepted the position of Professor and Department Head at the University of Wyoming. He "built the department into the region’s leading history department." In 1978 he was honored with the title Distinguished Professor (UW's first such). He retired in 1988, and became a research associate of the Rocky Mountain Herbarium.

Upon Williams' death, a colleague wrote of him: "Undergraduates were attracted by his high standards, carefully crafted lectures, and subtle humor. His graduate students, who now live and work throughout the United States and Canada, fondly recall his gifts as advisor and mentor."

== Professional activities ==
History

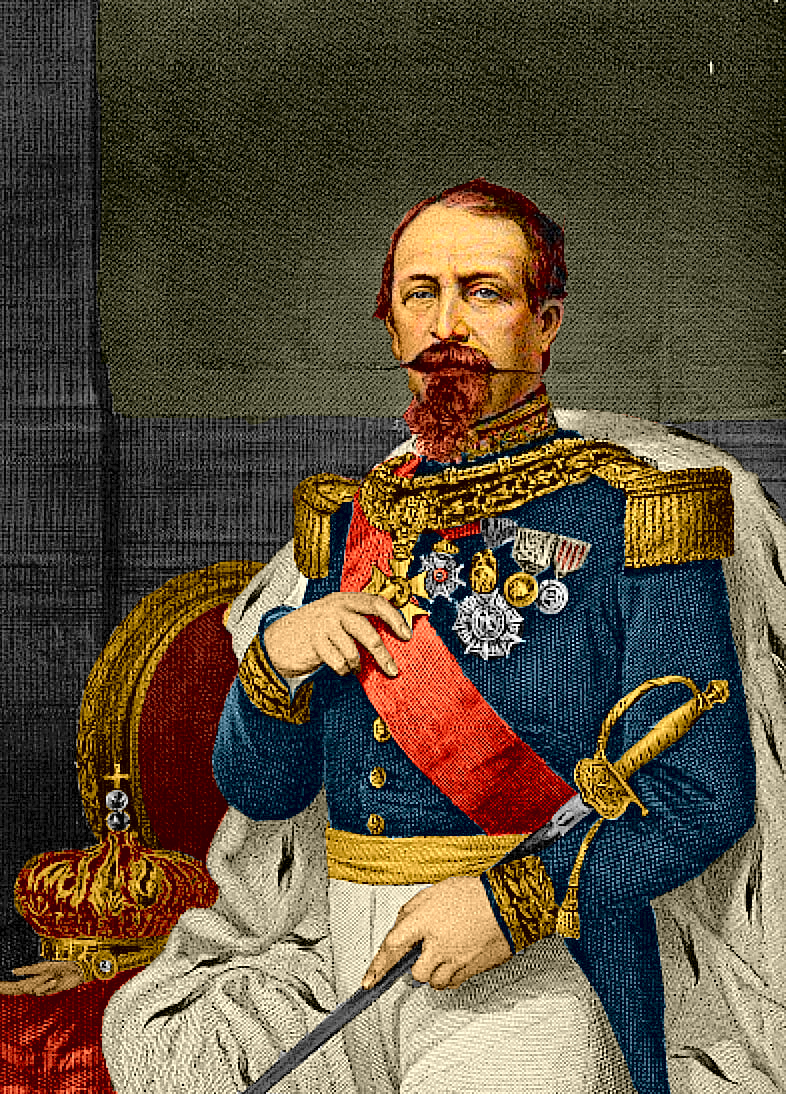
Napoleon III

Williams was encouraged by historian friend Jacques Barzun to explore French cultural history, which led Williams to produce a series of books on Napoleon III and the Second French Empire, and the times leading up to and following that epoch. The first book, Gaslight and Shadow, adopted a style followed by many of his later works: he "abandons the more orthodox chronological approach in favor of a mosaic ... of ten vignettes chosen to portray the many facets of the Second Empire". Each chapter focuses on a person who thrived in or influenced the era - including Jacques Offenbach and Louis Pasteur. In the Preface he notes the human proclivity which often leads to times of turmoil in history: "Great wealth can patronize creativity, or it can stimulate a greed for more wealth and power."

Later books covered this period in great detail. In a vein similar to Gaslight and Shadow, Manners and Murders in the World of Louis-Napoleon consists of a series of chapters, each "concerned with a single crime and its trial".

The Jacques Barzun Prize in Cultural History, one of two prizes awarded by the American Philosophical Society, was established and funded by Williams in 1993.

Botany

A few years before retiring as Distinguished Professor and Department Head of the University of Wyoming, Williams began his first scholarly work in botany. In 1979 he began his biography of the botanical taxonomist Aven Nelson with help from his family; the book was published in 1984.

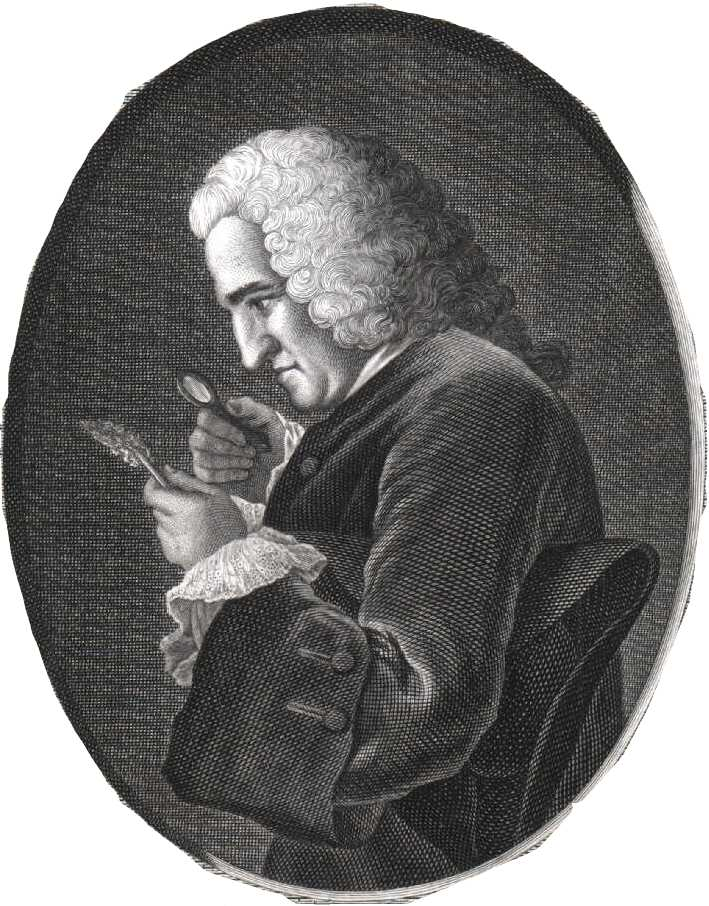
Bernard de Jussieu

A short while later he produced a treatise on botanist George Everett Osterhout in the botanical journal Brittonia. In 1988, using his extensive knowledge of French history, he began to delve into the beginnings of modern botany.

His 2001 book "Botanophilia in Eighteenth Century France", consists of chapters on Carl Linnaeus, members of the De Jussieu family, Augustin Pyramus de Candolle, the contributions of the philosopher Jean-Jacques Rousseau, and other persons and events. The book covers a significant era in the History of botany, specifically in the area of plant taxonomy. It depicts the transformation of botany from an adjunct to medicine, into a mature science on its own merits.

He also contributed to the knowledge of the flora of the Rocky Mountains, publishing revisions of a classic identification aid. His 2003 book, A Region of Astonishing Beauty, deals with many botanical explorers of the Rocky Mountains, including the first to explore the high country Edwin James, whose words were used by Williams for the title. "Williams covers every serious collector who spent even part of their collecting time in the Rocky Mountains."

== Works ==
French political history

- Williams, Roger L. (1957). Gaslight and Shadow The World of Napoleon III, 1851-1870. New York: MacMillan Co. ISBN 9780837198217.
- Williams, Roger L. (1964). Modern Europe, 1660-1945. New York: St. Martin's Press.
- Williams, Roger L. (1966). Henri Rochefort, Prince of the Gutter Press. Scribner. ISBN 1199452807.
- Williams, Roger L. (1969). Commune of Paris, 1871 (Major Issues in History). John Wiley & Sons Ltd. ISBN 0471948519.
- Williams, Roger L. (1969). The French Revolution of 1870-1871. W.W. Norton. ISBN 0393098370.
- Williams, Roger L. (1971). The Mortal Napoleon III. Princeton Univ. Press. ISBN 9780691051925.
- Williams, Roger L. (1972). A Short History of Europe Since Napoleon. New York: John Wiley & Sons, Inc. ISBN 0-471-94750-4.
- Williams, Roger L. (1975). Manners and Murders in the World of Louis-Napoleon. Seattle: University of Washington Press. ISBN 0-295-95431-0.
- Hollister, C. Warren; Williams, Roger L.; et al. (1975). River Through Time: The Course of Western Civilization. John Wiley & Sons. ISBN 9780471406952.
- Williams, Roger L. (1980). The Horror of Life. University of Chicago Press. ISBN 9780226899183.
- Freeman, John F.; Williams, Roger L. (1988). How modernity came to a Provençal town : citizens and clergy of Grasse. Lewiston, N.Y.: E. Mellen Press.
- Williams, Roger L. (1993). Napoleon III and the Stoeffel Affair. Worland, WY: High Plains Publishing Company. ISBN 9781881019039.
- Williams, Roger L. (2005). "Revolution and Madness: Blanqui and Trelat". Journal of the Historical Society. 5 (2): 227–252. doi:10.1111/j.1529-921x.2005.00128.x.
- Williams, Roger L. (2006). "From Malesherbes to Tocqueville: The Legacy of Liberalism". Journal of the Historical Society. 6 (3): 443–463. doi:10.1111/j.1540-5923.2006.00187.x.
- Williams, Roger L. (2008). "Tocqueville on Religion". Journal of the Historical Society. 8 (4): 585–600. doi:10.1111/j.1540-5923.2008.00262.x.
- Halevy, Ludovic (2009). Notes and Remembrances, 1871-1872. Translated by Williams, Roger L. University of Delaware Press. ISBN 978-0874130850.

Botany

- Williams, Roger L. (1984). Aven Nelson of Wyoming. Boulder, CO: Colorado Associated University Press. ISBN 0-87081-147-9.
- Williams, Roger L. (1987). "On the Mountain Top with Mr. Osterhout". Brittonia. 39 (2): 149–158. doi:10.1007/bf02914260. S2CID 84587367.
- Williams, Roger L. (1988). "Gerard and Jaume: Two Neglected Figures in the History of Jussiaean Classification (Parts One and Two)". Taxon. 37 (1): 2–34. doi:10.2307/1220932. JSTOR 1220932.
- Williams, Roger L. (1988). "Gerard and Jaume: Two Neglected Figures in the History of Jussiaean Classification (Part Three)". Taxon. 37 (2): 233–271. doi:10.2307/1222135. JSTOR 1222135.
- Nelson, Ruth Ashton; Williams, Roger L. (1992). Handbook of Rocky Mountain Plants, 4th Edition. Lanham, MD: Roberts Rinehart. ISBN 0911797963.
- Williams, Roger L. (1997). The Letters of Dominique Chaix, Botanist-Curé (International Archives of the History of Ideas Archives internationales d'histoire des idées). Springer. ISBN 978-9401063104.
- Williams, Roger L. (2001). Botanophilia in Eighteenth-Century France: The Spirit of the Enlightenment (International Archives of the History of Ideas Archives internationales d'histoire des idées). Springer. ISBN 9780792368861.
- Williams, Roger L. (2002). A Guide to Rocky Mountain Plants. Lanham, MD: Roberts Rinehart. ISBN 1570984123.
- Williams, Roger L. (2003). French Botany in the Enlightenment: The Ill-fated Voyages of La Pérouse and His Rescuers (International Archives of the History of Ideas Archives internationales d'histoire des idées). Springer. ISBN 1402011091.
- Williams, Roger L. (2003). A Region of Astonishing Beauty. Lanham, MD: Roberts Rinehart. ISBN 1-57098-397-6.
- Williams, Roger L. (2004). "An Intellectual Biography of Elie-Abel Carrière (1818-1896)". Brittonia. 56 (4): 365–374. doi:10.1663/0007-196x(2004)056[0365:aiboec]2.0.co;2. S2CID 9293528.
- Williams, Roger L. (2007). "Malesherbes: Botanist, Arborist, Agronome". Journal of the Historical Society. 7 (2): 265–284. doi:10.1111/j.1540-5923.2007.00217.x.
- Williams, Roger (2008). "French Connections: Cultivating American Trees in Revolutionary France" (PDF). Forest History Today (Spring): 20–27.
- Williams, Roger L. (2009). "Botanists and Medical Herbalism in Montpellier". Brittonia. 61 (1): 85–92. doi:10.1007/s12228-008-9052-x. S2CID 1606490.
- Williams, Roger L. (translator, editor) (2011). "On the establishment of the principal gardens of botany: a bibliographical essay by Jean-Philippe-François Deleuze" (PDF). Huntia. 14 (2): 147–176.
