= Roger D. Williams =

American army officer from Kentucky (1856–1925)

Roger D. Williams (1856–1925) was an American army officer from the state of Kentucky.

== Rough Riders ==
Roger D. Williams, then of Philadelphia, was on April 30, 1898, asked by Theodore Roosevelt to raise a company of "rough-riding and fighting Kentuckians" for the Spanish–American War. He was then vice president of the National Fox Hunters' Association, and had been master of the hounds at the most recent annual meet at Cynthiana.

== Hobbies ==
He was known as a sportsman, having hunted grizzlies with Roosevelt in the Rockies; hunted wolves in Montana, deer in Arkansas, ducks in Southern Tennessee, and fished for tarpon in Florida waters. He bred bloodhounds and in 1898 imported two Irish wolf hounds and owned a pair of wolves, which he fought against dogs.

Williams was also a musician and an amateur actor. He wrote numerous magazine articles regarding wolf hunts and dogs, and according to The Times of Philadelphia, was in 1898 considered "one of the best posted kennel men in the United States."

== Sources ==
- "As Versatile as Roosevelt". The Philadelphia Times. May 1, 1898. p. 3.
- "Last Rites for Soldier Today". The Lexington Herald. December 15, 1925. pp. 1, 3.
