= Ralph Osterhout =

American inventor

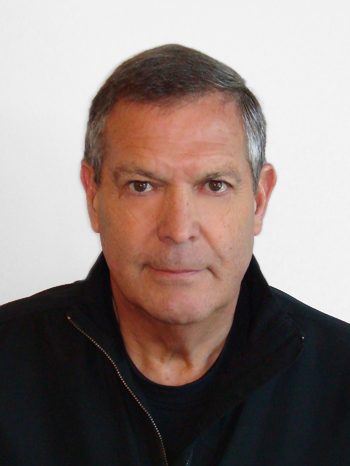
Ralph Osterhout

Ralph Osterhout is an American inventor, designer, entrepreneur, and CEO of Osterhout Design Group (ODG). During his career he has developed a range of products spanning toys, consumer electronics, dive equipment, furniture to devices for the Department of Defense. Osterhout is named as inventor on 260 patents and patent applications. Over the course of his career, Osterhout has developed over 2,000 different products and hundreds of separate product lines for companies ranging from start-ups to Fortune 500s, as well as the government.

Since 2009, Osterhout has been highly focused on developing products and technologies in the head-worn computing field. Osterhout has over three decades of developing head-worn technology (starting with the PVS-7 Night Vision Goggles in 1984) and has created nine different generations of smartglasses.

Osterhout has been referred to as the "real-life Q", in reference to the fictional character Q that equips James Bond with secret spy gadgets, after Osterhout designed and developed several gadgets for James Bond films.

== Early life ==
Ralph Osterhout was born in Seattle, Washington, in 1946 and moved to Santa Cruz, California, at the age of one. He attended Soquel High School graduating in 1964 and later went on to San Jose State University graduating in 1969.

A pivotal point in Osterhout's life was at the 1969 boat show, where he showcased the first of a kind diver propulsion vehicle (DPV) named the MK I. The Navy subsequently purchased the MK II in 1970. With the purchase of the DPV, Osterhout founded the scuba equipment company Farallon Industries and began a career in product development and design.

== Companies ==
=== Tekna ===
Sport Scuba Diving Equipment and Consumer Products – CEO/Founder (1976–1990)

Tekna knives and flashlights are valued by outdoor enthusiasts and scuba divers for their innovative designs and ruggedness. In 1990 Ray-o-Vac purchased Tekna and continued to produce these items. Tekna flashlights and knives are now owned and produced by Tektite Industries.

Products Osterhout developed as founder of Tekna include:

- Tekna- Knife: A favorite among divers because of its versatile design and solid, one-piece skeleton construction.
- Tekna-Lite: The original tactical flashlight and the first light to have a battery indicator. These lights have been dropped from a 7-story building, run over by an 8-ton dump truck and operated from the top of Mt. Everest to 2,000 feet (600 m) below water, whilst surviving the abuse. The flashlight assembly was featured on the TV program How Its Made.
- Tekna Wilderness Edge Survival Knife: A utility knife that has many components in it, from saw blades to a fishing reel. These are standard issue under the seats of Japanese Defense Forces Planes.
- Tekna Computek: A first of its kind dive computer that precisely calculates the divers depth, maximum depth, bottom time, surface intervals, tank pressure, remaining air time, and decompression status that are displayed pictographically.
- Tekna Dive Vehicle: A diver propulsion vehicle that was injection-molded.
- Tekna Mini-Piloted Scuba Regulator: This ultra miniature diver's regulator caused a revolution in regulator design by performing No. 1 in Navy tests. It's the only regulator that actually got easier to breathe at increased depth.

=== S-Tron ===
Defense Contractor – CEO/Founder (1985 to 1990)

Under S-Tron, some of the products Ralph Osterhout designed include the following:

- PVS-7 Night Vision Goggle: Its revolutionary design used new composite materials and weighed less than half as much as the PVS-5A goggles at only 1.5 pounds. It was designed, engineered and tooled in just 3 months and has been used in 3 wars since its inception by the US Army, Navy, Air Force and Marines.
- TD 110 Dual wavelength Laser Aiming System: Allows for successful targeting at 650 meters. US Special Operations Command.
- Closed-Circuit Mixed Gas Rebreather: MK-19 was designed to allow a combat swimmer to lock out of a submarine at depths greater than 300 feet and disable mines.^{[5]} It features a non-magnetic, non-acoustic construction that does not emit bubbles, allowing the swimmer to operate in a stealth manner for >8 hours at a time. US Navy.
- Pilots automatic life-preserver system(LPU-9) is a first of a kind, compact life preserver system that is designed to be worn by Navy pilots and to automatically inflate in the event of a splash down. US Navy.^{[17]}
- Diver Propulsion Vehicles or DPV: US Navy.
- Diver Active Thermal Protection System or DATPS: This unit circulates warm water through a closed-circuit, combat diver's suit in order to maintain a constant body temperature by burning magnesium at 5,000 degrees, controlled by a micro-controller and thermistor array. The unit is used for surveillance, sub and mine counter-measures operations in freezing temperatures. Special Operations Command.

=== Machina/Team Machina ===
==== Consumer Electronics – CEO/Founder (1990–1999) ====
Created products under the Machina brand and developed products for other brands under the company Team Machina.

Osterhout's first design for Tiger Electronics was the $20 Talkboy FX that had a tiny solid-state memory and voice-recording chip built into a pen. Tiger president Roger Shiffman said, "It was a breakthrough product in the industry, because it was the first to bring digital recording technology to low-cost toys." In 1995, the Talkboy FX sold a million units within 45-day of launch.

In 1996, Machina generated $12 million in yearly revenues. Some of the clients of Team Machina included: Tiger Electronics, Brookstone, Specialized, Sega, Nike, Playmates Toys, Tonka, Yes!, Milton Bradley, Ray-o-vac, Lockheed Martin, Fisher-Price, Hasbro, Bandai, and Eddie Bauer. Osterhout's toy product line includes:

- Power Penz: Ballpoint pens that fly, shoot, spy, speak and write in invisible ink.
- Talk-Boy pens: A line of pens that have keyboards and voice modulation.
- CARDCORDER 90: Credit card sized voice recorder.
- Handheld games: Virtual Cop, Dragon Heart and WARHAWK made for Tiger Electronics.
- Yapper: Telephone mounted voice changer. Made for Sega.
- Yak Bak, Mega Mouth, Radical Air Weapons (RAW): Made for Yes! and did $38 million in sales its first year.

=== Osterhout Design Group (ODG) ===
CEO/Founder (1999–present)

San Francisco-based ODG was founded in 1999 as a technology incubator. ODG was one of the leading developers and manufacturers of mobile headworn computing devices that offer capabilities such as augmented reality, virtual reality, and mixed reality.

It is reported that in January 2014, Microsoft paid up to $150M to purchase wearable computing IP assets from ODG that are related to augmented reality and headworn computers. The acquisition included over 81 patents with 20 issued patents, and “at least” 75 patents in progress both in the U.S. and internationally. The patents sold to Microsoft covered features such as “See-through near-eye display glasses including a partially reflective, partially transmitting optical element” and “Video display modification based on sensor input for a see-through near-to-eye display.”

Following the IP asset acquisition with Microsoft, Osterhout and the ODG team have published 198 patent applications and have been issued 41 patents on optics, augmented reality, and headworn technology as well as developed three new models of headworn devices including the R-7, R-7HL, R-8, and R-9 Smartglasses.

In December 2016, ODG closed a $58 million Series A funding round with strategic investors including 21st Century Fox. The Series A is the largest ever in the history of wearables, augmented reality, and virtual reality.

As of March 24, 2019, it was reported that ODG has closed its doors, suspended business, and continues to seek a sale of its remaining IP.

== Films and television ==
Osterhout designed and built equipment that appeared in or on:

- James Bond: The Spy Who Loved Me, propulsion system on submarine car and chase mini-subs.
- James Bond: Never Say Never Again, underwater vehicles that transported bad guy's atomic warheads.
- How It's Made: Season 8 Episode 3 - Flashlights
- ABC World News Tonight

== Lectures ==
- "What's on the Horizon" - AWE 2016 Keynote
- Nasa Is Developing Wearable Tech Glasses for Astronauts
- D.I.C.E. Summit
- The Electric Playground Interview
- Entertainment Gathering Conference
- National Conference, Industrial Designer's Society of America
- Stanford Design Forum
