= William Craig (frontiersman) =

William Craig (1807, Greenbrier County, Virginia – 1869, Idaho) was an American frontiersman and trapper. He left his Virginia home as a young man and headed west, after allegedly killing a man in self-defense. He trapped with the Sublettes (William and Milton) and Jedediah Smith in the Blackfoot country until he joined Joseph R. Walker's California Expedition of 1833–34.

In 1836, William Craig, Pruett Sinclair and Philip Thompson established a trading post known as Fort Davy Crockett in Brown's Hole, now in the state of Colorado. Leaving the declining fur trade, in 1840 Craig and former trapper friends Joseph Meek and Robert Newell acted as guides to a missionary party to Fort Hall, Idaho and on to the Whitman Mission near Walla Walla, Washington. While Newell and Meek and their native wives and children sought a new life in the Willamette Valley of what is now Oregon, Craig joined his Nimiipuu family along the Clearwater River and Lapwai Creek of what is now Idaho. According to a later affidavit, Craig had, in 1838, married Pahtissah (he renamed her Isabel), a Nez Perce woman who was the daughter of Hin-mah-tute-ke-kaikt also known as Thunder Eyes. Craig was friendly with the Nez Perce tribe: in 1848—in the aftermath of the killings at the Whitman Mission—Oregon Country's provisional government Superintendent of Indian Affairs, Joel Palmer, appointed William Craig his agent to the Nez Perces. Craig served as interpreter between the Nez Perce leaders and Isaac Stevens at the Treaty of 1855 held in the Walla Walla Valley, and again at the Treaty of 1856. The Treaty of 1855 granted to William Craig and his wife, Isabel, 640 acres of land in the Lapwai Valley, then part of the newly formed Nez Perce reservation. In 1855 Governor Isaac Stevens appointed William Craig Agent to the Nez Perce people, a position held by Craig until political machinations cost him the job in 1859. William Craig was the first postmaster of "Wailepta" (Walla Walla). He died of a stroke in 1869. William Craig, his wife Isabel, and others of his family are buried in the cemetery at Jaques' Spur in the Lapwai Valley, Idaho, just north of Craig Mountain, at the place he had selected on his land.
