= Andrew Sublette =

American fur trader

- Born: Andrew Whitley Sublette; 1808; Somerset, Pulaski County, Kentucky
- Died: December 19, 1853 or 1854 (age 45-46); Santa Monica Canyon, Santa Monica, Los Angeles County, California, or Malibu Canyon, Malibu, Los Angeles County, California
- Other names: Andrew Sublett, Andrew Whitley Sublett
- Occupations: frontiersman, trapper, fur trader, explorer
- Known for: Being a co-owner of the Rocky Mountain Fur Company, with Andrew Henry
- Relatives: William Sublette (brother), Milton Sublette (brother), Pinkney Sublette (brother), Solomon Sublette (brother)

Andrew Whitley Sublette or also, spelled Sublett (1808 – December 19, 1853, or 1854), was a frontiersman, trapper, fur trader, explorer, mountain man and brother to William, Milton, and Solomon, helped establish a trading post with Louis Vasquez in 1835. The present day, Fort Vasquez, located on Highway 85, next to Platteville, Colorado, is a reconstruction. After selling the trading post in 1840, Andrew left the mountains and was seen in El Pueblo around 1844 and 1845 (present day Pueblo, Colorado), traveling along the Arkansas River, following herds of American bison.

He died in an encounter with a grizzly bear in Southern California on December 19, 1853, or 1854. Sources variously place the site of his death as Santa Monica Canyon or nearby Malibu Canyon.
