= Jedediah Smith =

American explorer (1799–1831)

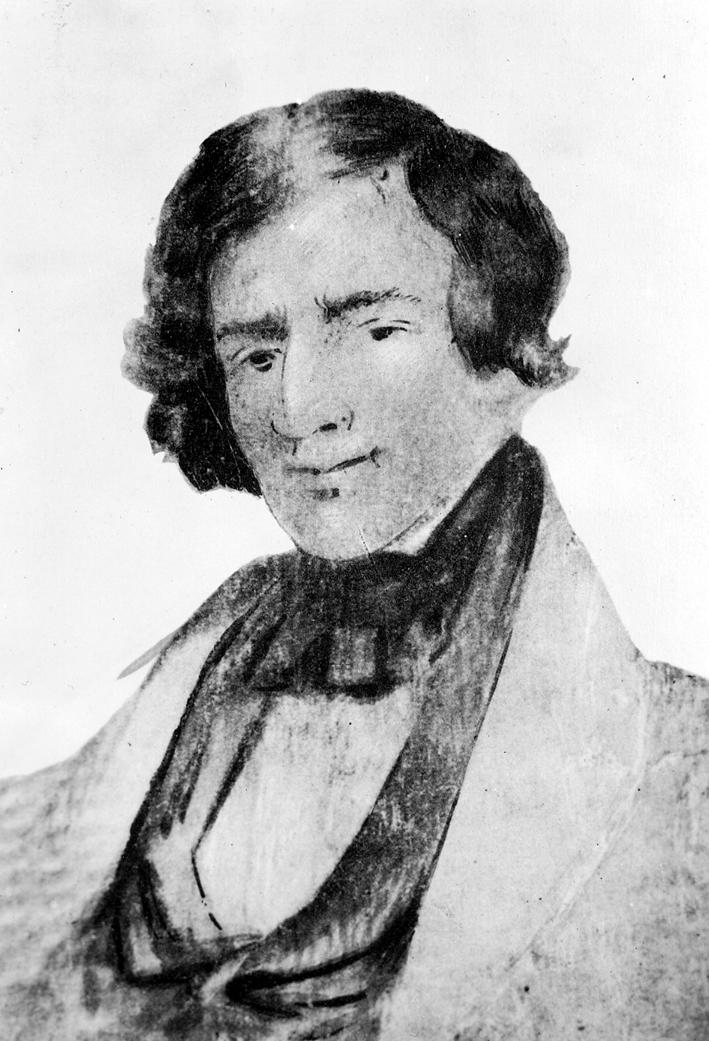
- Life portrait, said to have been drawn by a friend, from memory, after Smith's death
- Born: Jedediah Strong Smith; January 6, 1799; Jericho, Tioga County, New York (present-day Bainbridge, Chenango County, New York)
- Died: May 27, 1831 (aged 32) near Lower Spring, Territory of Santa Fe de Nuevo México, Mexico (south of present-day Ulysses, Grant County)
- Cause of death: Attacked by Native Americans
- Other names: Old Jed; Jed.
- Occupations: Clerk; frontiersman; hunter; trapper; author; cartographer; explorer
- Employer(s): Ashley-Henry Fur Company, partner in the Ashley Smith Fur Company and Smith, Jackson and Sublette
- Known for: Being a mountain man and explorer of the Rocky Mountains, American West Coast, American Southwest; first west-east crossing of the Great Basin Desert and naming of Cache Valley, Utah

Jedediah Strong Smith (January 6, 1799 – May 27, 1831) was an American clerk, transcontinental pioneer, frontiersman, hunter, trapper, author, cartographer, mountain man and explorer of the Rocky Mountains, the Western United States, and the Southwest during the early 19th century. After 75 years of obscurity following his death, Smith was rediscovered as the American whose explorations led to the use of the 20-mile (32 km)-wide South Pass as the dominant route across the Continental Divide for pioneers on the Oregon Trail.

Coming from a modest family background, Smith traveled to St. Louis and joined William H. Ashley and Andrew Henry's fur trading company in 1822. Smith led the first documented exploration from the Salt Lake frontier to the Colorado River. From there, Smith's party became the first United States citizens to cross the Mojave Desert into what is now the state of California but which at that time was part of Mexico. On the return journey, Smith and his companions were likewise the first U.S. citizens to explore and cross the Sierra Nevada and the treacherous Great Basin Desert. The following year, Smith and companions were the first U.S. explorers to travel north from California overland to the Oregon Country. Surviving three Native American massacres and one bear mauling, Smith's explorations and documented travels were important resources to later American westward expansion.

In March 1831, while in St. Louis, Smith requested of Secretary of War John H. Eaton a federally-funded exploration of the West, but to no avail. Smith informed Eaton that he was completing a map of the West derived from his own journeys. In May, Smith and his partners launched a planned paramilitary trading party to Santa Fe. On May 27, while searching for water in present-day southwest Kansas, Smith disappeared. It was learned weeks later that he had been killed during an encounter with a Comanche defense party– his body was never recovered.

After his death, Smith and his accomplishments were mostly forgotten by Americans. At the beginning of the 20th century, scholars and historians made efforts to recognize and study his achievements. In 1918, a book by Harrison Clifford Dale was published covering Ashley-Smith's western explorations. In 1935, Smith's summary autobiography was finally listed in a biographical dictionary. Smith's first comprehensive biography by Maurice S. Sullivan was published in 1936. A popular Smith biography by Dale Morgan, published in 1953, established Smith as an authentic national hero. Smith's map of the West in 1831 was used by the U.S. Army, including western explorer John C. Frémont, during the early 1840s.

== Early life ==
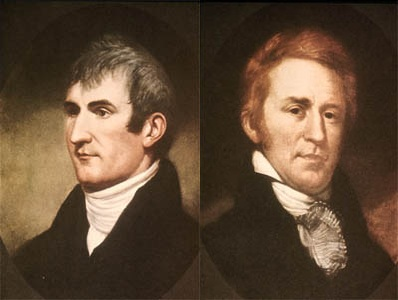
Lewis and Clark

Smith was born in Jericho, now Bainbridge, Chenango County, New York, on January 6, 1799, (Note: According to Dale, p. 175, Smith was born on June 24, 1798, the son of a general store owner from New Hampshire. More recent sources agree on the later date.) to Jedediah Smith I, a general store owner from New Hampshire, and Sally Strong, both of whom were descended entirely from families that came to New England from England during the Puritan emigration between 1620 and 1640. Smith received adequate English instruction, learned some Latin, and was taught how to write decently. Around 1810, Smith's father was caught up in a legal issue involving counterfeit currency after which the elder Smith moved his family west to Erie County, Pennsylvania.

At age 13, Smith worked as a clerk on a Lake Erie freighter, where he learned business practices and probably met traders returning from the far west to Montreal. This work gave Smith an ambition for adventurous wilderness trade. According to Dale L. Morgan, Smith's love of nature and adventure came from his mentor, Dr. Titus G. V. Simons, a pioneer medical doctor who was on close terms with the Smith family. Morgan speculated that Simons gave the young Smith a copy of Meriwether Lewis' and William Clark's 1814 book of their 1804–1806 expedition to the Pacific, (Note: Barbour later wrote that one of Smith's neighbors, Patrick Gass, a member of the Corps of Discovery, may have been the one who introduced young Smith to the story of Lewis and Clark, whom Smith later referenced in his memoir.) and according to legend Smith carried this journal on all of his travels throughout the American West. Smith provided Clark, who had become superintendent of Indian affairs, much information from his own expeditions to the West. In 1817, the Smith family moved westward to Ohio and settled in Green Township in what is present-day Ashland County.

== Smith joins "Ashley's Hundred" ==
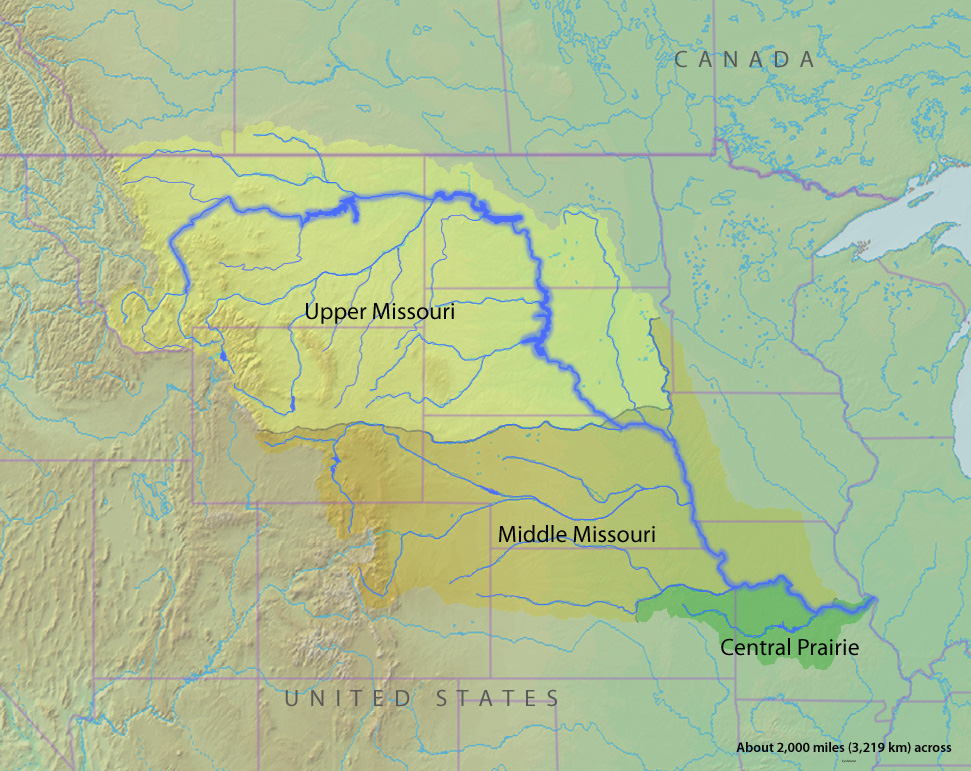
Regions of the Missouri River Watershed

Coming from a family of modest means, Smith sought to make his own way. He may have left his family in search of a trade or employment a year prior to their settlement in Green Township. In 1822, Smith was living in St. Louis. (Note: There is a dispute when Smith actually arrived in St. Louis; the earliest account is dated 1816.) The same year Smith responded to an advertisement in the Missouri Gazette placed by General William H. Ashley. General Ashley and Major Andrew Henry, (Note: Henry had formerly been associated with the Missouri Fur Company.) veterans of the War of 1812, had established a partnership to engage in the fur trade and were looking for "One Hundred" "Enterprising Young Men" to explore and trap in the Rocky Mountains. Superintendent of Indian Affairs William Clark had granted Ashley and Henry license to trade with Native Americans in the upper Missouri River, and he actively encouraged them to compete with the powerful British fur trade in the Pacific Northwest. Smith, a 6-foot-tall, 23-year-old with a commanding presence, impressed General Ashley to hire him. In late spring, Smith started up the Missouri on the keelboat Enterprize, which sank three weeks into the journey. Smith and the other men waited at the site of the wreck for a replacement boat, hunting and foraging for food. Ashley brought up another boat with an additional 46 men and upon proceeding upriver, Smith got his first glimpse of the western frontier, coming into contact with the Sioux and Arikara. On October 1, Smith reached Fort Henry at the mouth of the Yellowstone River, which had just been built by Major Henry and the men that he had led up earlier. (Note: A letter addressed to Joshua Pilcher stated that Henry left St. Louis with "one boat and one hundred & fifty men by land and water". There is no indication of how many men were with Smith on the Enterprize, but the fact that Ashley brought up an additional 46 men on the replacement boat indicates it may have been 40–50. Although the advertisement placed by Ashley was asking for 100 men, around 250 were actually engaged. The "100 men" were to be trappers and were called "Ashley's Hundred".) Smith and some other men continued up Missouri River to the mouth of the Musselshell River, where they built a camp from which to trap through the winter.

== Arikaras attack ==
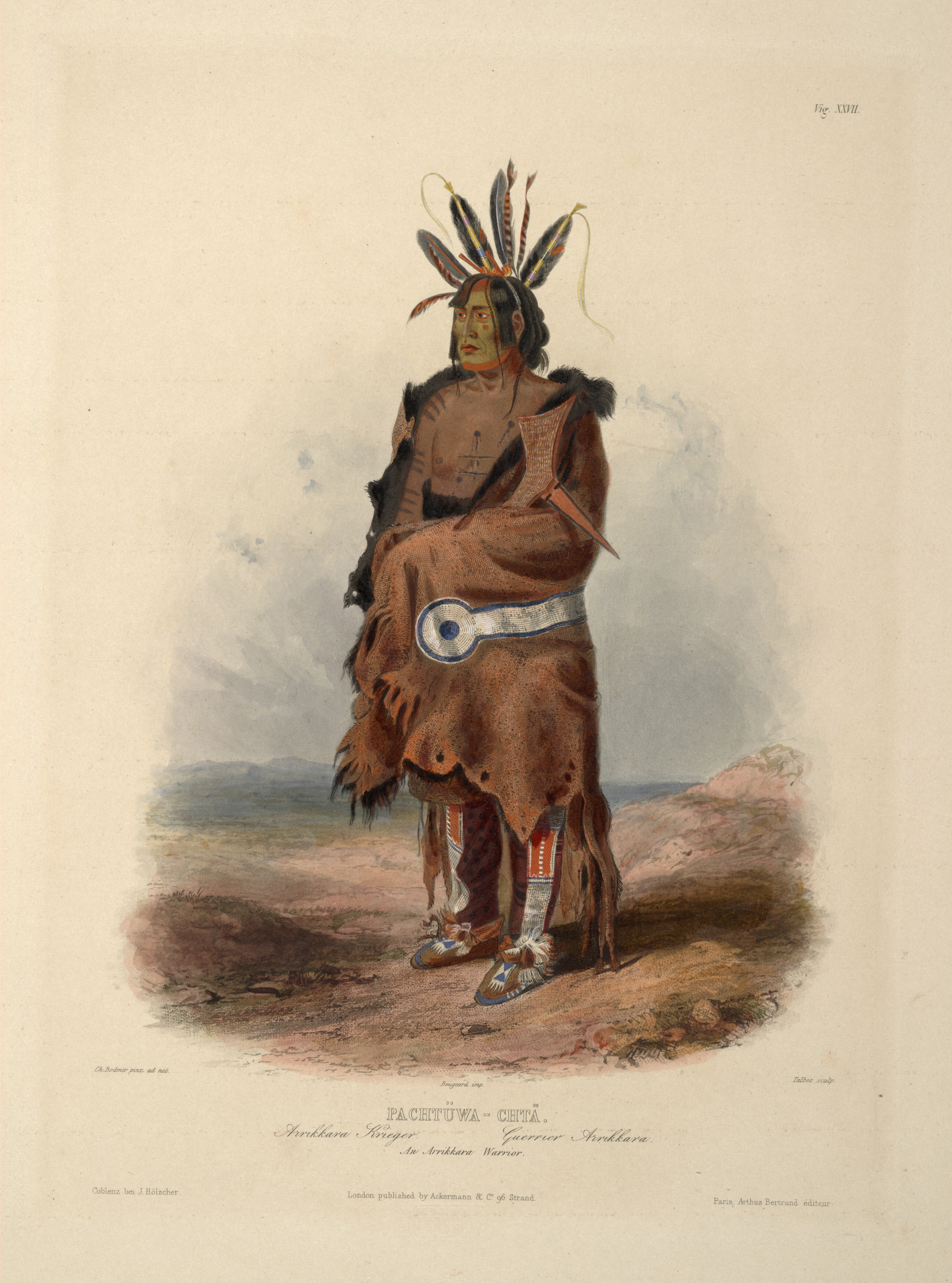
Arikara warrior Bodmer (1840–1843)

In the spring of 1823, Major Henry ordered Smith back down the Missouri River to the Grand River with a message for Ashley to buy horses from the Arikaras, who, because of a recent skirmish with Missouri Fur Company men, were antagonistic to the white traders. Ashley, who was bringing supplies as well as 70 new men upriver by boat, met Smith at the Arikara village on May 30. They negotiated a trade for several horses and 200 buffalo robes and planned to leave as soon as possible to avert trouble, but weather delayed them. Before they could depart, an incident provoked an Arikara attack. Forty Ashley men, including Smith, were caught in a vulnerable position, and 12 were killed in the ensuing battle. (Note: Another man had died in the initial incident, and one more died later of his injuries, making 14 the total death toll of the Euro-Americans.) Smith's conduct during the defense was the foundation of his reputation: "When his party was in danger, Mr. Smith was always among the foremost to meet it, and the last to fly; those who saw him on shore, at the Riccaree fight, in 1823, can attest to the truth of this assertion."

Smith and another man were selected by Ashley to return to Fort Henry on foot to inform Henry of the defeat. Ashley and the rest of the surviving party rode back down the river, ultimately enlisting aid from Colonel Henry Leavenworth who was the commander of Fort Atkinson. In August, Leavenworth sent 250 military men along with 80 Ashley-Henry men, 60 men of the Missouri Fur Company and a number of Lakota Sioux warriors to subdue the Arikaras. After a botched campaign, a peace treaty was negotiated. Smith had been appointed commander of one of the two squads of the Ashley-Henry men and was thereafter known as "Captain Smith".

== First expedition, grizzly bear attack, and South Pass ==
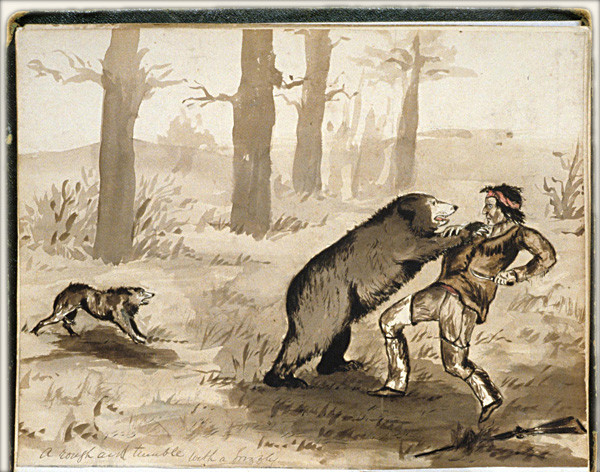
19th-century depiction of a grizzly bear attack

After the campaign, in the fall of 1823, Smith and several other of Ashley's men traveled downriver to Fort Kiowa. Leaving Fort Kiowa in September, Smith and 10 to 16 men headed west, beginning his first far-western expedition, to make their way overland to the Rocky Mountains. Smith and his party were the first Euro-Americans to explore the southern Black Hills, in present-day South Dakota and eastern Wyoming. While looking for the Crow tribe to obtain fresh horses and get westward directions, Smith was attacked by a large grizzly bear. Smith was tackled to the ground by the grizzly, breaking his ribs. Members of his party witnessed him fight the bear, which ripped open his side with its claws and took his head in its mouth. When the bear retreated, Smith's men ran to help him. They found his scalp and ear ripped off, but he convinced a friend, Jim Clyman, to sew it loosely back on, giving him directions. The trappers fetched water, bound up his broken ribs, and cleaned his wounds. After recuperating from his injuries, Smith wore his hair long to cover the large scar from his eyebrow to his ear. The only known portrait of Jedediah Smith, painted after his death in 1831, showed the long hair he wore over the side of his head to hide his scars.

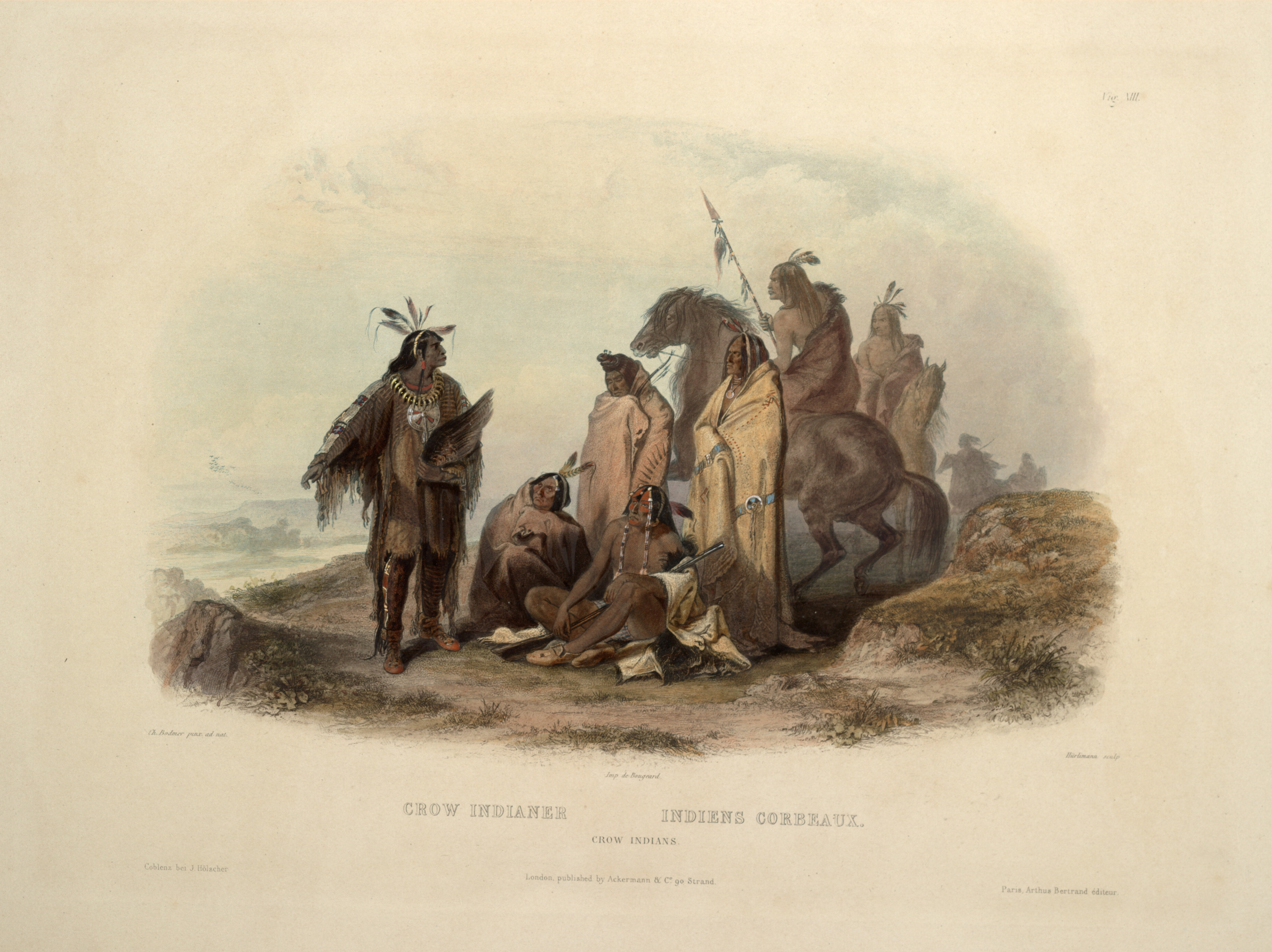
Crow Indians Bodmer (1840–1843)

The party spent the rest of 1823 wintering in the Wind River Valley. In 1824, Smith sent an expedition to find an expedient route through the Rocky Mountains. Smith was able to retrieve information from Crow natives. When communicating with the Crows, one of Smith's men made a unique map (consisting of buffalo hide and sand), and the Crows were able to show Smith and his men the direction to the South Pass. Smith and his men crossed through this pass from east to west and encountered the Green River near the mouth of the Big Sandy River in what is now Wyoming. The group broke into two parties—one led by Smith and the other by Thomas Fitzpatrick—to trap upstream and downstream on the Green. The two groups met in July on the Sweetwater River, and it was decided that Fitzpatrick and two others would take the furs and the news of the identification of a feasible highway route through the Rockies (Note: Whereas South Pass was originally used by emigrants on the Oregon Trail, Jim Bridger later found what was to become a shorter route for the emigrants over the Rockies, just south of the Great Divide Basin. Later, the Transcontinental Railroad and Interstate 80 were routed over the Continental Divide through the Great Divide Basin.) to Ashley in St. Louis. Scottish-Canadian trapper Robert Stuart, employed by John Jacob Astor's Pacific Fur Company, had previously discovered the South Pass, in mid-October 1812, while traveling overland to St. Louis from Fort Astoria, but this information was kept secret. Smith later wrote a letter to Secretary of War John Eaton in 1830 making the location of the South Pass public information. Major Henry returned to St. Louis on August 30, and Ashley began making plans to lead a caravan back to the Rockies to regroup with his men. Henry declined to return with Ashley, instead choosing to retire from the fur trade.

After Fitzpatrick left, Smith and six others, including William Sublette, again crossed South Pass, and in September 1824 encountered a group of Iroquois freemen trappers who had split off from the Hudson's Bay Company Snake Country brigade led by Alexander Ross. Smith told the Iroquois they could get better prices for their furs by selling to American traders and accompanied the brigade back to its base at Flathead Post in Montana. Smith then accompanied the brigade led by Peter Skene Ogden back southeast, leaving Flathead Post in December 1824. In April 1825, on the Bear River in what is now Utah, Smith and his companions split from the brigade and joined a group of Americans that had wintered in the area. In late May 1825, on the Weber River near present Mountain Green, Utah, 23 freemen trappers deserted from Ogden's brigade, backed up by a group of American trappers led by Johnson Gardner. Several of the deserters were among the Iroquois trappers Smith had assisted in September 1824. Smith may have been present at the confrontation, but the extent of his involvement in the desertion of the freemen, if any, is unclear.

== First Rendezvous of 1825 ==
Ashley left St. Louis late in 1824 and after an exploring expedition in Wyoming and Utah, he and Smith were reunited on July 1, 1825, at what would become the first rendezvous. During the rendezvous, Ashley offered Smith a partnership to replace Henry. (Note: The Ashley-Smith partnership was not well publicized, documented only in a letter written by Smith a year later.) Smith returned to St. Louis for a time, where he asked Robert Campbell to join the company as a clerk.

== Second Rendezvous of 1826 ==
During the second rendezvous in the summer of 1826, Ashley decided to no longer be directly involved in the business of harvesting furs. Smith left a cache near the rendezvous site at what would become known as Cache Valley in northern Utah, and he and Ashley traveled north to meet David E. Jackson and Sublette at Bear River area near present-day Soda Springs, Idaho. Ashley sold his interest in his and Smith's partnership to the newly created partnership of Smith, Jackson & Sublette (Note: Upon being sold again in 1830, the Company was called the Rocky Mountain Fur Company (RMFC), and many sources imply that is what Ashley and Henry originally called it.) but agreed to continue to send supplies to the rendezvous and broker the sale of furs brought to him in St. Louis.

The new partners were immediately faced with the reality that beaver were rapidly disappearing from the region where the two previous partnerships had traditionally trapped. Contemporaneous maps promised untrapped rivers to the west, such as the non-existent Buenaventura. The legendary Buenaventura was thought to be a navigable waterway to the Pacific Ocean possibly providing an alternative to packing loads of furs back to St. Louis. The previous spring, Smith had searched for rivers flowing to the Pacific west and northwest of the Great Salt Lake. Although he pushed into eastern Nevada, he failed to find the Humboldt River, the probable source of the legend of the Buenaventura. (Note: The actual source of the legend was the combination of a cartogropher's error and wishful thinking. "Buenaventura" was actually the first name given to the Green River, as the Wikipedia cross reference shows. The cartographer incorrectly showed it flowing into what is now Sevier Lake. The wish to find a river to the Pacific accepted the error.) Having determined the Buenaventura must lie farther south, Smith made plans for an exploratory expedition deep into the Mexican territory of Alta California. (Note: The Ashley-Smith men and other American and Canadian trappers had already ventured into Mexican territory in present-day southwest Wyoming, northwest Colorado and northeast Utah without permission of the Mexican government. For all practical purposes, Mexican authority did not extend much past the Pacific Coastal region.)

=== First trip to California, 1826–27 ===
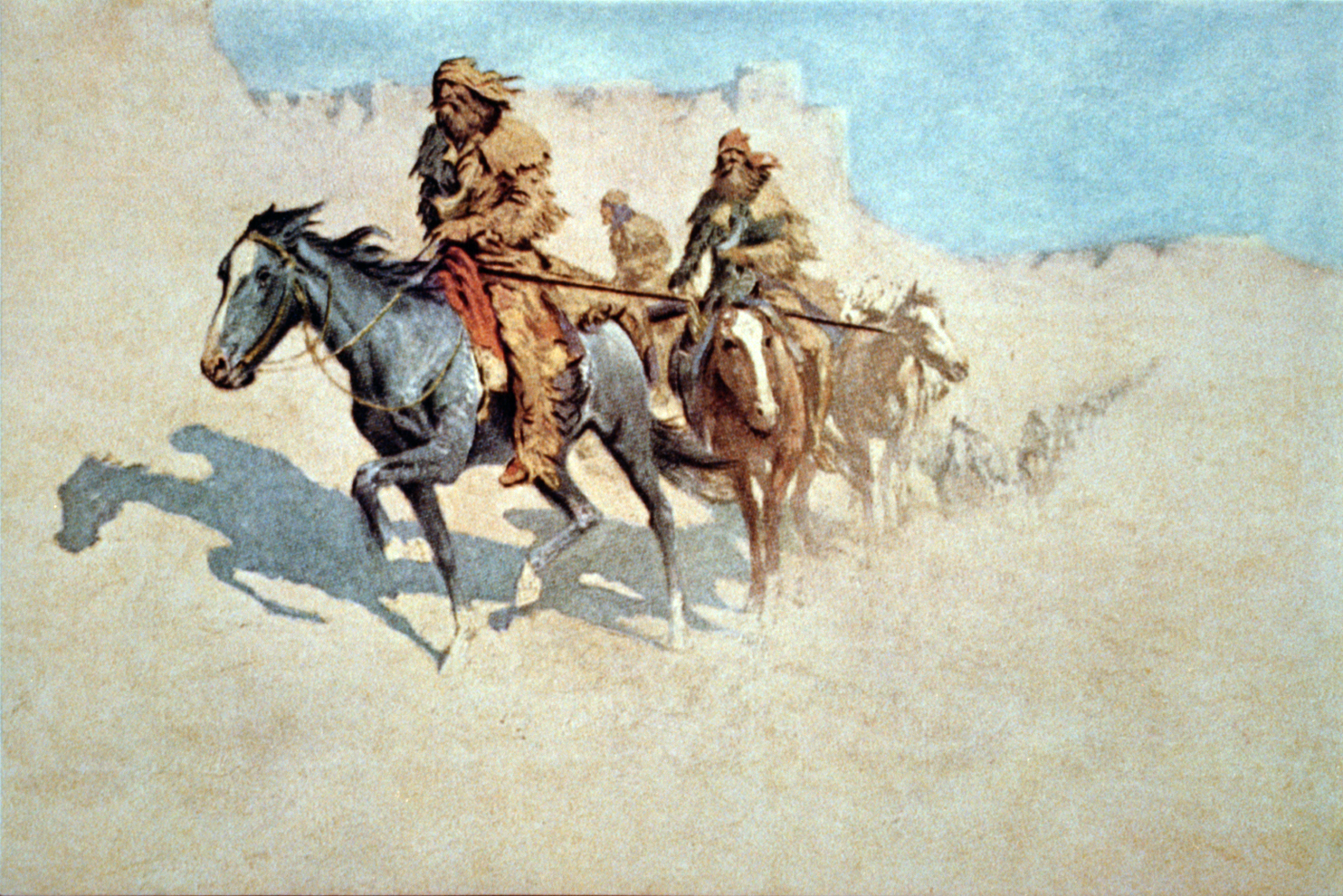
Jedediah Smith's party crossing the burning Mojave Desert during the 1826 trek to California by Frederic Remington

Smith and his party of 15 left the Bear River on August 7, 1826, and after retrieving the cache he had left earlier, they headed south through present-day Utah and Nevada to the Colorado River, finding increasingly harsh conditions and difficult travel. Finding shelter in a friendly Mojave village near present-day Needles, California, the men and horses recuperated. Smith hired two refugees from the Spanish missions in California to guide them west. After leaving the river and heading into the Mojave Desert, the guides led them through the desert via the Mohave Trail that would become the western portion of the Old Spanish Trail. Upon reaching the San Bernardino Valley of California, Smith and Abraham LaPlant borrowed horses from a rancher and rode to the San Gabriel Mission on November 27, 1826, to present themselves to its director, Father José Bernardo Sánchez, who received them warmly. (Note: Harrison Rogers remembered Sánchez fondly in his journal.)

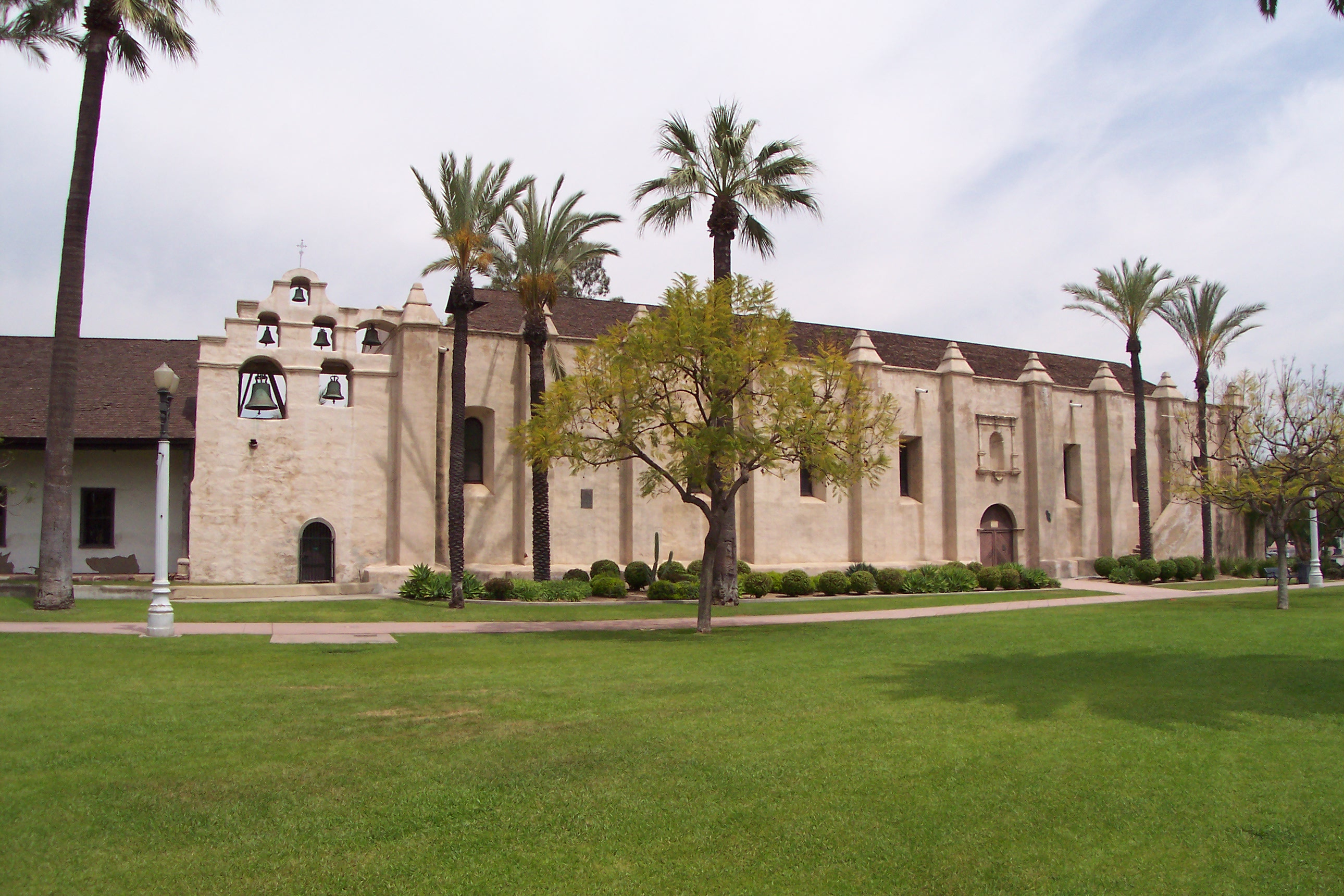
Father Sánchez gave Jedediah and LaPlant a lavish dinner at Mission San Gabriel.

The next day, the rest of Smith's men arrived at the mission, and that night the head of the garrison at the mission confiscated all their guns. On December 8, Smith was summoned to San Diego for an interview with Governor José María Echeandía about his party's status in the country. (Note: As with the Zebulon Pike expedition two decades earlier, the authorities saw Smith's party as a harbinger of future trouble with the United States. Unlike Pike's expedition, which was commissioned by the United States Army, the Smith party was a private commercial venture. Although five members of the 1826 party carried United States passports, the excursion into Mexican territory was unauthorized by the United States government and without permission from the Mexican government.) Echeandía, surprised and suspicious of the Americans' unauthorized entrance into California, had Smith arrested, believing him to be a spy. Accompanied by LaPlant, Smith's Spanish interpreter, Smith was taken to San Diego while the remainder of the party remained at the mission. Echeandía detained Smith for about two weeks, demanding that he turn over his journal and maps. Smith requested permission to travel north to the Columbia River on a coastal route, where known paths could take his party back to United States territory. Upon intercession of American sea Captain W.H. Cunningham of Boston on the ship Courier, Smith was released by Echeandía to reunite with his men. Echeandía ordered Smith and his party to leave California by the same route they entered, forbidding him to travel north along the coast to Bodega Bay but giving Smith permission to purchase needed supplies for an eastern overland return journey. Smith boarded the Courier sailing from San Diego to San Pedro, to meet his men.

After waiting for almost another month for an exit visa and then spending at least two more weeks breaking the horses they had purchased for the return trip, Smith's party departed the mission communities of California in mid-February 1827. The party returned on the path it had arrived, but once outside the Mexican settlements, Smith convinced himself he had complied with Echeandía's order to leave by the same route he had entered, and the party veered north crossing over into the Central Valley. The party ultimately made its way to the Kings River on February 28 and began trapping beaver. The party kept working its way north, encountering hostile Maidus. By early May 1827, Smith and his men had traveled 350 miles (560 km) north looking for the Buenaventura River, but they found no break in the Sierra Nevada range through which it could have flowed from the Rocky Mountains. On December 16, 1826, Smith had written in a letter to the United States ambassador plenipotentiary to Mexico his plans to "follow up on of the largest Riv(ers) that emptied into the (San Francisco) Bay cross the mon (mountains) at its head and from thence to our deposit on the Great Salt Lake" and appeared to be following that plan. They followed the Cosumnes River (the northernmost tributary of the San Joaquin River) upstream, but veered off it to the north and crossed over to the American River, a tributary of the Sacramento that flowed into San Francisco Bay. They tried traveling up the canyon of the South Fork of the American to cross the Sierra Nevada but had to return because of deep snow. (Note: This was Smith's second missed opportunity to find the Humboldt River. Had he completed his crossing this far north, it is possible he would have found the Carson River leading down to Carson Sink and Humboldt Lake in Nevada. He then could have traveled up the Humboldt, the vital waterway making possible a route across the Great Basin Desert later used by California immigrants and forging what would later be known at the "Hastings Cutoff" across the south end of the Great Salt Lake. The Donner Party followed a reverse course of most of this route 19 years later. In late 1828, Peter Skene Ogden discovered the Humboldt River's course.) Unable to find a feasible path for the well-laden party to cross and faced with hostile indigenes, he was forced into a decision: since they did not have time to travel north to the Columbia River and be on time for the 1827 rendezvous, they would backtrack to the Stanislaus River and re-establish a camp there. Smith would take two men and some extra horses to get to the rendezvous as quickly as he could and return to his party with more men later in the year, and the group would continue on to the Columbia.

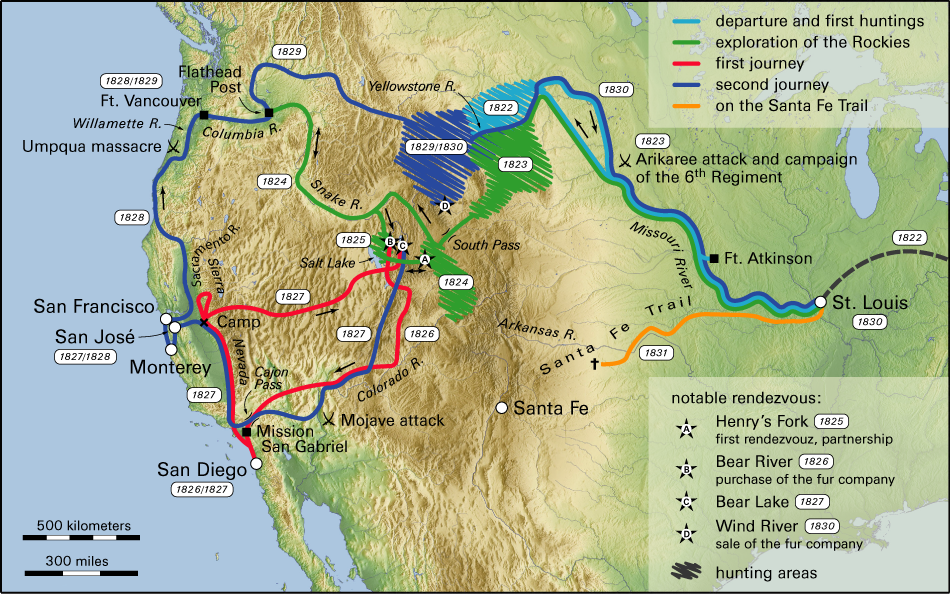
The exploration of the West by Jedediah Smith. The branch of the Sacramento River that is labeled as pointing northeast is now known as the Pit River.

After a difficult crossing of the Sierra Nevada near Ebbetts Pass, Smith and his two men passed around the south end of Walker Lake. After meeting with the only mounted natives that they would encounter until they reached the Salt Lake Valley, (Note: Once having left the foothills of the Sierra Nevada, the lack of water sources and adequate feed prevented the natives from maintaining horses. Smith's own horses deteriorated rapidly on the trip.) they continued east across central Nevada, straight across the Great Basin Desert as the summer heat hit the region. Neither they nor their horses nor mules could find adequate food. As the horses gave out, they were butchered for whatever meat the men could salvage. After two days without water, Robert Evans collapsed near the Nevada–Utah border and could go no farther, but some natives Smith encountered gave them some food and told him where to find water, which he took back to Evans and revived him. (Note: It is around this point that Smith's narrative of his journey was split into two parts, the first found by Sullivan around 1930 and the second by a descendant of Ashley's lawyer in 1967. The portion found by Sullivan starts at this point in the journey.) As the three approached the Great Salt Lake, they again were unable to find water, and Evans collapsed again. Smith and Silas Gobel found a spring and again took back water to Evans. Finally, the men came to the top of a ridge from which they saw the Great Salt Lake to the north, a "joyful sight" to Smith. By this time they had one horse and one mule remaining. They reached and crossed the Jordan River. Local natives told him the whites were gathered farther north at "the Little Lake" (Bear Lake on the border between present-day Utah and Idaho). Smith borrowed a fresh horse from them and rode ahead of the other two men, reaching the rendezvous on July 3. The mountain men celebrated Smith's arrival with a cannon salute, (Note: The cannon, a four-pounder, was sent by Ashley on a carriage, the first wheeled vehicle to cross South Pass.) for they had given him and his party up for lost.

== Third Rendezvous of 1827 and second trip to California, 1827–28 ==
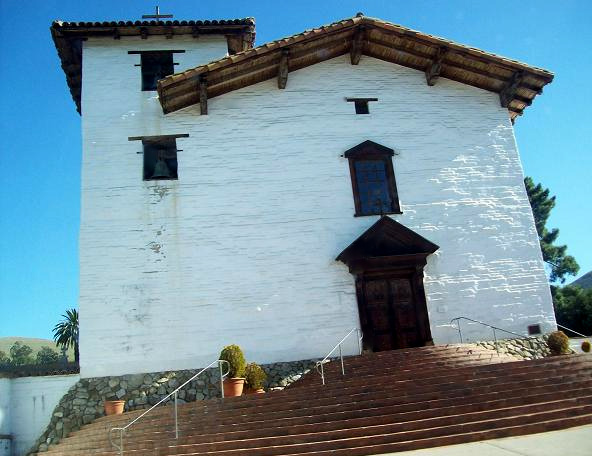
Smith's return to California threatened Mexican authority at Mission San José.

As agreed, Ashley had sent provisions for the rendezvous, and his men took back 7,400 pounds (3,400 kg) of Smith, Jackson & Sublette furs and a letter from Smith to William Clark, then in the office of the Superintendent of Indian Affairs for the region west of the Mississippi River, describing what he had observed the previous year. Smith left to rejoin the men he had left in California almost immediately after the rendezvous. He was accompanied by 18 men and two French-Canadian women, following much of the same route as the previous year. In the ensuing year, the Mojave along the Colorado River who had been so welcoming the previous year had clashed with trappers from Taos and were set on revenge against the whites. While crossing the river, Smith's party was attacked; 10 men, including Silas Gobel, were killed, and the two women were taken captive. Smith and the eight surviving men, one badly wounded from the fighting, prepared to make a desperate stand on the west bank of Colorado River, having made a makeshift breastwork out of trees and fashioned lances by attaching butcher knives to light poles. The men still had five guns among them, and as the Mojave began to approach, Smith ordered his men to fire on those within range. Two Mojaves were shot and killed, one was wounded, and the remaining attackers fled. Before the Mojave could regroup, Smith and eight other surviving men retreated on foot across the Mojave Desert on the Mohave Trail to the San Bernardino Valley.

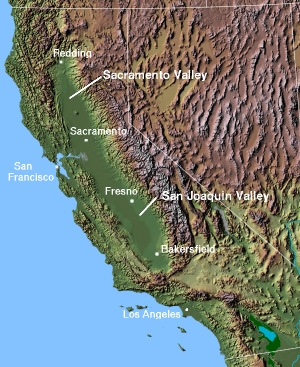
California's Central Valley. Smith and his men explored the southern San Joaquin Valley in 1826–27, and the northern Sacramento Valley in 1828.

Smith and the other survivors were again well received in San Gabriel. The party moved north to meet with the group that had been left in the San Joaquin Valley, reuniting with them on September 19, 1827. Unlike in San Gabriel, they were coolly received by the priests at Mission San José, who had already received warning of Smith's renewed presence in the area. Smith's party also visited the settlements at Monterey and Yerba Buena (San Francisco).

Governor Echeandía, who was at the time in Monterey (capital of Alta California), once again arrested Smith, this time along with his men. Yet despite the breach of trust, the governor once again released Smith after several English-speaking residents vouched for him, including John B. R. Cooper and William Edward Petty Hartnell in Monterey. After posting a $30,000 bond, Smith received a passport, on the same promise – to leave the province immediately and not to return. Also as before, Smith and his party remained in California hunting in the Sacramento Valley for several months. (Note: Most notably along the American River, which was named for the party.) Upon reaching the northern edge of the valley, the party scouted the route to the northeast afforded by the Pit River but determined it to be impassable, (Note: This determination was probably the end of Smith's belief in the possibility that what Luis Antonio Argüello had called the Buenaventura, the Sacramento River, flowed from the Great Salt Lake region.) so veered northwest toward the Pacific coast to find the Columbia River and return to the Rocky Mountain region. Jedediah Smith became the first explorer to reach the Oregon Country overland by traveling north on the California coast.

=== Trip to the Oregon Country ===
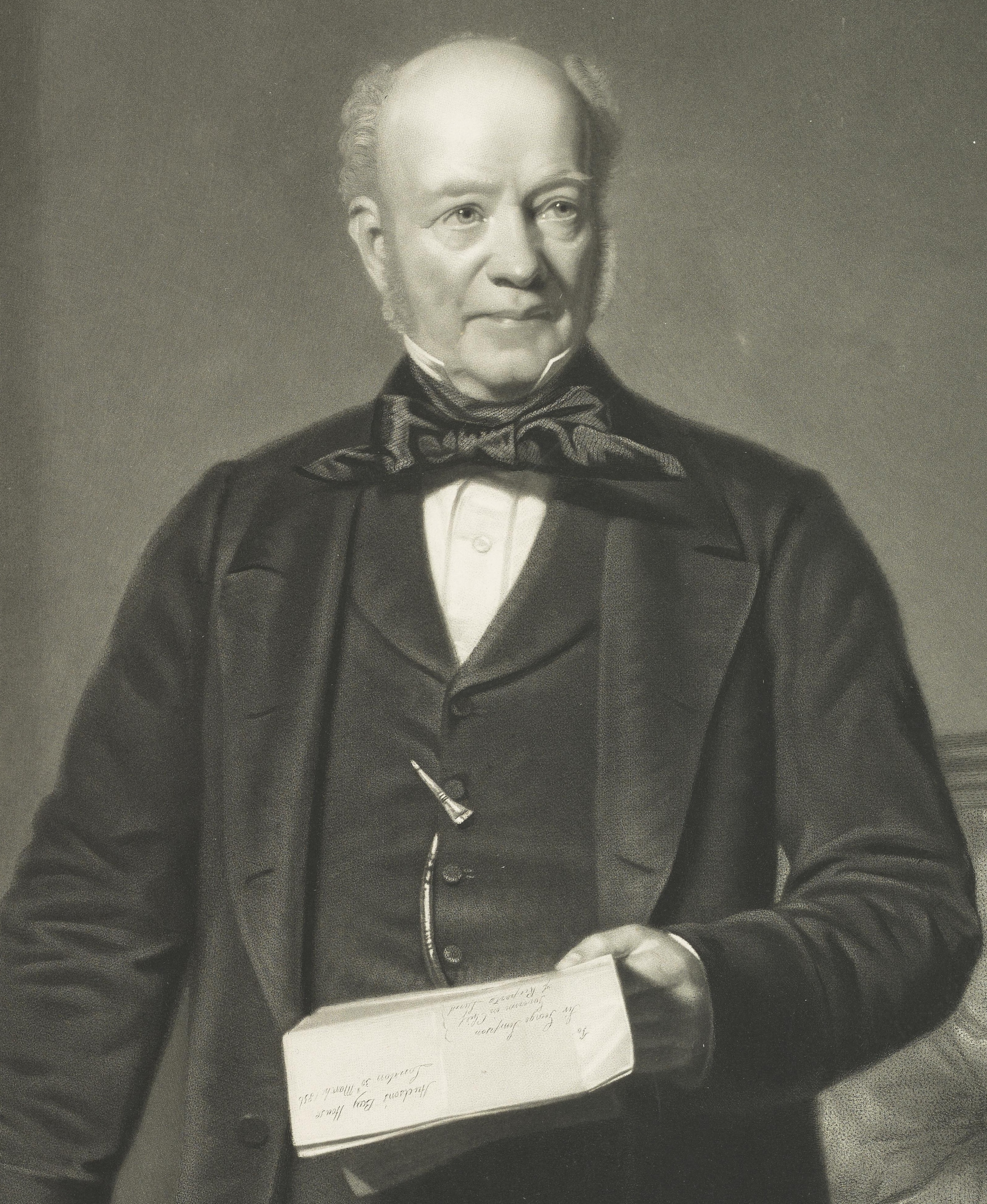
Smith met with George Simpson, Governor-in-Chief of the HBC, at Fort Vancouver, after the Umpqua massacre.

When Smith's party left Mexican Alta California and entered the Oregon Country, the Treaty of 1818 allowed joint occupation between Britain and the United States. In the Oregon Country, Smith's party, then numbering 19 and over 250 horses, (Note: Smith bought the wild Spanish horses in California in hopes of selling them in the Rocky Mountains for a profit. He had learned the previous year that horses in California were so plentiful that the rancheros (owners of Ranchos) would round up hundreds of them into an enclosure, take out the best, and leave the rest to starve to death. Smith was disgusted by the practice but saw a chance at profit. The next year, after having lost so many men at the Colorado River, he wanted to hire more in California for the trip north, but Mexican officials forbade this. In defiance of the orders, Smith hired Richard Leland who was an excellent horseman.) came into contact with the Umpqua people. The tribes along the coast had monitored the party's progress, passing news of conflicts between the group and indigenes, and the Umpqua were wary. One member of Smith's party, Harrison Rogers, described a conflict between the party and the Umpqua that took place on July 11:

"Had several Inds. along; one of the Ind. stole an ax and we were obliged to seize him for the purpose of tying him before we could scare him to make him give it up. Capt. Smith and one of them caught him and put a cord round his neck, and the rest of us stood with our guns ready in case they made any resistance, there was about 50 Inds. present but did not pretend to resist tying the other."

On July 14, 1828, while Smith, John Turner and Richard Leland were scouting a trail north, his group was attacked in its camp on the Umpqua River by a group of Umpqua people.

On the night of August 8, 1828, Arthur Black arrived at the gate of Hudson's Bay Company (HBC) post at Fort Vancouver, exhausted and almost destitute of clothing. He believed himself to be the only survivor of the men at camp but did not know of the fate of Smith and the two others. Chief Factor John McLoughlin, superintendent at the fort, sent word to the local tribes that they would be rewarded if they brought Smith and his men to the fort unharmed, and began organizing a search party for them. Smith and the two others, having been alerted to the attack, had climbed a hill above the camp and witnessed the massacre; they arrived at Fort Vancouver on August 10, two days after Black. (Note: Several early sources stated that only three men survived the massacre. However, McLoughlin had documented that Black had arrived two days before "Smith arrived with two men". James Nesmith stated in 1880 that "Smith, John Turner, and the other man, name unknown, who had been absent from the camp" had avoided the attack. Neihardt had documented that one source stated that Smith went off with "a little Englishman" that morning, but confusion over the identity of the fourth survivor ceased when Smith's narrative, found by Maurice Sullivan around 1930, corrected the name of Richard Leland (previously documented as "Richard Taylor" and "Richard Laughlin"), an Englishman who Smith met in California and who joined the party in December 1827. allowing Sullivan to determine he was the third Smith man in the canoe, Leland's survival was later confirmed by Dale Morgan.)

McLoughlin sent Alexander McLeod south with Smith, Black, Turner, and Leland, and 37 HBC men to rescue any other men that had been in the camp that had possibly survived, (Note: Some early versions written about the incident stated that Smith had gone off by himself and that Turner and/or Leland had been at camp, fought their way out with a burning log and met up with Smith en route to Fort Vancouver. This appears to be based on Turner's experience in a subsequent massacre. The currently accepted version is that Turner and Leland were in the canoe with Smith and avoided the attack. A discussion of the versions can be found in Don Whereat's Our Culture and History.) and their goods. After recovering several horses in bad condition, Black and Leland remained with some HBC men to care for them, and the HBC horses and Smith, Turner, and 18 HBC men proceeded to the massacre site. On October 28, they reached it and found 11 decomposed bodies, which they buried. (Note: From their earlier communications with the indigenes they had encountered, they had hopes that 4 men had survived the massacre and where in the hands of the "Cahoose Indians", but as no trace of them was found elsewhere, their bodies had possibly been swept away by the river while trying to escape the massacre.) They ultimately confirmed that all 4 of the unaccounted-for men had died and recovered 700 beaver pelts, 50 river otter pelts, 4 sea otter pelts, and 39 horses, as well as Harrison Rogers' journals. (Note: Rogers was Smith's clerk. He had accompanied Smith to California on the 1825 trip and was left in charge during the four months Smith was gone to the 1827 rendezvous. After Smith's death, Rogers' journals ended up in Ashley's hands. Ashley's grand-niece donated them to the Missouri Historical Society and were the source of much early information about Smith's travels.)

On October 25, 1828, while McLeod's recovery expedition was in the field, HBC Governor George Simpson coincidentally arrived at Fort Vancouver on an inspection tour. When Smith returned, he and Simpson negotiated the purchase of the recovered property by the HBC. Simpson estimated that the recovery expedition had cost the Company £1,000 (Note: equivalent to $4,444 at the time, £94,008 in 2025, and $130,290 in 2025) in lost revenue, and the salaries of the HBC men who spent three months on the trip cost an additional £171, (Note: equivalent to $760 at the time, £16,075 in 2025, and $22,282 in 2025) yet HBC turned the recovered property over to Smith at no charge. Then Simpson paid Smith generous prices for the recovered furs and horses, totaling £582, (Note: equivalent to $2,587 at the time, £54,713 in 2025, and $75,846 in 2025) and added a lump-sum bonus of £400; (Note: equivalent to $1,778 at the time, £37,603 in 2025, and $52,128 in 2025) the payment totaled £982. (Note: equivalent to $4,365 at the time, £92,316 in 2025, and $127,974 in 2025) In return, Smith apparently agreed that the firm of Smith, Jackson, and Sublette would confine its operations to the region east of the Great Divide. Smith remained at Fort Vancouver until March 12, 1829, when he and Arthur Black traveled up the Columbia River with the HBC's York Factory Express to Fort Colvile, where they acquired horses and supplies for the trip east to meet up with his partners in Pierre's Hole, on the west side of the Grand Tetons.

=== Blackfeet expedition, 1829–30 ===
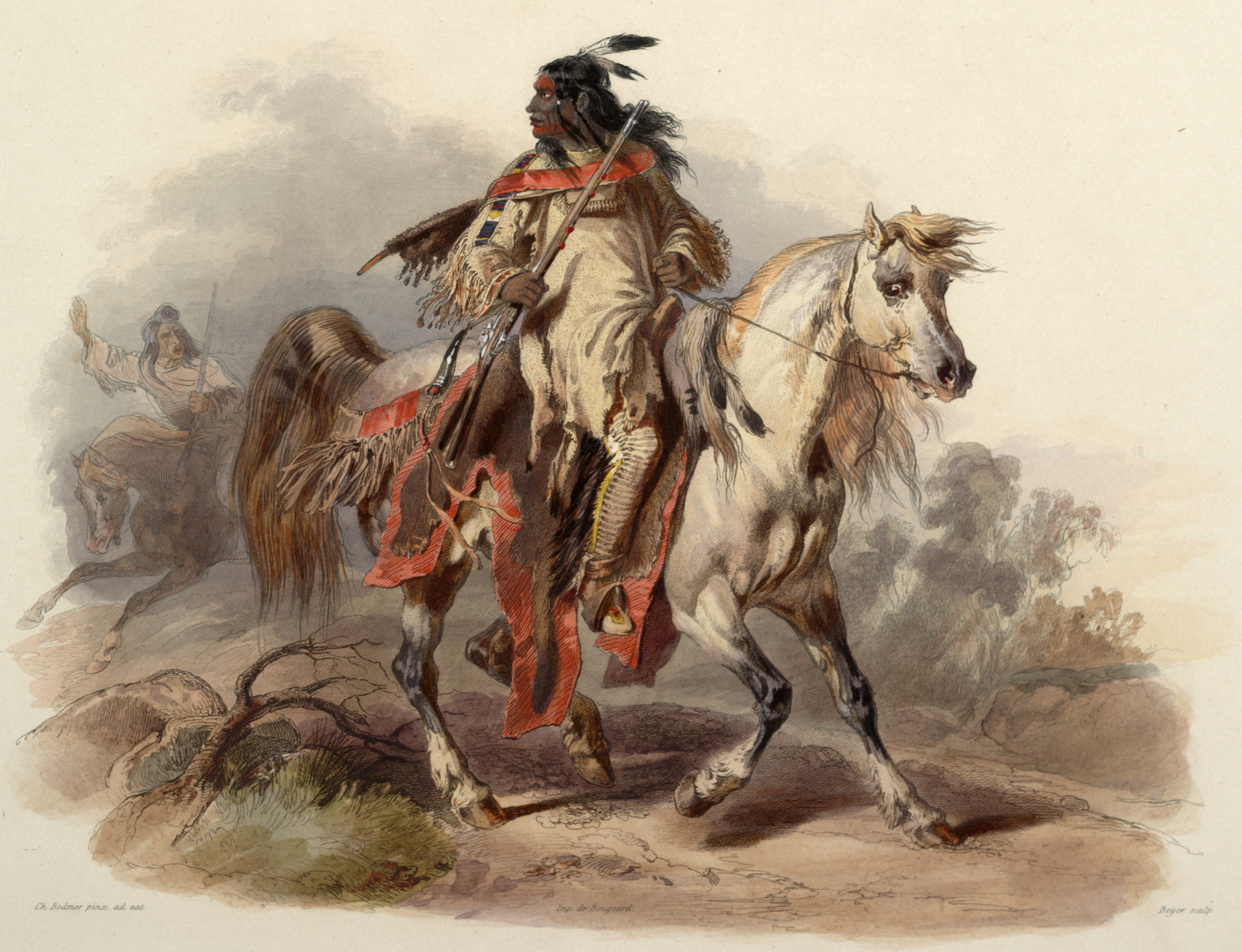
Blackfoot warrior Bodmer (1840–1843)

In 1829, Captain Smith personally organized a fur trade expedition into the Blackfeet territory. Smith was able to capture a good quantity of beaver pelts before being repulsed by hostile Blackfeet. Jim Bridger served as a riverboat pilot on the Powder River during the profitable expedition. In the four years of western fur trapping, Smith, Jackson, and Sublette were able to make a substantial profit and, at the 1830 rendezvous on the Wind River, they sold their company to Tom Fitzpatrick, Milton Sublette, Jim Bridger, Henry Fraeb, and John Baptiste Gervais who renamed it the Rocky Mountain Fur Company.

=== Return to St. Louis ===
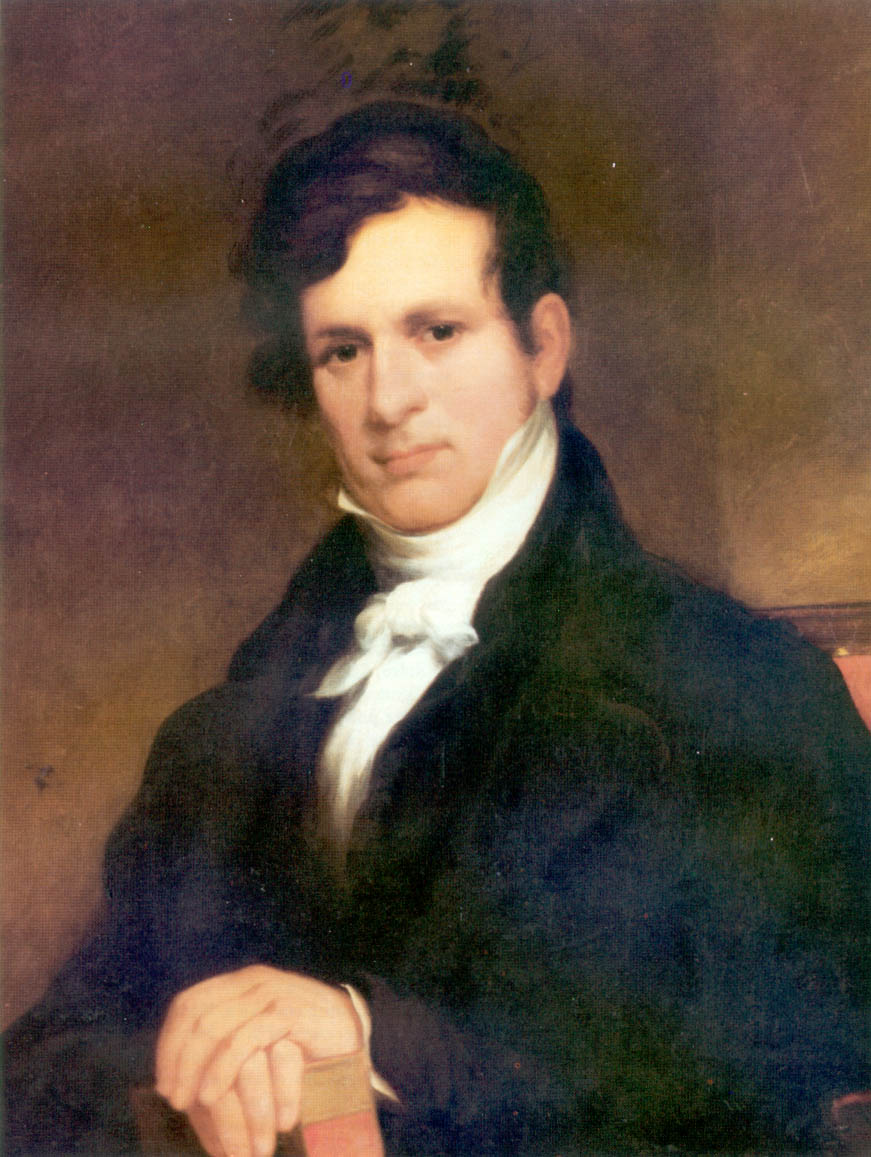
Secretary of War John H. Eaton

After Smith's return to St. Louis in 1830, he and his partners wrote a letter on October 29 to Secretary of War Eaton, who at the time was involved in a notorious Washington cabinet scandal known as the Petticoat Affair and informed Eaton of the "military implications" of the British allegedly alienating the indigene population towards any American trappers in the Pacific Northwest. According to biographer Dale L. Morgan, Smith's letter was "a clear sighted statement of the national interest". The letter also included a description of Fort Vancouver and described how the British were in the process of making a new fort at the time of Smith's visit in 1829. Smith believed the British were attempting to establish a permanent settlement in the Oregon Country.

Smith had not forgotten the financial struggles of his family in Ohio. After making a sizable profit from the sale of furs, over $17,000 (more than $513,984 in 2025) Smith sent $1,500 (equivalent to $45,352 in 2025) to his family in Green Township, whereupon his brother Ralph bought a farm. Smith also bought a house on First Avenue in St. Louis to be shared with his brothers. Smith bought two African slaves to take care of the property in St. Louis.

The partners' busy schedules in St. Louis also found them and Samuel Parkman making a map of their discoveries in the West, to which Smith was the major contributor. On March 2, 1831, Smith wrote another letter to Eaton, now a few months away from resigning because of the Petticoat Affair, referencing the map and requesting to launch a federally funded exploration expedition similar to the Lewis & Clark expedition. (Note: President Andrew Jackson, opposed federal funding for western overland exploration during his first term, but relented during his second term creating United States Exploring Expedition in May 1836.) Smith requested that Reuben Holmes, a West Point graduate and military officer, would lead the expedition.

Smith and his partners were also preparing to join into the supply trade known as the "commerce of the prairies". At the request of William H. Ashley, Smith Jackson and Sublette received a passport from Senator Thomas Hart Benton on March 3, 1831, the day after Smith wrote his letter to Eaton, and they began forming a company of 74 men, twenty-two wagons, and a "six-pounder" artillery cannon for protection.

== Death ==
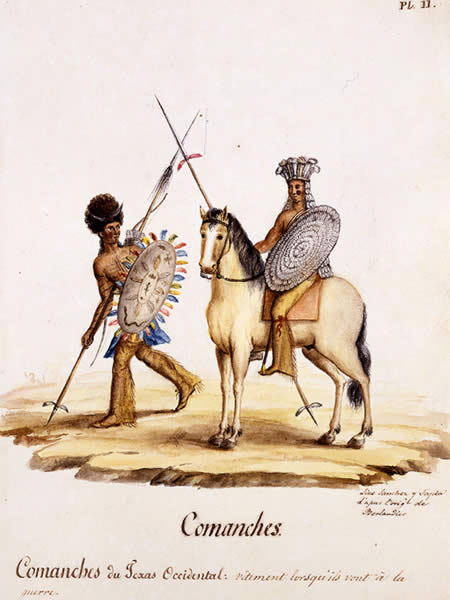
Comanches as depicted in the 1830s. Painting by Lino Sánchez y Tapia (1830s).

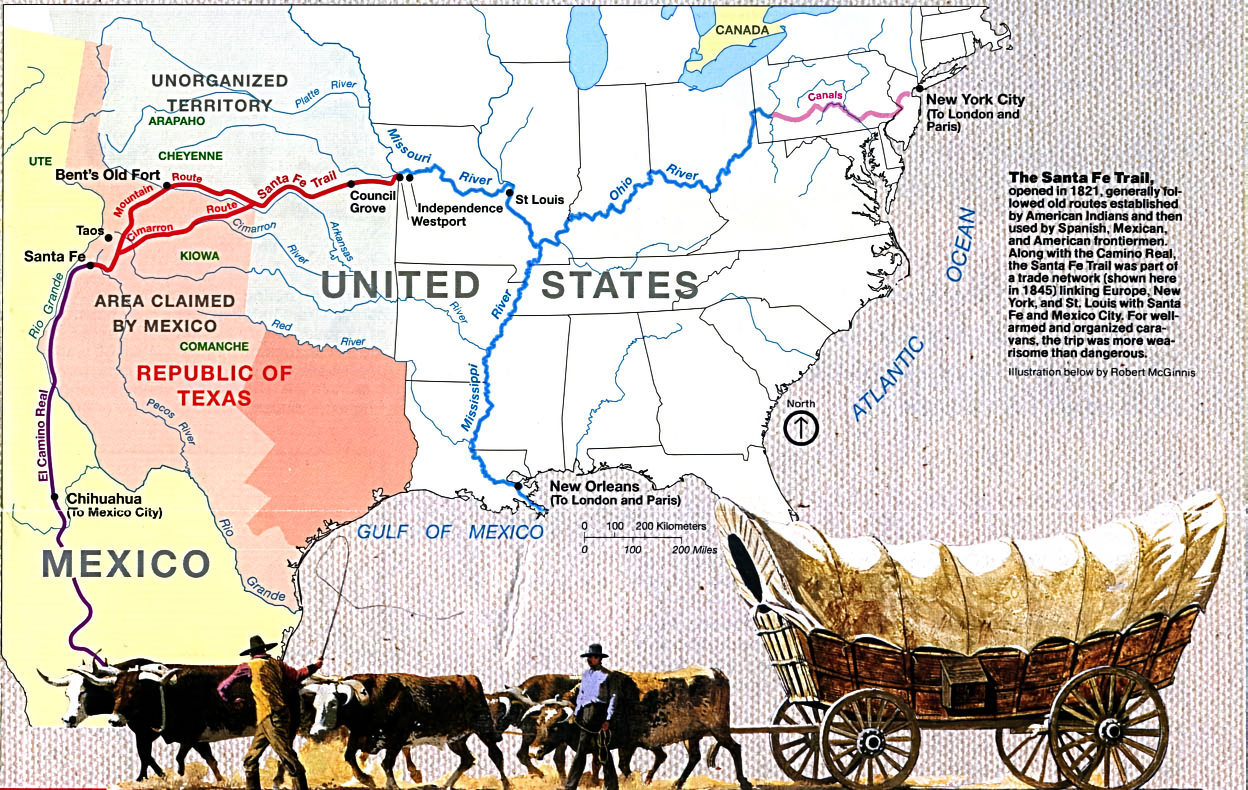
The Santa Fe Trail

Having no response from Eaton, Smith joined his partners and left St. Louis to trade in Santa Fe on April 10, 1831. Smith was leading the caravan on the Santa Fe Trail on May 27, 1831, when he left the group to scout for water near the Lower Spring on the Cimarron River in present-day southwest Kansas. He never returned to the group. The remainder of the party proceeded on to Santa Fe hoping Smith would rendezvous with them, but he never did. They arrived in Santa Fe on July 4, 1831, and shortly thereafter members of the party discovered a comanchero with some of Smith's personal belongings. It was relayed that Smith had encountered and communicated with a group of Comancheros just prior to his approaching a group of Comanche people who lived there. Smith tried to negotiate with the Comanche defense party, but they surrounded him in preparation for an attack.

Most likely, the death of Jedediah Smith occurred in Northern Mexico Territory, south of present-day Ulysses, Grant County, Kansas at Wagon Bed Spring. None of his colleagues were witness to his death and the following accounts are conjectural or imagined, although possibly based on hearsay and third-hand information. According to Smith's grand-nephew, Ezra Delos Smith, there were 20 Comanche soldiers in the group. Smith attempted to conciliate with them until the Comanches scared his horse and shot him in the left shoulder with an arrow. Smith fought back, ultimately killing the chief of the warriors. (Note: The number of indigenes killed by Smith was most certainly embellished over the years. Another account of Smith's death is that found in his obituary. "Some indians" trapped Smith in a box canyon, he was shot with a bullet, not an arrow, and upon that he shot both the chief and the man behind him with the "same ball".) The version written by Austin Smith, Jedediah's brother, in a letter to their brother Ira four months after Jedediah's death says that Jedediah had killed the "head Chief," but nothing about any other Comanche being wounded or killed. Josiah Gregg wrote in 1844 that Smith "struggled bravely to the last; and, as the Indians themselves have since related, killed two or three of their party before he was overpowered." (Note: Another later version stated that three Comanche were killed.) Ezra Delos Smith stated that his grand-uncle had fought so valiantly that the Comanche believed "he had been more than mortal, and that he could be immortal it would be better to propitiate his spirit; so they did not mutilate his body, but later gave it the same funeral rites they gave its chief" (Note: Ed Lewis, a descendant of an early Kansas rancher, tells a story of the skeletal remains of two men found on his grandfather's property along the Cimarron River, which he speculated were Smith and the Comanche chief. That, as well as the fact that a search two days later had found no sign of Smith's body give some credence to Ezra Smith's version.) Austin Smith, who along with another Smith brother, Peter, was a member of the caravan, was able to retrieve Jedediah Smith's rifle and pistols that the Indians had taken and traded to the Comancheros. (Note: At some point, Peter Smith had taken possession of one of Smith's pistols, as it was in the possession of his daughter, Jedediah's niece, in the late 1800s. It was ultimately stolen in 1961. See)

== Aftermath ==
In the aftermath of Smith's death, President Andrew Jackson, during his second term in 1836, launched the federally-funded oceanic United States Exploring Expedition, led by Charles Wilkes, from 1838 to 1842. One of the expedition's accomplishments was the exploration of the Pacific Northwest and to lay claim on the Oregon Country, which Smith had previously explored, dominated by the British Hudson's Bay Company at Fort Vancouver on the Columbia River. The federally-funded overland exploration of the West that Smith had requested in 1831 took place starting in 1842 commanded by Lieutenant John C. Frémont under President John Tyler and President James K. Polk. It was Frémont's first two documented and published explorations of the West during the 1840s that opened the West to American expansion. Frémont was popularly known as the Pathfinder until the late 19th century, while Smith's life and reputation were nearly forgotten by his countrymen. In 1846, the disputed joint occupancy of Britain and the United States of the Oregon Country where Smith stayed at Fort Vancouver was ended by the Oregon Treaty. In 1848, Mexico ceded California (where Smith had twice been arrested by Governor Echeandía) to the United States under the Treaty of Guadalupe Hidalgo, ending the Mexican–American War.

== Personal characteristics and beliefs ==
Jedediah Smith had a dry, not raucous, sense of humor and was not known to use the profanity common to his peers. Smith's immediate family were practicing Christians; his younger brother Benjamin was named after a Methodist circuit preacher, and his letters indicate his own Christian beliefs. Barton H. Barbour asserted in 2009 that the legend of Smith as a "Bible-toter" and a missionary grew only after his death, and that assertions that he carried a Bible with him in the wilderness have no basis in any accounts by him or his companions. Further, that the only documentation of any public demonstration of faith was a prayer said at the burial of one of the Arikara massacre victims. (Note: There have even have been doubts raised about that episode. It was documented that "Mr. Smith" spoke the prayer, but there were three Smiths in the party.) However, the 2023 biography, Throne of Grace, indicates Smith to be deeply religious. While he rarely attended church, "it was said of him he made the mountaintop his confessional, the forest glade his altar." As such, author Tom Clavin describes Smith's life as a kind of parable illustrate God's munificence to any man willing to keep the Christian faith through the many trials. All accounts of Smith describe him as strongly self-controlled, never drinking alcohol to excess (Note: Part of the legend of Smith's character is that he never used tobacco, but he carried it and a pipe with him. In the narratives of his travels, he speaks of offering it to the Natives he encounters) or bedding Native American women, indicating he had the discipline often associated with a strict moral code. He owned at least two slaves, which conflicted with his northern Methodist upbringing, and his behavior was not always honorable when dealing with those he considered his antagonists. He was known to be physically strong, cool under pressure, extremely skilled at surviving in the wild, and possessed extraordinary leadership skills. Smith's true character is an enigma open to interpretation.

=== Views of Native Americans ===
While traveling throughout the American West, Smith's policy with the Native Americans was to maintain friendly relations with gifts and exchanges, learning from their cultures. As he traveled through northern California for the first time, then part of Mexican territory Alta California, he tried to maintain that policy, but the situation quickly deteriorated. The Maidu were fearful and defensive, and Smith's men killed at least seven of them upon his orders when they refused peaceful advances and demonstrated aggressive behaviors. He later wrote that they were "the lowest intermediate link between man and the Brute creation". Later, during his trek across the Great Basin, he said of the desert indigenes he came upon "children of nature...unintelligent type of beings...They form a connecting link between the animal and intellectual creation..." (Note: The Maidus and the Great Basin Indians came to be known by the somewhat derogatory term "Diggers". Having never developed horse cultures and living in harsh environments, they compared poorly to the Plains Indians when observed by early explorers and settlers. Smith's assessment of the Great Basin indigenes is harsh, considering they probably saved his life more than once as he crossed the desert.) Upon returning to Mexican California, even after suffering the Mojave massacre, he continued to try to maintain good relations, punishing two of his men, albeit lightly, who had unnecessarily killed one native and wounded another. But as the party continued north, the natives continued the aggressive actions, and Smith's men wounded at least two more and three were killed. By the time the party reached the Umpqua River in the British-American shared Oregon Country, their tolerance was at an ebb, leading to the ax incident and resulting in disastrous consequences.

== Historical reputation ==
Smith for the most part was forgotten by his countrymen as a historical figure for over 75 years after his death. In 1853, Peter Skene Ogden (Note: Ogden probably got a first-hand account of the massacre from Smith after Smith arrived at Fort Vancouver, then left shortly afterward on his excursion in which he discovered the Humboldt River.) had written about the Umpqua massacre in Traits of American Indian Life and Character by a Fur Trader, and the Oregon Pioneers Association and Hubert Howe Bancroft wrote versions of it in 1876 and 1886, respectively. There are mentions of him in memoirs by other fur trappers, and mentions by George Gibbs and F. V. Hayden in their reports. Recollection of a Septuagenarian by William Waldo, published by the Missouri Historical Society in 1880, discussed Smith, focusing on hearsay evidence of his piety. There was no mention of Smith in the 1891 volume 5 publication of Appletons' Cyclopædia of American Biography edited by James Grant Wilson and John Fiske. The first known publication solely about Smith was in the 1896 Annual Publication of the Historical Society of Southern California. In 1902, Hiram M. Chittenden wrote of him extensively in The American Fur Trade of the West The same year Frederick Samuel Dellenbaugh wrote about Smith's exploits with the Mojave Indians in his book The Romance of the Colorado River: The Story of Its Discovery in 1540 with an Account of Later Explorations. (Note: Dellenbaugh wrote extensively about Smith in 1905 and again mentioned Smith in his 1914 book Fremont and '49.) Smith, however, again was not listed in the 1906 volume 9 publication of American Biographical Society's Biographical Dictionary of America, edited by Rossiter Johnson. In 1908, John G. Neihardt and Doane Robinson lamented the obscurity of Smith; afterward, more extensive efforts were initiated to publicize his accomplishments.

In 1912, an article about Smith written by a grand-nephew, Ezra Delos Smith of Meade, Kansas, was published by the Kansas Historical Society. Five years later, Smith's status as a historical figure was further revived by Harrison Clifford Dale's (Note: Dale, 1885–1969, was a professor at the University of Wyoming.) book, The Ashley-Smith Explorations and the Discovery of a Central Route to the Pacific, 1822–1829: With the Original Journals, published in 1918. During the 1920s, Maurice S. Sullivan traced descendants of Smith's siblings and found two portions of the narrative of Smith's travels, written in the hand of Samuel Parkman (Note: Sullivan's notes on Smith are archived in the University of the Pacific Library. They apparently had been acquired by Dale Morgan, and after Morgan's death were donated to the library.) who had been hired to assist in compiling the document after Smith's return to St. Louis in 1830. The narrative's impending publication had been announced in a St. Louis newspaper as late as 1840, (Note: The announcement had stated that the "work" would "take in" nine years of Smith's travels, presumably from 1821 until his 1830 return to St. Louis.) but never happened. In 1934, Sullivan published the remnants, documenting Smith's travels in 1821 and 1822 and from June 1827 until the Umpqua massacre a year later, in The Travels of Jedediah Smith, giving a new documented perspective of Smith's explorations. (Note: The narrative was based in part on journals Smith kept, and many of the activities described have specific dates. Smith's journal from the time he left the rendezvous on July 13, 1827, until the Mohave massacre was lost during that tragedy, and that time period was reconstructed in general terms, as was the 1821 and 1822 time period. The daily entries did not recommence until November 7, 1827.) Along with the narrative, Sullivan published the portion of Alexander McLeod's journal documenting the search for any surviving members of Smith's party and the recovery of his property after the Umpquah massacre. The Dictionary of American Biography, Volume 17, edited by Dumas Malone, published in 1935, contains an article on Smith authored by Joseph Schafer. The next year, the first comprehensive biography of Smith: Jedediah Smith: Trader and Trail Breaker by Sullivan was posthumously published, but it was Dale Morgan's book, Jedediah Smith and the Opening of the West, published in 1953, that established Smith as an authentic American hero whose explorations were overshadowed by the Lewis and Clark Expedition.

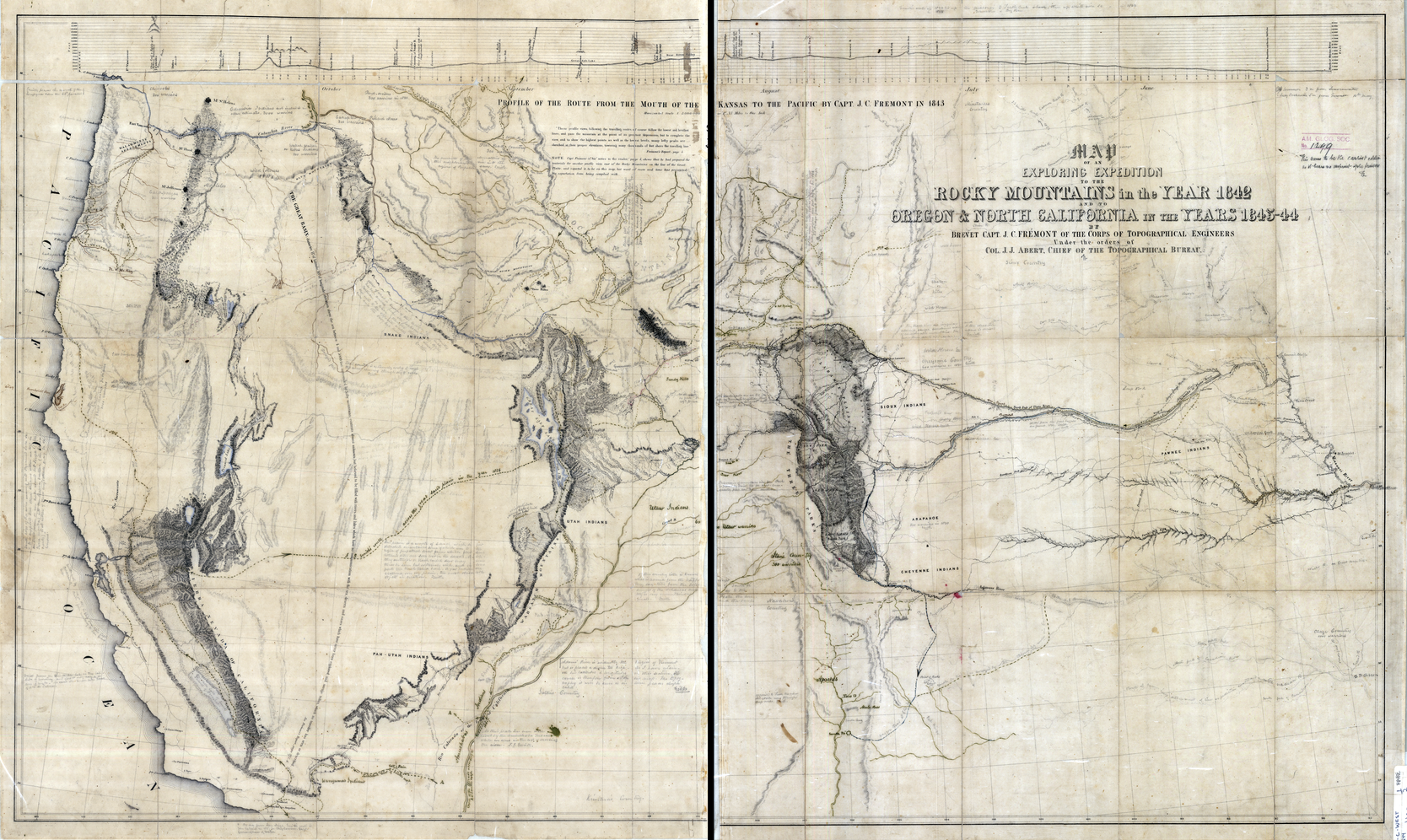
Frémont-Gibbs-Smith map

According to Maurice S. Sullivan, (Note: Sullivan, 1893–1935, was a New Jersey newspaperman who moved to California in the early 1920s and developed an interest in Smith.) Smith was "the first white man to cross the future state of Nevada, the first to conquer the High Sierra of California, and the first to explore the entire Pacific Slope from Lower California to the banks of the Columbia River". He was known for his many systematic recorded observations on nature and topography. His expeditions also raised doubts about the existence of the legendary Buenaventura River. Jedediah Smith's explorations were the main basis for accurate Pacific West maps. He and his partners, Jackson and Sublette, produced a map that, in a eulogy for Smith printed in the Illinois Monthly Magazine for June 1832, the unknown author (Note: In 2013, Joe J. Molter, editor of Castor Canadensis, the journal of the Jedediah Smith Society speculated that the author was James Hall, editor of Illinois Monthly Magazine) claimed: "This map is now probably the best extant, of the Rocky Mountains, and the country on both sides, from the States to the Pacific." This map has been called "a landmark in mapping of the American West" The original map is lost, its content was overlaid and annotated by George Gibbs on an 1845 base map by John C. Frémont, which is on file at the American Geographical Society Library, at the University of Wisconsin-Milwaukee. (Note: The "Fremont-Gibbs-Smith" map was "found" in 1954 by Carl I Wheat at the library's former location in New York City.)

== Author of journal ==
Another important piece of the Jedediah Smith story was discovered in 1967, when another portion of the 1830–31 narrative (again in Parkman's hand) was found amongst other historical papers in an attic in St. Louis. This portion documented Smith's first California trip (1826–27), and immediately preceded the portion of the narrative found by Sullivan 35 years earlier. George R. Brooks (Note: George Brooks, 1929–2006, St. Louis author and editor) edited and introduced the narrative portion, along with the first "journal" of Smith companion Harrison Rogers, (Note: Rogers' first surviving journal was in two segments; an accounting ledger with a narrative that began abruptly on November 27, 1826, and ended as abruptly on December 20, 1826, and then a second segment that starts again on January 1, 1827, and ends on January 28. Brooks only published this first journal and stated that Smith likely used it as a reference in preparing the 1830–31 narrative. Some of the missing pages are probably "the journal" Smith gave to the Spanish officials to try to convince them of his party's innocent intentions since the detail in the Parkman narrative indicates Smith and Parkman had access to Smith's notes of the group's travels from the time it left in August 1826 until reaching California. Rogers' second journal starts on May 10, 1828, and continued to document the excursion until he was killed in the Umpqua massacre. The lapse of entries from January 1827 until May 1828 may have been due to a lack of paper or there may have been other journals that were lost in the massacre. Harrison Dale published both recovered journals in 1918.) in 1977.

== Legacy ==
=== Geographic namesakes ===
Smith's exploration of northwestern California and southern Oregon resulted in two rivers, the Smith River (California) and Smith River (Oregon) being named for him. (Note: Smith originally named what he thought to be an unnamed river after himself, but due to a mistake in geography (later corrected by George Gibbs), it turned out the river was actually the Klamath. His name was therefore attached to a smaller river to the north just south of California's border with Oregon, and also to the branch of the Umpqua River whose mouth was near the massacre site and where it was rumored to be his place of death.) Smith's Fork of the Bear River, in southwest Wyoming, is named for him. and Smith's Fork of Blacks Fork of the Green River may also be named for him. The Jedediah Smith Wilderness in Wyoming bears his name. Smith Valley, NV is not named after him, see Geology and Water Resources of Smith Valley, Lyon and Douglas Counties Nevada 1953

=== Honorary commemorations ===
- Jedediah Smith Redwoods State Park and Jedediah Smith Campground in California
- Jedediah Smith Visitor Center located in the Jedediah Smith Redwoods State Park
- Smith River, along with the North Fork Smith River, Middle Fork Smith River and South Fork Smith River, flows from the Klamath Mountains to the Pacific Ocean through Jedediah Smith Redwoods State Park in Del Norte County, California
- Jedediah Smith Memorial Trail, a 32-mile-long (51 km) trail between Sacramento and Folsom, California (Note: A photo of the trail marker commemorating Smith can be seen here.)
- Jedediah Smith Wilderness, 123,451 acres (499.59 km2) within Caribou-Targhee National Forest in Teton County, Wyoming
- Dodge City Trail of Fame, inductee
- Jedediah Strong Smith's Route 1823, historic monument in South Dakota
- California Outdoors Hall of Fame, 2006 inductee
- Jedediah Smith Muzzleloaders Gun Club
- Jedediah Smith Road, Temecula, California
- Hall of Great Westerners, 1964 inductee, National Cowboy & Western Heritage Museum
- Jed Smith Ultra Classic marathon, Sacramento, California
- Jedediah Smith Memorial, San Dimas, California
- Jedediah Smith Chapter, National Society Daughters of the American Revolution, Apple Valley, California
- Jedediah Smith historic trails
- Jedediah Smith Society, founded in 1957 to preserve the history of Jedediah Smith
- Museum of the Mountain Man

=== In popular culture ===
- Jedediah Smith – Frontier Legend (documentary)
- In 2005, Steven Spielberg produced the mini-series, Into the West, where American actor Josh Brolin portrays Jedediah Smith, and the dramatized grizzly bear mauling shows the graphic hanging and sewing back on of the lacerated scalp of Smith.
- Taming the Wild West: The Legend of Jedediah Smith (2005) reenactment documentary; Smith is portrayed by Sean Galuszka; directed by Diana Zaslaw
- Mentioned in the 1984 movie Red Dawn; the main character played by Patrick Swayze was named Jed, and the character says he was named after Smith.
- Jedediah Smith is featured in the documentary America's Westward Expansion.
- Jedediah Smith – Old West Legend (Wild West frontier history documentary)
- Jedediah Smith – Into the West (documentary)
- Jedediah Smith – Story of Us Jedediah Smith – Old West Legend
- Jedediah Strong Smith – Path Through History (documentary)
- Legacy of the Mountain Men (documentary)

== Works cited ==
- Barbour, Barton H. (2011). Jedediah Smith: No Ordinary Mountain Man. Norman: University of Oklahoma Press. ISBN 978-0-8061-4196-1.
- Buckley, Jay H. (2008). William Clark: Indian Diplomat. Norman: University of Oklahoma Press. ISBN 978-0-8061-3911-1.
- Camp, Charles L. (2013) [1973]. Molter, Joe J. (ed.). "Jedediah Smith's First Far-Western Expedition" (PDF). Castor Canadensis. Stockton, CA: Jedediah Smith Society, University of the Pacific.
- Holloway, Thomas H. (2018). "'Now We Go': Snake Country Freemen and the Desertions of May 1825". The Rocky Mountain Fur Trade Journal. 12: 37–72.
- Holloway, Thomas H. (2023). "Killing Competition with Kindness: Jedediah Smith, George Simpson, and the Aftermath of the Umpqua Massacre". The Rocky Mountain Fur Trade Journal. 17: 1–22.
- Lahey, D.T. (2011). George Simpson: Blaze of Glory (E-book). Dundurn. ISBN 978-1-4597-1547-9.
- Morgan, Dale L. (1964) [1953]. Jedediah Smith and the Opening of the American West. Bison Book. Lincoln, London: University of Nebraska Books. ISBN 0-8032-5138-6.
- Morgan, Dale L.; Wheat, Carl I. (1954). Jedediah Smith and his Maps of the American West. San Francisco: California Historical Society.
- Neihardt, John G. (1970). The Splendid Wayfaring: Jedediah Smith And The Ashley-Henry Men, 1822-1831. Bison Books. ISBN 978-0-8032-5723-8.
- Philbrick, Nathaniel (January 2004). "The United States Exploring Expedition, 1838-1842". library.si.edu. Smithsonian Libraries.
- Schafer, Joseph (1935). "Smith, Jedediah Strong". In Dumas Malone (ed.). Dictionary of American Biography. New York: Charles Scribner's Sons. pp. 290–291.
- Smith, Jedediah Strong; Rogers, Harrison G.; Ashley, William Henry (1992) [1918]. Dale, Clifford (ed.). The Ashley-Smith Explorations and the Discovery of a Central Route to the Pacific, 1822–1829: with the original journals. Cleveland, OH: Arthur H. Clark Co. OL 23279123M.
- Smith, Jedediah S.; McLeod, Alexander R. (1992) [1934]. Maurice S. Sullivan (ed.). The Travels of Jedediah Smith; A Documentary Outline, Including his Journal. Lincoln: University of Nebraska Press. ISBN 0-8032-9206-6.
- Weber, David J. (1982). The Mexican Frontier, 1821–1846: The American Southwest Under Mexico. University of New Mexico Press. ISBN 0-8263-0602-0.
