= John Gray (trapper) =

Fur trader

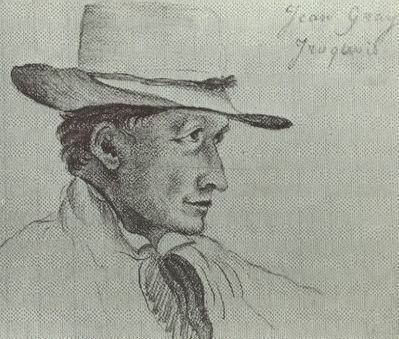
Sketch of John Gray Iroquois Trapper sometime between 1820-1841

John Gray (aka Ignace Hatchiorauquasha) was born in Cambridge New York in 1795, and raised in Akwesasne (St. Regis), New York, was a half-Iroquois half-Scottish American fur trader. Gray helped to establish several new towns on the western frontier of the United States during his lifetime.

His father, William Gray, was Scottish but lived in the Mohawk town and operated a mill.

John began his trapping career working for the Hudson Bay Company (HBC). As a trapper he traveled much of the west. HBC credited the trappers outfitting expenses which they were expected to pay back in furs. However the Iroquois expressed that the fees were much too high. Gray became approximately ten trapping seasons worth of furs in debt to the company. In 1821 he convinced several of his fellow Iroquois trappers to leave and join the competing Rocky Mountain Fur Company. During this time, he traveled with his wife and daughter. John gained a reputation as a capable guide and fighter. He was highly regarded for his skills as a hunter and killed several bears. In 1825 he became an independent fur trader alongside several of the Iroquois that had also worked for Rocky Mountain Fur Company. During this time, he assisted in defending against attacks from the Blackfeet and killing several tribesmen. The fur trade entered a decline in 1831 and Gray settled his family in Kawsmouth, Missouri sometime between 1831 and 1835. In 1841 he again moved to St. Mary, Montana.

John practiced some Mohawk traditions and married Anne Marie Teionaose who was also part Mohawk. However, John was also Catholic. He played the fiddle. He retired in Kansas City and was killed in a dispute with a neighbor in 1843.

Grey's River in Wyoming, Grey's Hole and Grays Lake in Idaho are named after him.
