= David Edward Jackson =

American pioneer, trapper, fur trader, and explorer (1788–1837)

- Born: c. 1788; Randolph County, Virginia, US
- Died: December 24, 1837 (aged 49); Paris, Tennessee, US
- Other name: Davey Jackson
- Occupations: Clerk; trapper; fur trader; explorer
- Employer: Rocky Mountain Fur Company
- Spouse: Juliet T. Norris
- Children: 4
- Relatives: Stonewall Jackson (nephew)

David Edward Jackson (c. 1788 – December 24, 1837) was an American pioneer, trapper, fur trader, and explorer.

Davey Jackson has often been referenced to as a son of the American Revolution. His father Edward Jackson and his Uncle George Jackson both served as Virginian Militia Officers during the Revolutionary War. During the War of 1812, Jackson was commissioned as an ensign in the 19th Infantry in Virginia.

The Jackson family included several notable military patriots. Genealogical records show that Colonel Thomas J. “Stonewall” Jackson, who famously led the Confederate victory at Harper’s Ferry, Maryland, in 1862, was the nephew of David Edward Jackson, founder of Jackson Hole. Despite their shared last name, however, they were not related to President Andrew Jackson, whose family came from South Carolina and had Scots-Irish roots.

Davey Jackson was born in Buckhannon, Virginia (present day West Virginia), on October 30, 1788, into a prominent family. In addition to learning the business, farming, hunting and surveying skills of his father, he was educated at the Virginia Randolph Academy. In 1809, at age 21, he married Juliet Norris and the couple had four children.

In 1822, Jackson saw an ad in a Missouri newspaper, seeking young men to travel the Missouri River to the Rocky Mountains, to be employed as guides, hunters, explorers and trappers with the Rocky Mountain Trading Company. Although his wife was against the idea, Jackson saw this as a great opportunity to explore and gain wealth. He joined the company, along with many other young men, such as Jim Bridger, William Sublette, and Jedediah Smith, while his wife and children remained in Virginia.

For eight years Jackson pursued this adventure, fraught with troubles, including harsh weather, difficult terrain, competition from Canadian, British and French trading companies, and both kindness and treachery from the Native tribes. The company suffered many losses as their beaver pelts were often stolen. Many trappers died under the harsh conditions of life in the Rocky Mountains, or by murder at the hands of competitors or native tribes.

Eventually Davey Jackson, William Sublette and Jedediah Smith formed their own fur trading company, “Smith, Jackson and Sublette.” Jackson often returned to the valley in the Teton Mountains where he had established his own trapping territory, which Sublette eventually dubbed “Jackson’s Hole.” (Today, the town of Jackson, Wyoming, in that valley, bears his name.)

He and his partners sold out in 1830, as the fur trade was declining. Jackson became involved in other expeditions, including to Santa Fe (in present-day New Mexico) and California, both under Mexican control since it had achieved independence from Spain in 1821.

Jackson returned east, without amassing his fortune. He reunited with his son William Pitt Jackson in St. Genevieve, Missouri, in the early 1830’s.

On a business trip to Paris, Tennessee in 1837, Jackson became ill with Typhus Fever. By December 1837, although gravely ill, he managed to write a letter to his oldest son Edward John Jackson, known as “Ned,” asking him to conclude all his business dealings. He provided his son a thorough written account of all the money that was owed to him, and all the debts he had yet to pay.

Jackson died shortly after that at age 49, on December 24, 1837, in Paris, Tennessee. He was a long time member of the Masons. Upon his death Jackson was buried by fellow Masons from Paris, Tennessee, in the Paris City Cemetery, Henry County, Tennessee.

== Early life ==
=== Paternal ancestry ===
David Edward Jackson was the grandson of John Jackson (1715 or 1719 – 1801) and Elizabeth Cummins (also known as Elizabeth Comings and Elizabeth Needles) (1723–1828). John Jackson was a Protestant (Ulster-Scottish) from Coleraine, County Londonderry, Ireland. While living in London, England, he was convicted of the capital crime of larceny for stealing £170; the judge at the Old Bailey sentenced him to seven years of indentured servitude in the British colonies of North America. Elizabeth, a strong, blonde woman over 6 feet (180 cm) tall, born in London, was also convicted of larceny in an unrelated case for stealing 19 pieces of silver, jewelry, and fine lace, and received a similar sentence. They both were transported on the prison ship Litchfield, which departed London in May 1749 with 150 convicts. John and Elizabeth met on board and had declared their love in the weeks before the ship arrived at Annapolis, Maryland. Although they were sent to different locations in Maryland for their indentures, the couple married in July 1755.

The family migrated west across the Blue Ridge Mountains to settle near Moorefield, Virginia (now West Virginia) in 1758. In 1770, they moved farther west to the Tygart Valley. They began to acquire large parcels of virgin farming land near the present-day town of Buckhannon, including 3,000 acres (12 km²) in Elizabeth's name. John and his two teenage sons were early recruits for the American Revolutionary War, fighting in the Battle of Kings Mountain on October 7, 1780. John finished the war as captain and served as a lieutenant of the Virginia militia after 1787. While the men were in the Army, Elizabeth converted their home to a haven, "Jackson's Fort," for refugees from Indian attacks.

John and Elizabeth had eight children. Their second son was Edward Jackson (March 1, 1759 – December 25, 1828); Edward and his wife had three boys and three girls; the second boy being David. Their third son was Jonathan Jackson, father of Thomas, known as Stonewall Jackson when he served as a general in the Civil War.

=== Childhood ===
David Edward Jackson, son of Col. Edward Jackson, was born in Randolph County in the Allegheny Mountains of what was then part of Virginia and is now in West Virginia. When he was eight, his mother died. His father remarried three years later. In 1801, when he was 13, his family moved west, settling near Weston, West Virginia Lewis County, on the Allegheny Plateau. Jackson's father and stepmother had nine more children.

== Ashley and Henry ==
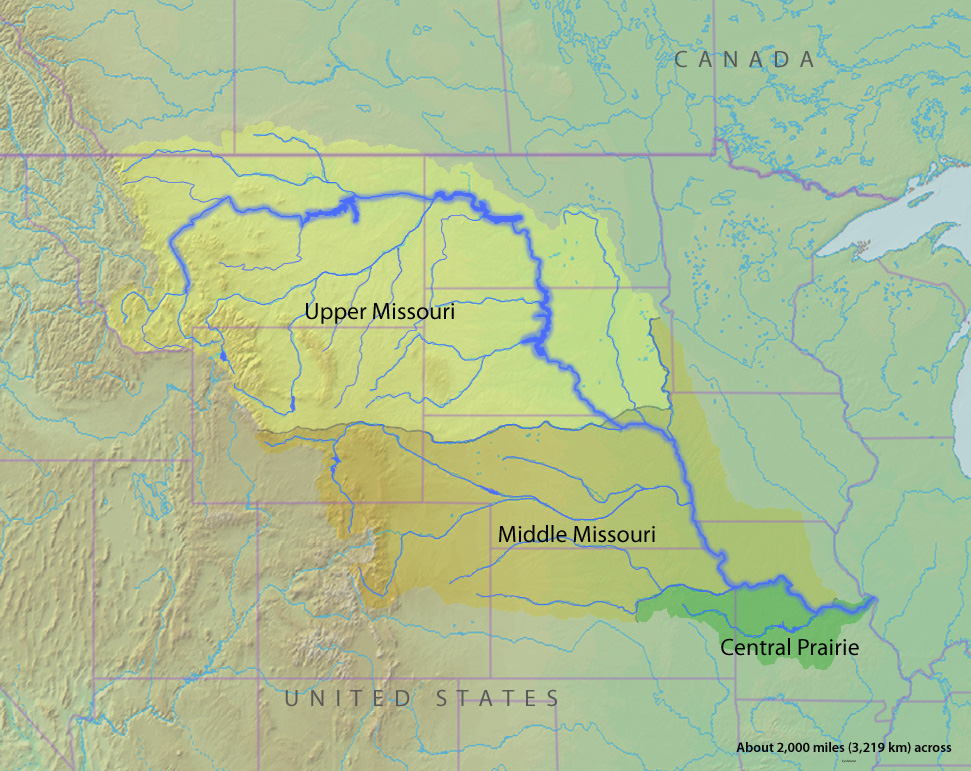
Regions of the Missouri River Watershed

Jackson married and moved to Ste. Genevieve, Missouri, with his wife and four children in the early 1820s, planning to engage in farming. The town had been founded by French colonists in the late 18th century. His older brother, George, had preceded him to the area and owned a sawmill.

Instead of farming, Jackson responded to William Ashley's advertisement looking to employ men for his and Andrew Henry's new fur trade venture. Jackson was probably hired as a clerk. In the spring of 1822, Jackson headed up the Missouri River with Henry and 150 other men in a fur trade expedition to Native American tribes on the upper river. (Note: A letter addressed to Joshua Pilcher stated that Henry left St. Louis with "one boat and one hundred & fifty men by land and water.") A few weeks later, Ashley sent more men, including Jedediah Smith on a boat called the Enterprize. It sank and left the men stranded in the wilderness for several weeks.

Ashley himself brought up an additional 46 men on a replacement boat, and they and the stranded group finally reached Fort Henry. It had been built over the summer by the first group of 150 men. (Note: Although Ashley advertised for 100 men, he hired more than 200. The "100 men" were trappers, and were called "Ashley's Hundred")

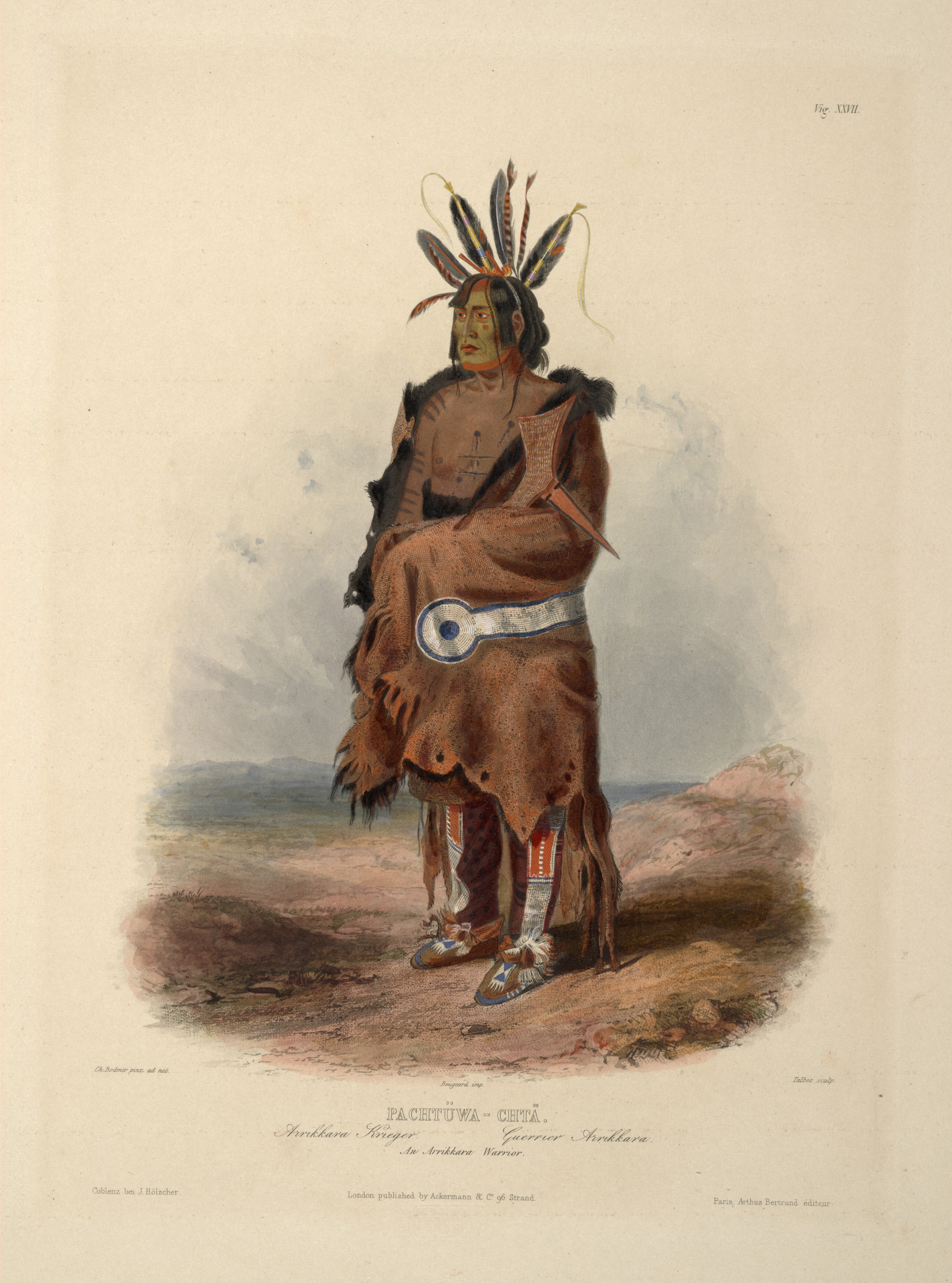
Arikara warrior Bodmer (1840–1843)

It is not known if Jackson returned to St. Louis with Ashley that fall, or traveled with Jedediah Smith in the spring of 1823. At that time, Major Henry ordered Smith and some other men to go down the Missouri to Grand River in order to meet Ashley and buy horses from the Arikara, but warning him of the Native Americans' hostility to whites. They had recently had a skirmish with men from the Missouri Fur Company. Ashley, who was bringing supplies as well as 70 new men up the river by boat, met Smith at the Arikara village on May 30. They negotiated a trade for several horses and 200 buffalo robes. They planned to leave as soon as possible to avert trouble, but weather delayed them. An incident precipitated an Arikara attack on the Ashley party. Forty Ashley men were caught in a vulnerable position, and 12 were killed. (Note: Another man had died in the initial incident, and one more died later of his injuries, making 14 the total death toll of the whites.)

Ashley and the rest of the surviving party traveled by boat downriver, ultimately enlisting aid from Colonel Henry Leavenworth, commander of Fort Atkinson. In August, Leavenworth sent a force of 250 military men, 80 Ashley-Henry men, 60 men of the Missouri Fur Company, and a number of Lakota Sioux warriors, enemies of the Arikara. They intended to subdue and punish the Arikara. After a botched campaign, Leavenworth negotiated a peace treaty.

Either David Jackson or his brother George had been appointed commander of one of the two squads of the Ashley-Henry men in this military expedition. (Note: Carl D. W. Hays, 1917-1979, Jackson's great grandson said that George Jackson was well acquainted with Ashley, and speculated that the Ashley accidentally recorded George's name instead of David Jackson's in his account of the incident.)

== Smith, Jackson & Sublette ==
Little is known about Jackson's movements until just after the 1826 Rocky Mountain Rendezvous, a major gathering of trappers and traders. It is presumed he was at the first, 1825 rendezvous held on Henrys Fork of the Green River, (Note: Henry's Fork is believed to be named for Andrew Henry) but he may not have been at the one held in 1826 at Bear River in Cache Valley. Soon after the rendezvous, Ashley, along with his party taking back the furs, traveled with Smith and William Sublette to near present-day Georgetown, Idaho. There, Jackson and the other men bought out Ashley's share of the Ashley-Smith partnership. (Note: Henry retired from the fur trade after 1824, and Ashley had taken on Smith as a partner at the 1825 rendezvous.)

As a partner, Jackson took on the role of field manager, possibly because of his similar role when working for Ashley. That fall, Jackson, Sublette, and Robert Campbell trapped along the Snake River (Note: Then called it the Lewis River) system, then moved up into the upper Missouri and over the Great Divide to the headwaters of the Columbia River. (Note: There were too many companies taking pelts, and too little time for breeding pairs to replace the animals trapped. In part, the nature of beavers was at fault; the animals instinctively migrate to new undammed, heavily forested stream beds, and avoid old dams. The effect of trapping a breeding pair was to cause an interruption in beaver population that took years to recoup until the region regenerated its tree stocks and new migrant beavers re-established numbers in the locale. Jackson is said to have spent the early winter of 1826-27 "clearing off any beaver which remained" on various streams in Idaho, thus endangering the future there. (In the 20th century, Idaho continued to relocate beaver to rebuild populations in areas where they had been decimated. WWII parachutes were used to drop beaver into inaccessible areas))

Jackson and his party traveled south to Cache Valley, where they spent the rest of the 1826-1827 winter. He was at the 1827 rendezvous at Bear Lake, then returned to St. Louis, Missouri, which had become a center of fur trade, with Sublette for a short time.

Jackson returned to the fur country for the 1828 rendezvous, after which he traveled with a party to the Flathead Lake, Montana region, where they wintered. The next spring, Smith found him along the Flathead River. The two partners and their men trapped down to Pierre's Hole, where they joined Sublette. The rendezvous that year (1829), was held near present-day Lander, Wyoming. Jackson is thought to have returned afterward to the upper Snake River region in northwest Wyoming, then traveled east to spend the winter with Smith and Sublette along the Wind and Powder rivers. Jackson returned to the upper Snake in the spring of 1830, then returned to the Wind River Valley for the annual rendezvous.

At the rendezvous, Smith, Jackson and Sublette sold out their interests in the fur trade to a group of men who called the firm the Rocky Mountain Fur Company. The three partners returned to St. Louis, having made a tidy profit in their enterprise.

=== Trip to Santa Fe ===
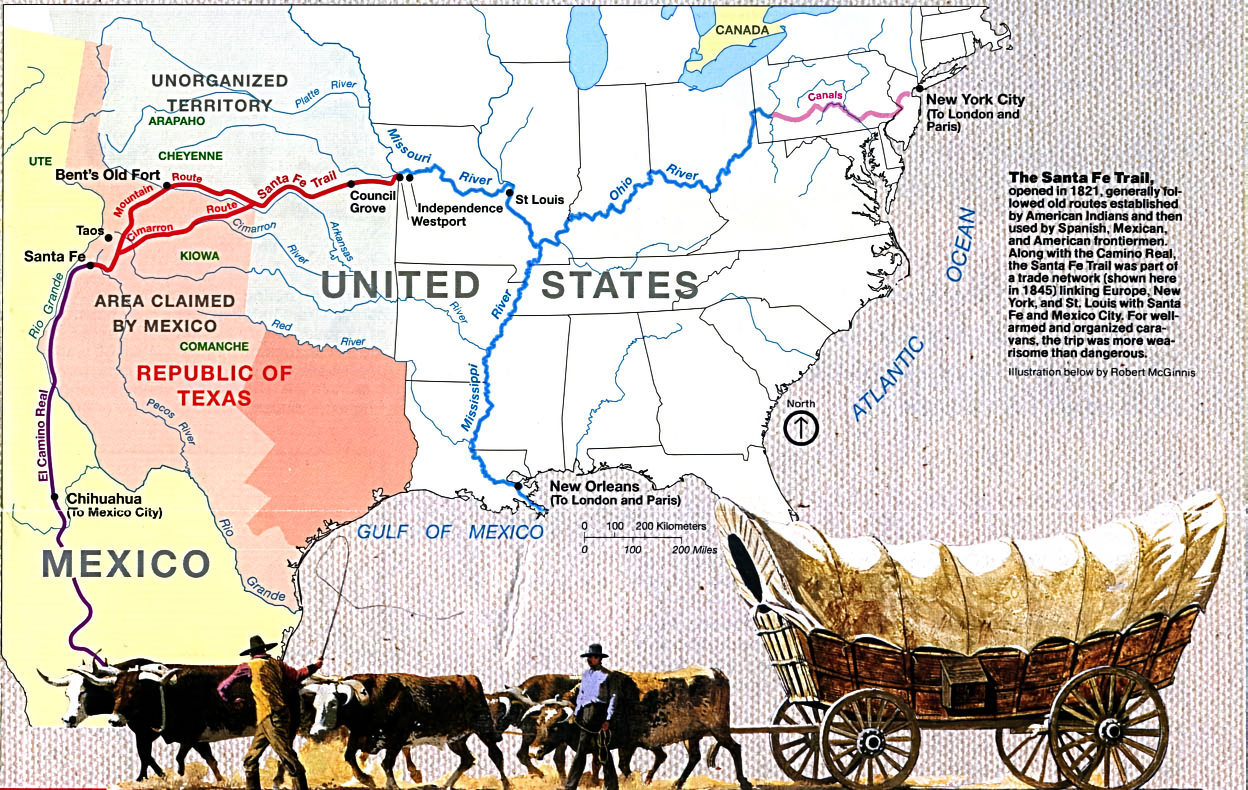

By early 1831, Jackson was in southeast Missouri's lead belt, attending to his personal affairs and those of his brother George, who died on March 26, 1831. On April 7, he returned to St. Louis to meet with his partners for a trade trip to Santa Fe, which was controlled by the Spanish. The caravan of wagons left St. Louis on April 10, 1831, traveling down the Santa Fe Trail. To save time, the group decided to take the "Cimarron cutoff," at the risk of not finding water for two days. Smith went missing while looking for water, but the caravan continued on, hoping he would find them.

Upon reaching Santa Fe on July 4, 1831, the members of the trading party discovered a Mexican merchant at the Santa Fe market offering several of Smith's personal belongings for sale. When questioned about the items, the merchant indicated that he had acquired them from a band of Comanche hunters. Smith had encountered and been killed by a group of Comanche. His death resulted in Jackson and Sublette reorganizing their partnership.

== California ==
While in Santa Fe, Jackson partnered with David Waldo, to journey to California to sell the merchandise he had transported from Missouri. Waldo convinced him of the viability of traveling to California to purchase mules, and to drive them back to Missouri to sell, to yield more profit. Jackson and Sublette traveled to Taos where Jackson met Ewing Young, who had traveled between Santa Fe and California the previous year. He persuaded Jackson that his knowledge of the area would be indispensable to Jackson and Waldo in the mule venture. It was decided Jackson would take a group of men directly to California, and travel through the area buying mules. Young and his group of men would trap along the way to California, and meet up with Jackson in time to drive the mules back to Santa Fe. Jackson left for Santa Fe on August 25, 1831.

On September 6, Jackson's group left Santa Fe. (Note: Sublette, Austin Smith, and other members of the caravan returned to St. Louis) Members of the group included, Jackson and his slave, Jim; Jedediah Smith's younger brother Peter, (Note: Both Peter and another brother, Austin had accompanied the trade trip to Santa Fe.) Jonathan Trumbull Warner, Samuel Parkman, and possibly David's brother William Waldo; Moses Carson, brother of Kit; and four other men. Several weeks later, they reached Tucson, Arizona, and went on to the Gila River, which they followed to the Colorado River. They crossed the Colorado River and the Colorado Desert, reaching San Diego in early November.

Jackson traveled up the California coast as far north as the lower end of the San Francisco Bay. By the end of March, 1832, when he met with Young in Los Angeles, he had purchased only 600 mules and 100 horses rather than the more than 1,000 they had planned. In May, the two groups drove the animals to the Colorado River, reaching it at its floodstage in June. After 12 days, they had the animals swim across. Jackson's and Young's parties again split; Young to take $10,000 of Jackson/Waldo cash and property and return to California (Note: Pauline Weaver may have been with Young's party up to that point but transferred to Jackson's for the trip back.) and continue trapping and buying mules to drive back later. Jackson took possession of the skins which Young had trapped to that point.

Due to the summer heat, many of the mules died on the way back to Santa Fe, which the party reached in the first week of July. Jackson sold part of the herd of animals in Santa Fe. Ira Smith, another Jedediah Smith brother, had traveled to Santa Fe to meet Peter. Ira and Jackson headed back to St. Louis with the remaining animals.

== Later years and death ==
Upon his return to Missouri, the 44-year-old Jackson began to have health problems. He spent his remaining years trying to put his financial affairs in order. He had never heard from Ewing Young, after leaving him with the substantial amount of cash and property at the Colorado River, but was never healthy enough to return to California to try to collect payment. In January 1837, he finally was able to travel to Paris, Tennessee, to try to collect money on some investments he had made there. While there, Jackson contracted typhoid fever. He lingered for several months and died on December 24, 1837.

== Young's later years ==
Ewing Young left California for Oregon in 1834. With the money and property secured from Jackson, he had capital for several ventures. In February 1841, Young died without any known heir and without a will. Probate court had to deal with his estate, which had many debtors and creditors among the settlers. Doctor Ira L. Babcock was selected as supreme judge with probate powers to deal with Young's estate. The activities that followed Young's death contributed to the creation of a provisional government in the Oregon Country.

== Jackson's legacy ==
- Jackson Lake, and Jackson Hole, a valley in Wyoming are named for David Jackson. The town of Jackson, Wyoming, in turn, derives its name from the valley.
- The Hoback Basin, a braided floodplain of the Hoback River where Bondurant, Wyoming is located, was once known as Jackson's Little Hole.
