= Milton Sublette =

- Born: c. 1801; Somerset, Kentucky
- Died: 1837 (age 36); Fort William (Wyoming) Fort William, Oregon Country, present day Fort Laramie Wyoming]]
- Other names: Milton Sublett, Milton Green Sublett
- Occupations: frontiersman, trapper, fur trader, explorer
- Known for: Being a co-owner of the Rocky Mountain Fur Company, with Andrew Henry
- Relatives: William Sublette (brother), Andrew Sublette (brother), Pinkney Sublette (brother), Solomon Sublette (brother)

Milton Green Sublette (c. 1801–1837), was an American frontiersman, trapper, fur trader, explorer, and mountain man. He was the second of five Sublette brothers prominent in the western fur trade; William, Andrew, and Solomon. Milton was one of five men who formed the Rocky Mountain Fur Company to buy out the investment of his brother William L. Sublette, Jedediah S. Smith and Dave E. Jackson.

Sublette injured his leg in an 1826 battle with Native Americans in what was then considered Mexico by Euro-Americans; it was slow to heal and repeatedly became seriously infected. After it was removed by a surgeon named Farrar in St. Louis in 1835 (most likely Bernard Gaines Farrar), he walked on a "cork leg" procured by Robert Campbell through his brother Hugh Campbell. Later, he rode in a Dearborn wagon, drawn by one mule, as he left the St. Louis area heading for the west. Later infections in the leg led to his early death at Fort John, on the Laramie River, now in Wyoming. In 1843, Solomon Sublette, while traveling with William D. Stewart and William L. Sublette's caravan, took a grave marker to Fort John and placed it on Milton's grave. Today, Milton's actual grave site is lost to us, due to the US Military placing a building over the site of Fort William's grave yard.

Sublette was reported to be a man of dynamic and attractive personality, with a strong tendency toward impetuous action and speech. He was called "the Thunderbolt of the Rockies."

== See also ==
- Pierre's Hole

== Sources ==
- Nunis, Doyce B. Jr., Milton G. Sublette, featured in Trappers of the Far West, Leroy R. Hafen, editor. 1972, Arthur H. Clark Company, reprint University of Nebraska Press, October 1983. ISBN 0-8032-7218-9
- Utley, Robert M., A Life Wild and Perilous: Mountain Men and the Paths to the Pacific, 1997, Henry Holt and Company.
