= William Sublette =

American trapper, fur trader, and explorer

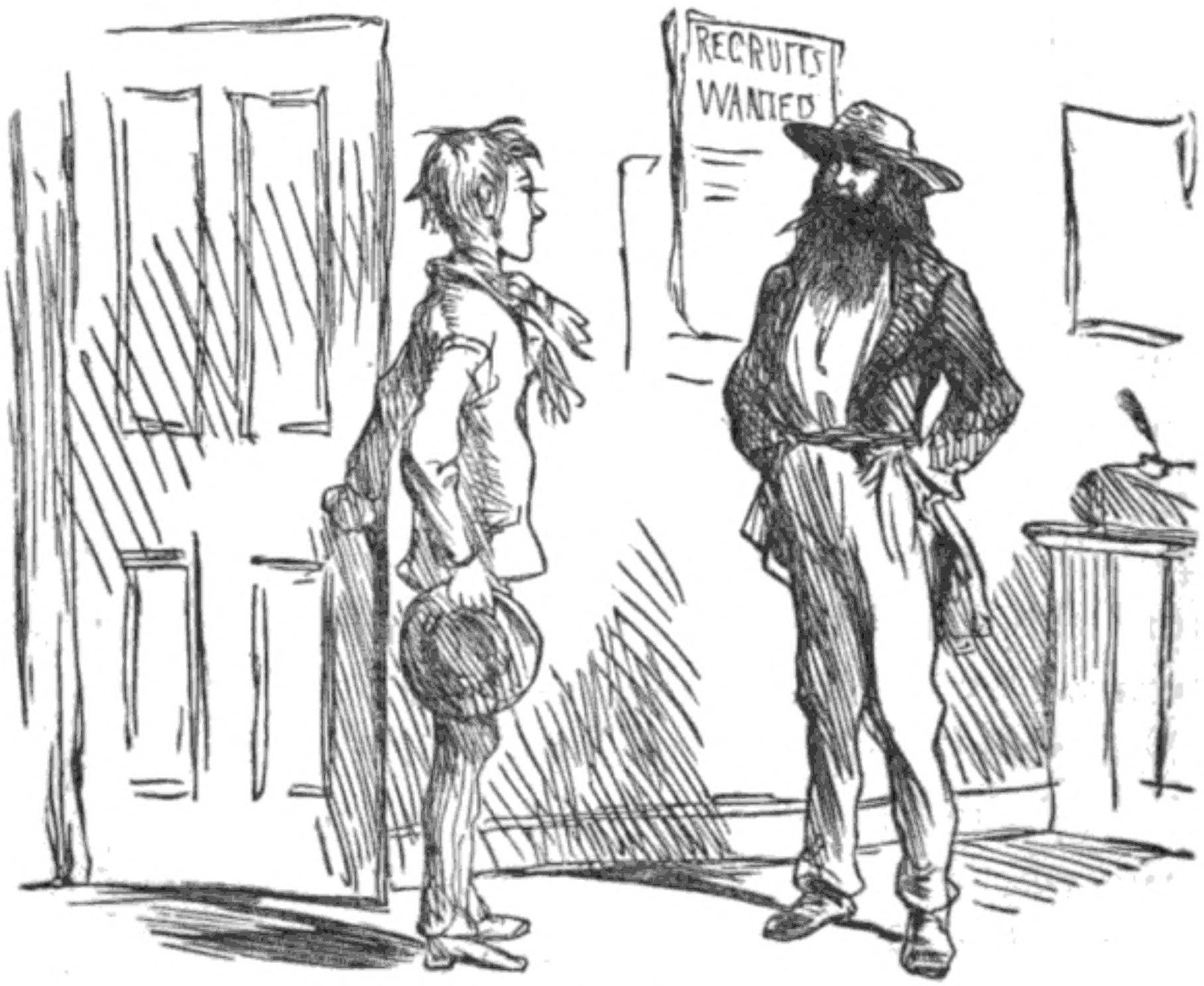
- Drawing depicts Sublette interviewing the young Joseph Meek. Image from Eleven Years in the Rocky Mountains... by Frances Fuller Victor.
- Born: William Lewis Sublette; September 21, 1798; Stanford, Lincoln County, Kentucky, United States
- Died: July 23, 1845 (aged 46); St. Louis, Missouri, United States
- Resting place: Bellefontaine Cemetery, St. Louis, Missouri
- Other names: William Sublett, Bill Sublette, Cutface
- Occupations: Frontiersman, trapper, fur trader, explorer
- Employer: Rocky Mountain Fur Company
- Known for: Being a co-owner of the Rocky Mountain Fur Company, with Andrew Henry, after buying out the company shares, of William Henry Ashley
- Relatives: Milton Sublette (brother), Andrew Sublette (brother), Pinkney Sublette (brother), Solomon Sublette (brother) Laurel Seberg (grandchild)

William Lewis Sublette (September 21, 1798 – July 23, 1845), also spelled Sublett, was an American frontiersman, trapper, fur trader, explorer, and mountain man. After 1823, he became an agent of the Rocky Mountain Fur Company, along with his four brothers. Later he became one of the company's co-owners, utilizing the riches of the Oregon Country. He helped settle and improve the best routes for migrants along the Oregon Trail.

== Early life ==
The Sublette family descended from the Soblet family, a French Huguenot family who emigrated from France (Ardennes region) to America, initially in Virginia, in the early 1700. William Sublette was born on September 21, 1798, near Stanford, Lincoln County, Kentucky, from Philip Allen and Isabella Sublette. He was one of five Sublette brothers, who all became prominent in the western fur trade: William, Milton, Andrew, Pinkney, and Solomon. They had ties to traders in St. Louis, which had built its early wealth in the fur trade. St. Louis had several families with prominent connections, ranging from tribes on the Upper Missouri River and into the Rocky Mountains, to Spanish towns in the Southwest along the Santa Fe Trail.

== Fur trading ==
Sublette was among the mountain men who journeyed into the Rocky Mountains and other unorganized territories, which were often economically controlled by the joint British-Canadian fur companies of Hudson's Bay Company and North West Company. Both companies competed against the activities of the American Fur Company, founded by John Jacob Astor, who created a monopoly in the American West before 1830.

In 1823, William was recruited in St. Louis by William Henry Ashley as part of a fur trapping contingent, later referred to as Ashley's Hundred. That was the beginning of a new strategy for conducting the fur trade in response to a change in United States law in 1822. Liquor had been one of the principal currencies traded to Native Americans; such trafficking had been made illegal. The new scheme set up a trapper's rendezvous, a teamster-drover team operating the freight bringing in supplies and returning with furs, and a corps of trappers making their circuit through the year to traps they had set as team members.

By 1826, Sublette acquired Ashley's fur business, along with Jedediah Smith and David Edward Jackson. By the mid-1830s, his brother Milton joined as one of five men who bought the Rocky Mountain Fur Company from William and his partners. Sublette retired from trapping after being wounded at the Rendezvous of 1832 in the Battle of Pierre's Hole. Some accounts said that he had caused the conflict. After recuperating for over a year back in St. Louis, Sublette returned to the uplands and founded Fort William, in the foothills east of the South Pass. The fort commanded the last eastern stream crossing at the foot of the last ascent to the floor of South Pass. That was the only route readily navigable by wagons over the Continental Divide.

Scottish adventurer William Drummond Stewart co-hosted a party similar to a rendezvous near Pinedale, Wyoming with Sublette in the late summer of 1843.

He sold Fort William to the American Fur Company, which renamed it Fort John. After the U.S. Army took it over, it was renamed as Fort Laramie. Sublette retired to St. Louis, where he died in 1845. He was buried at Bellefontaine Cemetery in northern St. Louis.

== Legacy ==
The following places were named after Sublette:

- Sublette County, Wyoming
- Sublette Street in Pocatello, Idaho
- Sublette, Kansas
- The Sublett Range in southeast Idaho
- Sublette Park and Sublette Avenue in St. Louis
- A Liberty ship was launched and christened William L. Sublette in 1943.
