= Rocky Mountain Rendezvous =

American fur trading meeting (1825–1840)

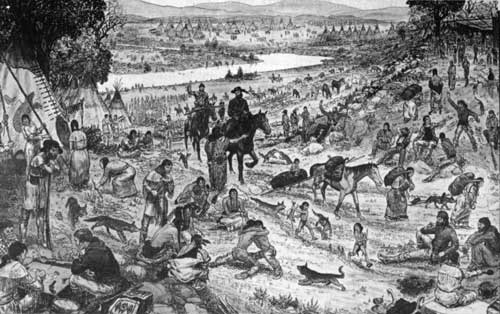
- Typical rendezvous scene
- Status: No longer held
- Begins: Early summer
- Ends: Mid-summer
- Frequency: Annual
- Location: Various
- Years active: 1825 – 1840
- Founder: William Henry Ashley
- Participants: Fur trappers & merchants

The Rocky Mountain Rendezvous was an annual rendezvous, held between 1825 and 1840 at various locations, organized by a fur trading company at which trappers and mountain men sold their furs and hides and replenished their supplies. The fur companies assembled teamster-driven mule trains which carried whiskey and supplies to a pre-announced location each spring-summer and set up a trading fair (the rendezvous). At the end of the rendezvous, the teamsters packed the furs out, either to Fort Vancouver in the Pacific Northwest for the British companies or to one of the northern Missouri River ports such as St. Joseph, Missouri, for American companies. Early explorer and trader Jacques La Ramee organized a group of independent free trappers to the first ever gathering as early as 1815 at the junction of the North Platte and Laramie Rivers after befriending numerous native American tribes.

Rendezvous were known to be lively, joyous places, where all were allowed—fur trappers, Indians, native trapper wives and children, harlots, travelers and later tourists—who would venture from as far as Europe to observe the festivities. James Beckwourth describes: "Mirth, songs, dancing, shouting, trading, running, jumping, singing, racing, target-shooting, yarns, frolic, with all sorts of extravagances that white men or Indians could invent."

Rendezvous are still celebrated as gatherings of like-minded individuals. The fur trading rendezvous are celebrated by traditional black-powder rifle clubs in the U.S. and Canada. These events range from small gatherings sponsored by local clubs to large gatherings like the Pacific Primitive Rendezvous, the Rocky Mountain National Rendezvous, and others. They include many activities similar to the originals, centering on shooting muzzle-loading rifles, trade guns, and shotguns; throwing knives and tomahawks; primitive archery; as well as cooking, dancing, singing, and the telling of tall tales and of past rendezvous. Personas taken on by participants include trappers, traders, housewives, Native Americans, frontiersmen, free-trappers and others, including soldiers.

Although the original style of rendezvous was now unnecessary and no longer occur, in their memory various Wyoming towns and cities (especially ones where rendezvous previously occurred) will put on local festivals resembling town fairs. There may also be another section of this festival dedicated to more traditional item buying, selling and activities. Some of the things sold here may include arrowheads, fans, various animal hides, walking sticks, carvings, knives, whistles, and handcrafted jewelry.

== Locations ==
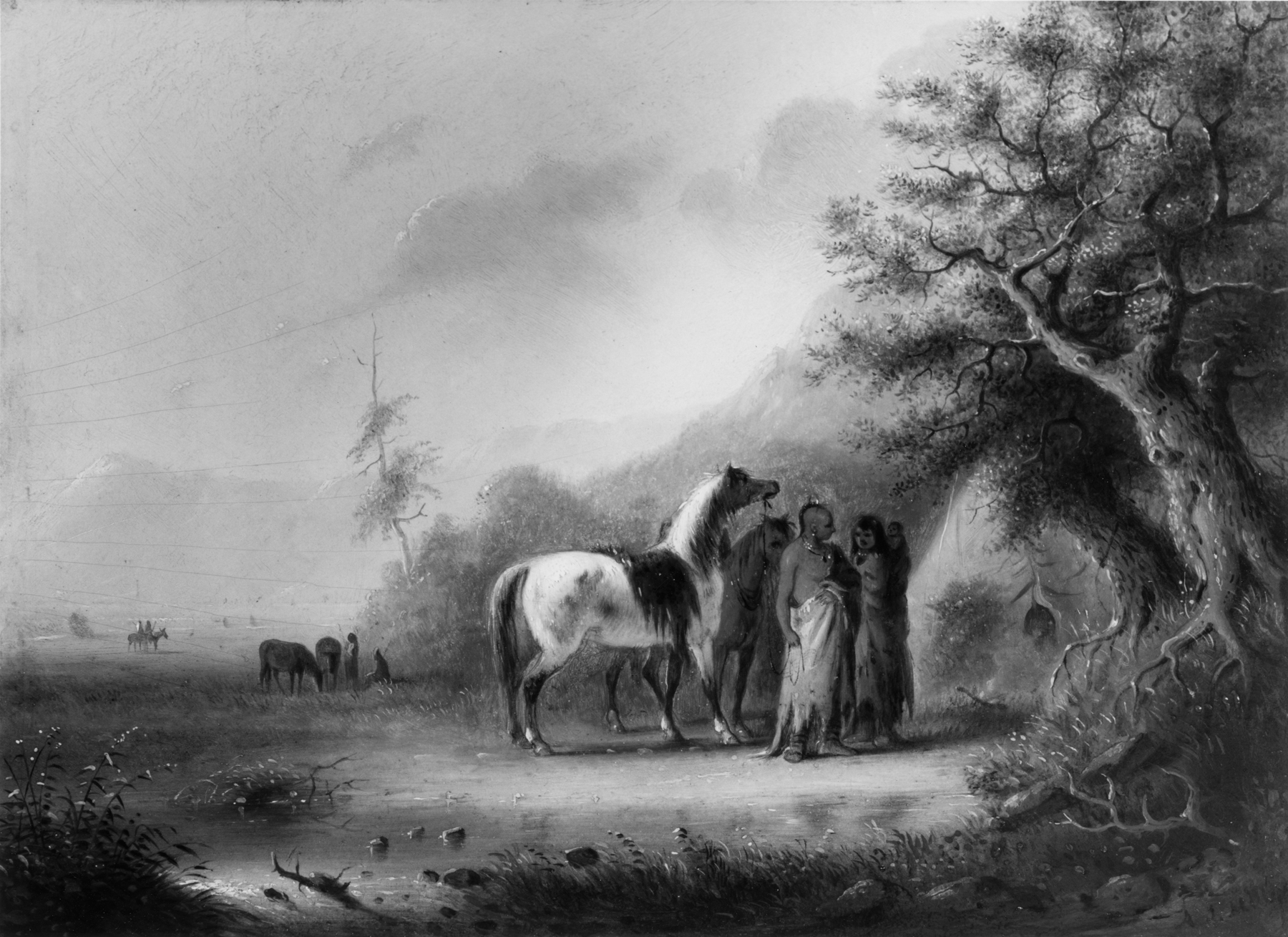
Alfred Jacob Miller - Sioux Indians in the Mountains - Miller en route to a Rocky Mountain Rendezvous In the spring of 1837, Captain William Drummond Stewart hired the Baltimorean Alfred Jacob Miller to accompany and record an expedition to the annual fur traders' rendezvous held in the foothills of the Rocky Mountains in what is now Wyoming.

- 1815: LaRamée's rendezvous; in present-day Wyoming at the junction of the Laramie and North Platte rivers.
- 1825: McKinnon, Wyoming the first rendezvous of white traders and trappers in the Rocky Mountains occurred in July 1825 just north of McKinnon along Henrys Fork. They joined members of William Henry Ashley's expedition. At this rendezvous, Jedediah Smith became Ashley's partner in the fur trade.
- 1826: Cache Valley, Utah, either at today's Cove or at the more southern Hyrum. After the rendezvous, Ashley and Smith continued up to the Bear River where they met up with David Jackson and William Sublette. Smith, Jackson, and Sublette bought out Ashley's share of the fur company.
- 1827: Bear Lake, near today's Laketown, Utah. Conflicts and fights with Blackfoot Indians occurred during the meeting.
- 1828: Bear Lake; more fights with the Blackfoot occurred.
- 1829: Lander, Wyoming
- 1830: Riverton; Wyoming. Smith, Jackson, and Sublette sold their company to Jim Bridger, Thomas Fitzpatrick, Milton Sublette (the brother of William), Henry Freab, and Baptiste Gervais.
- 1831: Cache Valley; the support trek was late, so there was no real rendezvous.
- 1832: Pierre's Hole, east of Rexburg, Idaho
- 1833: Upper Green River Rendezvous Site, Daniel, Wyoming
- 1834: Granger, Wyoming; the Rocky Mountain Fur Company was dissolved, and the American Fur Company took over supplying the rendezvous.
- 1835: Daniel, Wyoming
- 1836: Daniel, Wyoming
- 1837: Daniel, Wyoming
- 1838: Riverton, Wyoming
- 1839: Daniel, Wyoming
- 1840: Daniel, Wyoming

== See also ==
- Red River Jig
- Fur trade in Montana
