= Fort Henry (North Dakota) =

19th century fort on the Missouri River in the USA

Coordinates: 47°56′36.2″N 104°00′45.7″W

Fort Henry on the Missouri River, located at the mouth of the Yellowstone where it enters the Missouri, was established on October 1, 1822, by a party of men led by Major Andrew Henry, who mounted the expedition for the purpose of establishing a fur trade outpost for an area which now encompasses most of Montana, western North Dakota, parts of Wyoming, into Canada. The site of the fort, which was abandoned in 1823, is approximately 20 miles (32 km) southwest of Williston, North Dakota near the Montana - North Dakota state line.

Other short-lived forts were established by Henry on his earlier expedition with the Missouri Fur Company. In the spring of 1810, the first Fort Henry was built at the Three Forks of the Missouri River near-present day Three Forks, Montana, but was abandoned shortly thereafter. A second Fort Henry was established during the fall of 1810 on Henry's Fork of the Snake River in present-day southeastern Idaho; it was abandoned in 1811.
