= Rocky Mountain Fur Company =

American company in St. Louis (1822–1834)

- Type: Private
- Industry: Fur trade
- Founded: 1822; 204 years ago, in St. Louis, Missouri, U.S.
- Founder: William Henry Ashley, Andrew Henry
- Defunct: 1834
- Fate: Dissolved
- Headquarters: St. Louis, Missouri
- Area served: United States and Territories

Rocky Mountain Fur Company was established in St. Louis, Missouri, in 1822 by William Henry Ashley and Andrew Henry. Among the original employees, known as "Ashley's Hundred," were Jedediah Smith, who went on to take a leading role in the company's operations, and Jim Bridger, who was among those who bought out Smith and his partners in 1830. It was Bridger and his partners who gave the enterprise the name "Rocky Mountain Fur Company."

The company became a pioneer in western exploration, most notably in the Green River Valley. The operations of other aspiring organizations like the American Fur Company would often overlap, causing a fierce rivalry. Growing competition motivated the trappers to explore and head deeper into the wilderness. This led to greater knowledge of the topography and to great reductions in the beaver populations.

Eventually the intense competition for fewer and fewer beavers and the transient style of fur hats brought the Rocky Mountain Fur Company down. Nearly a decade after its founding, the stock holders sold all their shares, leaving behind a legacy in terms of both western settlement and folklore. The US government, seeking geographic knowledge or travel advice regarding the West, would seek out former members of the company as consultants. Ashley himself later became a congressman whose expertise was western affairs.

== Founding ==
In the early 1820s General William Ashley, of the Missouri militia, was looking to enter state politics but needed to raise funds to do so. Having barely survived a slew of past entrepreneurial and military pursuits, Ashley was looking at an insolvent future. To counteract his previous financial failures, he looked west to the fur trade. Joining him as a partner in the firm of Ashley Henry was Major Andrew Henry, a long-time friend of Ashley's.

Canvassing the local St. Louis area in 1822, Ashley Henry published an ad in the St. Louis Enquirer. It targeted "One Hundred enterprising young men . . . to ascend the river Missouri to its source, there to be employed for one, two, or three years." The caliber of men sought by Ashley and Henry would serve as the prototypical "mountain man". The criteria for the position was simple enough – masculine, well-armed, and able to work (trap) for up to three years.

The ad attracted ample attention; roughly 180 men signed up. Among those hired were Jedediah Smith and Jim Bridger. Later, the Sublette brothers, William and Milton, Jim Beckwourth, Hugh Glass, Thomas Fitzpatrick, David Edward Jackson, Joseph Meek, Robert Newell joined the company. Smith, Jackson and William Sublette bought the firm in 1826, changing its name to Smith, Jackson and William Sublette. They sold out to Bridger, Milton Sublette, Fitzpatrick and two others in 1830, at which time the enterprise was given the name by which it is most commonly referred to.

The payment method was uniquely designed by Ashley. Leveraging employment costs, Ashley and Henry had their trappers keep half of their proceeds and forfeit the other half to management. In turn, Ashley and Henry would provide many of the materials needed to trap.

== Operation ==
In the early days, Ashley's Hundred worked the lands around the upper Missouri River. As the company considered building outposts along the river, Ashley soon discovered that the Missouri Fur Company had already done so. Eventually Ashley and his company moved farther west to the mountain range for which it was named.

Forging new paths and discovering landscapes unknown to whites, the Rocky Mountain Fur Company pioneered a new style in the fur trade, albeit it was ultimately an adaption of the methods of the Northwest Company and Hudson's Bay Company to the central Rockies. Known as the brigade-rendezvous system, Major Henry's system was formed in part as a reaction to a July 1822 law prohibiting the sale of alcohol to Native Americans. Prior to this point, the fur trade had relied on First Nations to do the actual trapping and hunting that produced the furs; they were then brought to trading posts where, with increasing frequency, the Native Americans were given liquor both as an actual medium of exchange, and in order to render them pliant and easily cheated. The pattern was so firmly established that it was difficult to conduct business without a substantial supply of alcohol. Henry's plan made Native American trappers and trading posts unnecessary; he trained Euro-Americans and Métis to trap and then meet up at a rendezvous, a temporary trade gathering located wherever was convenient.

Ashley and his men had mixed success. By the middle of the decade, the company had a firm grasp of the Rockies. Headquartered in the Green River Valley, trappers found numerous spots to collect valuable pelts. Some of these locations included: Horse Creek, La Barge Creek, Fontenolle Creek, and Black Fork. Two popular trading destinations were Pierre's Hole in Idaho and Fort Bonneville (also called Fort Nonsense) in Wyoming. In some cases, however, the company took heavy losses. Losing supplies and even men, some expeditions ended in catastrophe. On two occasions, trappers were killed by Blackfeet and Arikara First Nations. Another blow was when Major Andrew Henry, considered the most experienced trapper, left the company in 1824. Two years later Ashley followed suit to embark on a political career. In 1826 he sold his company off to a group of his employees. Nonetheless, the Rocky Mountain Fur Company continued for eight more years. None of these setbacks spelled the end for Ashley's Hundred, but soon the company confronted the same set of problems that faced the entire industry.

== Decline and demise ==
Like all fur companies at the time, Ashley's Hundred went out of business in face of deepening financial woes. Competition, which bred bitter rivalries, helped to price the Rocky Mountain Fur Company out of the market. Declining beaver populations and shifting fashions did the rest of the damage.

Rocky Mountain trappers encroached on competitors' territory, resulting in bitter turf wars. The Rocky Mountain Fur Company was a rival to Hudson's Bay Company and John Jacob Astor's American Fur Company. They frequently held their rendezvous near a Hudson's Bay Company post to draw off some of their First Nation trade, and their trappers went into the Snake, Umpqua and Rogue River valleys, all of which were considered the domain of the Hudson's Bay Company. By 1832, the competition was at its height. So too was the growing Native American resentment, which resulted in several skirmishes. Moreover, unbridled competition dwindled the available fur supply. A once healthy population of beaver, otter, bear, and muskrat disappeared; the companies found it harder and harder to trap. This only led to greater struggle for the zones with abundant game. The larger American and Hudson's Bay companies also had an advantage over the Rocky Mountain Fur Company. With access to a wider land base, these two companies undersold their smaller competitor. Even more catastrophic was the fading popularity of the fur hat. Once a staple of European and American fashion, fur hats fell out of fashion in the 1830s, replaced by newly popular silk hats. By 1834, the company was in trouble. Facing insolvency, the partners decided to sell off their assets. A once bitter rival, the American Fur Company, quickly absorbed Ashley's creation.

== See also ==
- Fur trade in Montana
- Joseph LaBarge – Fur trader and steamboat captain on the Missouri River
- The Revenant (2015 film) - Film based on Hugh Glass's story
- Rocky Mountain Rendezvous
