= Andrew Henry (fur trader) =

American fur trader (c. 1775–1832)

- Born: c. 1775; Fayette County, Province of Pennsylvania
- Died: January 10, 1832 (aged c. 56); Washington County, Missouri, U.S.
- Occupations: Miner, bullet maker, manufacturer, army officer, frontiersman, trapper, fur trader, entrepreneur, hunter, explorer
- Known for: Being the co-owner of the successful Rocky Mountain Fur Company, otherwise known as "Ashley's Hundred," and leader of Hugh Glass's expedition

Major Andrew Henry (c. 1775 – January 10, 1832) was an American miner, army officer, frontiersman, trapper and entrepreneur. Alongside William H. Ashley, Henry was the co-owner of the successful Rocky Mountain Fur Company, otherwise known as "Ashley's Hundred", for the famous mountain men working for their firm from 1822 to 1832. Henry appears in the narrative poem the Song of Hugh Glass, which is part of the Neihardt's Cycle of the West. He is portrayed by John Huston in the 1971 film Man in the Wilderness and by Domhnall Gleeson in the 2015 film The Revenant, both of which depict Glass's bear attack and journey.

== Early life ==
Henry was born in or around 1776 in Fayette County, in the Province of Pennsylvania, and was tall and slender, with dark hair, blue eyes, and a reputation for honesty. Henry went to Nashville, Tennessee, in his twenties, but moved on to Spanish Upper Louisiana Territory in 1800 (before the Louisiana Purchase), to the lead mines near present-day Potosi, Missouri, and in 1806, he bought a share of a lead mine.

== Career ==
In 1807, he joined with Manuel Lisa and three members of the Corps of Discovery (George Drouillard, Peter M. Weiser, and John Potts) and founded Lisa, Menard & Morrison to establish trading and beaver trapping enterprises at the headwaters of the Missouri River. In 1809, Henry led an expedition to the Three Forks of the Missouri River near present-day Three Forks, Montana, where he tried to establish a beaver trapping outpost but was beaten back by the Blackfoot People. In 1810, Henry abandoned the Three Forks outpost and crossed the Continental Divide and briefly trapped the headwaters of the Snake River, wintering in caves and hovels that historians have named "Fort Henry" on Henry's Fork of the Snake River, near present-day Saint Anthony, Idaho.

After many difficulties, especially with the Blackfoot Indians, Henry returned to Saint Louis, Missouri in January, 1812. When the War of 1812 was declared Henry enrolled in the army, rising to the rank of major.

In 1818, Henry married Mary Flemming, daughter of one of the owners of the lead mine. Mary Flemming was of French birth and considerably younger than Henry; the marriage was a happy one for them both and produced four children. Henry returned to lead mining.

In 1822, he started what would become the Rocky Mountain Fur Company with William H. Ashley. The new company sent three keelboats up the Missouri River, three different times. Henry led an expedition of 21 men, 60 horses and one keelboat to the mouth of the Yellowstone River and built a post that came to be known as Fort Henry. The next boat, under the command of Daniel Moore, sank, along with ten thousand dollars' worth of provisions. Ashley equipped a third boat, piloted it himself, and was able to get through to Henry at the Yellowstone. Ashley then immediately returned to Saint Louis to make preparations for the following season.

In 1824, after a profitable season Henry retired from the company and returned, once more, to lead mining. He died in Washington County, Missouri on January 10, 1832.

== In popular culture ==
The actor Tris Coffin played Henry in the 1966 episode, "Hugh Glass Meets the Bear", on the syndicated television anthology series, Death Valley Days. John Alderson was cast as the rugged trail guide Hugh Glass, the trapper who was mauled by a bear, left for dead, but survived by crawling two hundred miles to safety. Others in the episode were Morgan Woodward as trapper Thomas Fitzpatrick and Victor French as Louis Baptiste. Actor/Director John Huston played Captain Henry, a character based on Andrew Henry, in the 1971 film: Man in the Wilderness. Richard Harris portrayed The Hugh Glass character. In the 2015 film The Revenant, Henry is played by Domhnall Gleeson. In the latter film, however, Henry is killed by John Fitzgerald (played by Tom Hardy). Actor Chris Brantley portrayed Henry in Season 2, Episode 5 of the INSP series Into the Wild Frontier.
