= Rudolf Friedrich Kurz =

Swiss painter (1818–1871)

Rudolph Friedrich Kurz
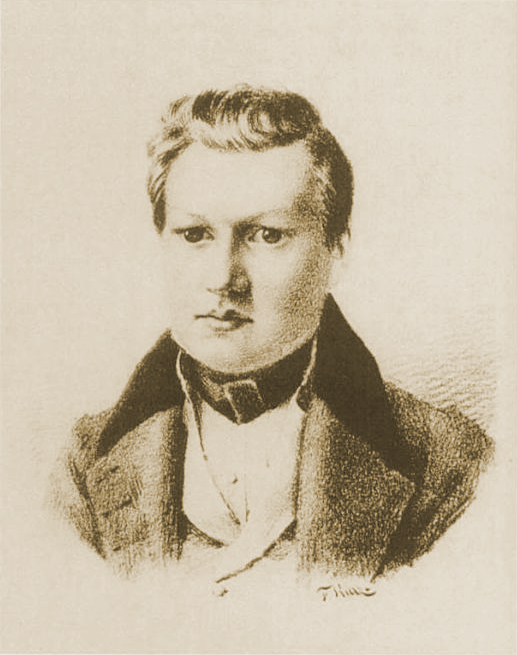
- Self-portrait
- Born: January 8, 1818. Bern, Switzerland
- Died: October 16, 1871 (aged 53); Bern, Switzerland
- Education: Bern University
- Occupations: writer, animal and landscape painter, teacher
- Writing career
- Notable work: The Journal of Rudolph Friederich Kurz

Rudolph Friedrich Kurz (1818–1871) was a Swiss painter and writer who traveled to the United States in order to paint and study the Native Americans. He is mostly known on account of his journals, in which he presents an account of and an interesting commentary on life in the mid-19th century along the Mississippi and upper Missouri rivers.

== Life ==
Rudolph Kurz was born in 1818 in Bern, Switzerland, to parents Maria Stooss and her husband Johannes Kurz. His father had immigrated to Switzerland from the German city of Reutlingen in 1806, settling in Langnau, Bern canton. The youth took drawing classes at the Bern gymnasium under Joseph Volmar. In 1838 he travelled to Paris to further his studies; there he met Alexander von Humboldt and Karl Bodmer. Upon returning to Bern (1842), he became head of painting class at the Fellenberg Institute in Hofwil. In 1846, he left Bern (and the Old Continent), taking a ship from a coastal port to the United States.

He traveled in the west, along the upper Mississippi and Missouri rivers, describing the peoples and regions in his journals. The time spent in the bustling frontier communities proved to be both fruitful and dangerous. He tried his luck in mining and horse trade (with no successes). In 1850 he married Witthae, daughter of Kirutshe, leader of an Iowa band, but the marriage did not last. Witthae ran away after two weeks, pining for her mother and people.

After four years in which Kurz struggled just to pay for his board and lodging, in June 1851 Kurz met Alexander Culbertson in Council Bluffs. He was hired and embarked the steamer St. Ange to Fort Fort Berthold in present-day central North Dakota, to clerk for the American Fur Company. During this period, Kurz also sketched the Native American peoples and scenes in the area. But he was told that the local Mandan and Hidatsa people believed that painting and drawing would bring ill luck. During the summer, a cholera epidemic broke out among the Indians, and nearly everyone except Kurz became ill. Blame for the sickness began to focus upon the artist, so he fled to Fort Union on August 18, 1851.

In Fort Union, Kurz had better opportunities to pursue his painting. The Bourgeois, or manager of the fort, Edwin Thompson Denig, commissioned the young Swiss man to paint and sketch various persons and places. Many of Kurz's sketches of Fort Union's interior were later relied on by National Park Service contractors to design that fort's partial reconstruction in 1989.

Kurz returned to Bern in 1852. He taught painting, first in the local gymnasium and later, at the closure of his life, at an Art School he established. One of his pupils was Fritz Schenk, who later emigrated to the US in 1870. He became an assistant to the trader at Fort Randall, South Dakota.

Upon his death on October 16, 1871, Rudolf Friedrich Kurz left numerous sketches, paintings (some of which were burned by his family due to nudity) and texts. He also had compiled a brief dictionary of Native American dialects.

== The Journal of Rudolph Friederich Kurz ==
Journals of Rudolph Friederich Kurz are the recorded recollections of Kurz from his journey along the Mississippi and Missouri rivers between 1846 and 1852. "My chief task in this work was to give from my observations a fair portrayal of the American Indian in his romantic mode of life, a true representation of the larger fur-bearing animals and of the native prairies and forests", he wrote. While working as a clerk at forts Berthold and Union he came to know both Indians, fur-trappers, officers and the condition in the harsh frontier. His journals are also an account of historically important facts- the Mormon migration, the '49 Gold Rush. The journals are an interesting analysis of the 1840s in the mid-west.

== Bibliography ==
- Biographical Note on Historisches Lexikon der Schweiz
- Biographical Note on North Dakota Online
