= Fur trade in Montana =

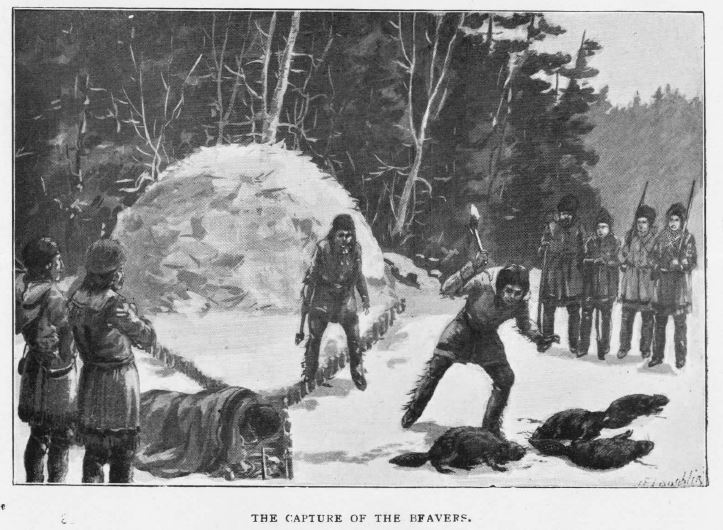
The Capture of the Beavers, Egerton R. Young's Winter Adventures of Three Boys in the Great Lone Land (1899)

The fur trade in Montana was a major period in the area's economic history from about 1800 to the 1850s. It also represents the initial meeting of cultures between indigenous peoples and those of European ancestry. British and Canadian traders approached the area from the north and northeast focusing on trading with the indigenous people, who often did the trapping of beavers and other animals themselves. American traders moved gradually up the Missouri River seeking to beat British and Canadian traders to the profitable Upper Missouri River region.

Indigenous peoples reacted to fur traders in a variety of ways, usually seeking to further their own interests in these economic dealings. Many times, various tribal groups cooperated with traders, but when indigenous interests were threatened, conflicts arose. The best example of conflict on the Upper Missouri was between American fur traders and trappers and the Blackfeet, particularly the Blood. Misunderstanding of indigenous peoples' interests by American traders inevitably led to violence and conflict.

Ultimately, the fur trade brought increased interactions between indigenous peoples and people of American and European ancestry. A capitalistic economic system was introduced to indigenous peoples impacting their cultures, along with deadly diseases that took a heavy toll in lives. The beaver population, and later the bison, were significantly diminished in the area that became the territory of, and subsequently, the state of Montana.

== Fur trade and indigenous people in Montana ==
At the start of the 19th century, the North American fur trade was expanding toward present-day Montana from two directions. Representatives of British and Canadian fur trade companies, primarily the Hudson's Bay Company and the North West Company, pushed west and south from their stronghold on the Saskatchewan River, while American trappers and traders followed the trail of the Lewis and Clark Expedition up the Missouri River from their base in St. Louis.

These traders competed not only in trapping fur-bearing animals, particularly the American beaver, but also in arranging trade relations with the many indigenous groups in the region, hoping to corner the market on these rich resources. For their part, the region's indigenous groups – particularly the Piegan (often called "Blackfeet" in the USA), the Crow, and the Salish and Kootenai – struggled to maintain control of their own lands and resources which supported their people and way of life. Each group interacted in the fur trade in different ways and to differing extents, yet all were changed by the important trading relations that developed from about 1805 through the 1860s.

=== Indigenous Women in the Fur Trade ===
Indigenous women across Montana played a vital and complex role in the development of the fur trade, acting as economic mediators, cultural brokers, and producers/consumers of trade goods and foodstuffs. Over time, as a distinct fur trade society evolved around company-operated outposts, cross-cultural sexual relationships and marriages became commonplace between Euro-American men and women from various tribal communities. These women became a force that held the European traders and the natives together because of kinship networks. These unions and the resultant family networks consolidated and cemented the political and economic ties at the heart of the emerging economy. Many native women occupied central positions of agency and influence, but also proved vulnerable to violence and disease. The women played a vital role in teaching the traders about the traditional ways to store and prepare food, as well as how to prepare clothing and blankets. After the seasons of trapping and trading were over, some women returned with the men to the east, while some men chose to stay with the women in the west.

Notable individuals include Natawista (also known as Natoapxíxina, Na-ta-wis-ta-cha and Natoyist-Siksina), who in 1840 married Major Alexander Culbertson, then the head of Fort Union, and Wambdi Autepewin, a Lakota woman widely known for her skills as a mediator. Countless others, however, produced necessary articles of clothing and food; prepared skins and tanned hides for market; offered their knowledge of local ecologies and geographies; and became inextricably involved in the multicultural exchange of the trade.

== British and Canadian traders ==
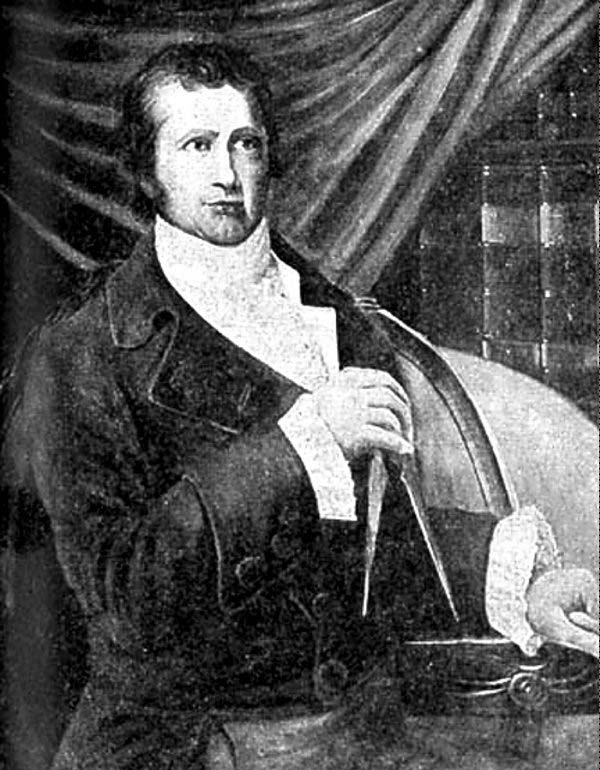
Cartographer and fur trader David Thompson

Even while Lewis and Clark struggled to make their way up and over the Rocky Mountains in the summer of 1805, a French Canadian trapper working for the North West Company, François Antoine Larocque explored part of the Yellowstone River drainage in what became southeastern Montana looking to arrange trading relations with Native Americans in the area, especially the Crow. Though his expedition succeeded, Larocque's long-term plans ultimately failed due to the difficulties of competing with the Hudson's Bay Company and aggressive American fur traders.

The North West Company's efforts to establish themselves west of the Continental Divide proved far more successful. Largely avoiding lands known to be within the Louisiana Purchase, the Nor'Westers, led by the Welsh-born geographer, David Thompson, worked their way to the headwaters of the Saskatchewan River and then turned southwestward into the headwaters of the Columbia River, the western boundary of the Columbia District of the British fur trade.

Thompson's men came into present-day northwestern Montana in 1808 and founded a post on the Kootenai River (near present-day Libby, Montana) to trade with the Native Americans of the same name. In November 1809, Thompson himself established the most important post in the area, Saleesh House, on the Clark Fork River near present-day Thompson Falls, Montana, named for the explorer. After many travels and amazingly accurate map-making in the area of the Clark Fork, Kootenai and Flathead rivers, Thompson left the region for good in 1812. Through Thompson's efforts and the continuing work of North West Company, and the later efforts of Hudson's Bay Company men like Alexander Ross and Peter Skene Ogden, this region came to be dominated by the British and Canadian fur trade for decades to come.

== American traders and trappers ==
=== Manuel Lisa ===
American fur traders quickly moved up the Missouri River following the Louisiana Purchase and Lewis and Clark's exploration. The first American fur post established in the region now known as Montana was completed in November 1807, and located at the confluence of the Yellowstone and Big Horn rivers by Manuel Lisa and his party of traders. Lisa called it Fort Remon for his son, but it was variously known as Lisa's Fort, or Fort Manuel.

From this post Lisa hoped to build a small empire for his fledgling Missouri Fur Company. His dream did not last, as he and his men were the first of many American fur traders to be attacked by groups of Piegan, Blood, and Gros Ventre. The post at the mouth of the Big Horn was abandoned by 1811 and Lisa's efforts ended in failure.

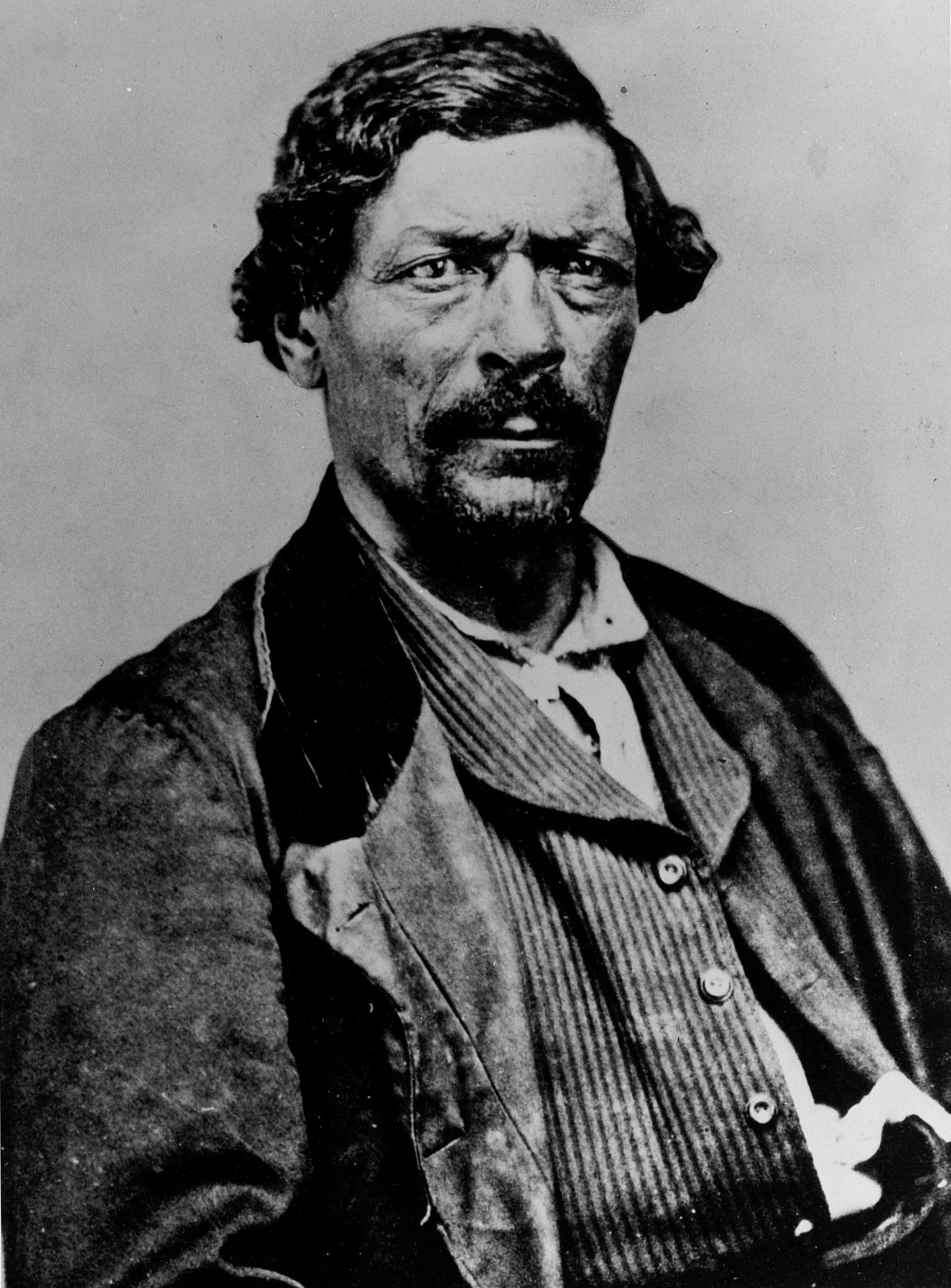
Trapper James Beckwourth

=== Andrew Henry, William H. Ashley, and Jedediah Smith ===
Taking game in Indian country by non-indigenous parties was against Federal law, but Federal officials were willing to turn a blind eye to the practice in order to encourage American occupation of the frontier and drive out the British. In 1822, Andrew Henry, formerly of the Missouri Fur Company, and William H. Ashley formed a partnership to enter the fur trade, and obtained a license "to carry on trade with the Indians up the Missouri," but their strategy was to rely predominantly on non-indigenous contract trappers and depend less on direct, formal trade with Native Americans. Henry and Ashley's trappers included Jim Bridger, Jedediah Strong Smith, and David Edward Jackson, and eventually William Sublette and James Beckwourth.

Henry and Ashley established operations on the upper Missouri River at Fort Henry, and most of the men stayed there through the winter of 1822-23. Smith and some other men had continued up the Missouri to the mouth of the Musselshell River in central Montana where they camped and trapped through the winter and spring, without any notable encounters with indigenous groups. However, in the spring of 1823, Henry took a party further up the Missouri to the Great Falls to try to establish a trading post, but an attack by the Piegans pushed him back. They retreated to Fort Henry but soon abandoned it and established a post two miles up the Yellowstone from the old Fort Remon near present-day Custer, Montana to trade with the more amicable Crow. The rest of the Ashley-Henry men were focusing their trapping in the Snake River country of present-day Idaho and ranged along rivers and streams in present-day Wyoming and Utah, so Henry arranged for a rendezvous in the spring of 1824 along the Sweetwater River in Wyoming. He picked up the winter's harvest of furs and made it back to St. Louis with half of them, then retired from the fur business.

Upon Henry's retirement, Ashley abandoned the idea of trading posts and initiated the free trapping and rendezvous system in 1825, taking on Smith as a partner. The new partnership avoided the more dangerous territories to the north, but the next year, in 1826, Smith, Sublette, and Jackson took over the company, and while Smith was engaged in his southwest expeditions, Jackson, Sublette and Robert Campbell made forays into Montana. In 1829, Smith led a trapping expedition into Piegan country. The next year, Smith and his partners sold out to Thomas Fitzpatrick, Baptiste Gervais, Jim Bridger, Milton Sublette and Henry Fraeb, who took the name Rocky Mountain Fur Company and set out with 200 men into the Great Falls area. The hunt was successful, but another attempt the next year was foiled by the Crows running off their horses.

=== American Fur Company ===
The steamboat Yellowstone (1833)

John Jacob Astor's American Fur Company (AFC) set up operations in St. Louis in 1822. By 1828 they arrived in the upper Missouri River region. Scotsman Kenneth McKenzie, intent on breaking into the Upper Missouri—the elusive prize of the Western fur trade—established what became Fort Union near the confluence of the Missouri and Yellowstone rivers. The Piegan were surprisingly ready to trade with the AFC. In 1830 McKenzie negotiated an agreement with a Piegan band, and sent James Kipp to the mouth of the Marias River in 1831 to organize a trading post on Piegan lands.

The AFC soon established a similar post to trade with the Crow on the Yellowstone. In 1832, the paddle steamer Yellowstone was the first to reach Fort Union. Steamboats, being able to haul larger loads, provided a decided transportation advantage to the AFC thereafter.

Astor's company dominated the trade in the entire Missouri River region, wresting the lucrative Upper Missouri trade from the Hudson's Bay Company traders to the north who had traded with the Piegan for decades. Unable to match the resources of the AFC, their main American rival, the Rocky Mountain Fur Company sold out in 1834. Within their history in Montana, the AFC controlled at least nine posts, enabling them to become successful among the other companies.

== Consequences of the fur trade in Montana ==
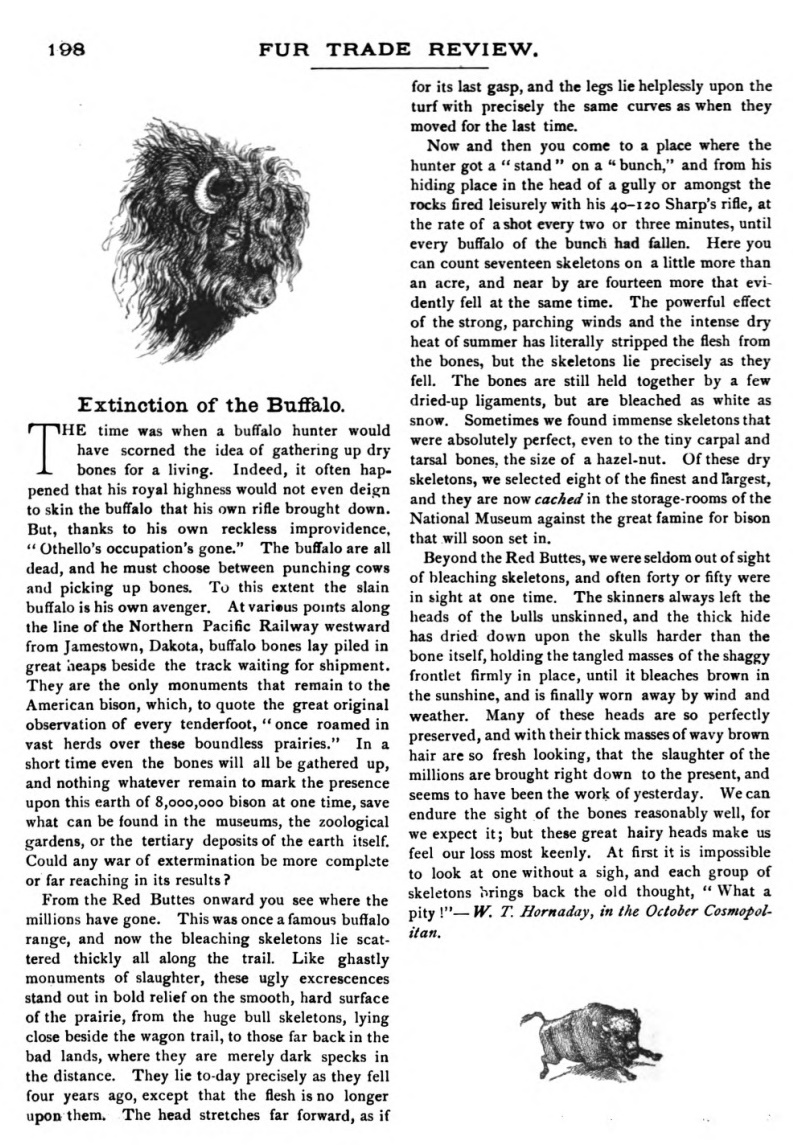
Fur Trade Review (1887). "Extinction of the Buffalo"

The coming of the fur trade to Montana brought several substantial results. First of all, the land and its resources became better known, maps were filled in and became more accurate. The trappers played an important role in determining where the United States and Canada border is. As Montana historian K. Ross Toole put it, "Before the emigrant's wagon ever rolled a mile, before the miner found his first color, before the government authorized a single road or trail, this inhospitable land had been traversed and mapped."

A negative consequence of the trade was its impact on fur-bearing animals, initially the beaver and later the American bison or buffalo, whose populations were pushed to the brink. Eventually, the fur trade began to slow, around the late 1700's, primarily dur to the rapidly declining populations, and the price of beaver pelts dropped because of the switch to silk, from fur. The worst consequence physically was the ravages of European diseases such as smallpox being increasingly spread to Native Americans by traders and trappers.

Finally, for those indigenous peoples who survived, the fur trade intensified the introduction of Western European ideals of commerce and religion, since the beaver trade was an extension of global capitalism and also indirectly led to the spread of Roman Catholic Christianity to some of the tribes. These changes greatly impacted the Native Americans of the region, challenging their already distressed way of life and changing their world forever.

Today, Montana is home to two major national parks, Glacier and Yellowstone. Here you can find the wildlife population to be protected, in hopes that the populations can be healthily restored. Beaver and bison populations are returning, in turn restoring ecosystems all across the state, including on tribal lands.

== See also ==
- List of fur trading posts in Montana
- Rocky Mountain Rendezvous
