= Charles Larpenteur =

American fur trader (1803–1872)

Charles Eugene Larpenteur
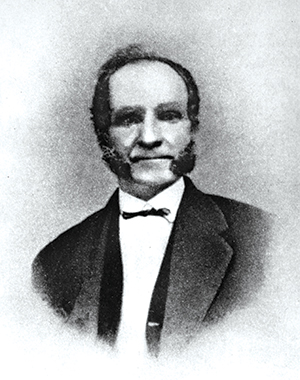
- Born: May 8, 1803; Fontainebleau, France
- Died: November 15, 1872 (aged 69); Little Sioux, Iowa
- Citizenship: American
- Occupation: Fur trader
- Known for: His memoir, Forty Years a Fur Trader
- Spouses: Unknown Assiniboine; Makes Cloud; Rebecca Bingham
- Parents: Louis Benoist Larpenteur; Marguerite Auguste, née Michin

Charles Larpenteur (1803–1872) was an American fur trader whose memoir and diary frequently have been used as sources about fur trade history.

== Fur trade ==
Larpenteur was the son of a Bonapartiste gentleman who left France in disgust after the Bourbon restoration, and settled in Baltimore with his family. As a young adult Larpenteur moved to St. Louis. In 1833 he took employment as a common engagé with the Rocky Mountain Fur Company. The outfit under Robert Campbell first moved overland, with pack train and cattle, to the Green River rendezvous. After having completed its business there, the outfit continued to the mouth of the Yellowstone River, where it built Fort William, in close vicinity to the competing American Fur Company's already standing Fort Union. William Sublette, almost as soon as the post was finished, sold Fort William to the American Fur Company, and Larpenteur became a clerk at Fort Union under Kenneth McKenzie. He served the company and its successor (Bernard Pratte & Company, and Pierre Chouteau Jr. & Company) for many years, mostly at Fort Union. During that period, Larpenteur built Fort Alexander, a trading post for the Crow Nation on the Yellowstone River, after having set fire to the deserted Fort Van Buren, in the vicinity.

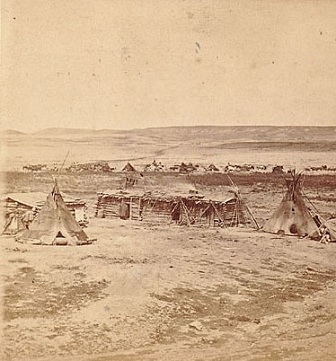
Charles Larpenteur's trading post at Fort Union.

In 1860, Larpenteur became partner in an independent fur trading venture, Larpenteur, Smith & Company. The outfit went west over St. Paul and Pembina, and Larpenteur erected a trading post at Poplar River. Back in St. Louis in 1861, the company was reorganized as Larpenteur, Lemon & Company, due to dissension among the original partners. The same year, 1862, Larpenteur became a fur trader with a new company, La Barge, Harkness & Company. In 1864 Larpenteur was back at Fort Union, now as Bourgeois or manager. Within a short time, however, the fort was sold the new Northwestern Fur Company, and Larpenteur resigned. In 1866 he served as an Assiniboine interpreter for the Indian Peace Commission, and the following year he became a fur trader for Durfee & Peck, but was fired after a conflict. In 1869, Larpenteur brought his family from Iowa to Fort Buford, where he established a trading post. New regulations in 1870 limited the number of traders to one approved sutler per military post, and Larpenteur applied to the secretary of war, William W. Belknap for approval. This was, however, refused, and Larpenteur returned with his family to Iowa, where he died in 1872.

== Diary and memoir ==
During his forty years in the fur trade Larpenteur diligently kept a diary, using it as a source to complement his memory when he wrote his memoir. Unable to finance publication of the memoir, he sent the manuscript to Washington Matthews, a U.S. Army surgeon he had known at Fort Buford. At the end of the century, Matthews transferred the manuscript to Elliott Coues, a brother officer in the Medical Corps, and an annotated version (the Coues edition) was hence published in 1898. Milo Quaife later reedited Larpenteur's manuscript as close as possible to its original form, a version (the Quaife edition) which was published in 1933. Through Auguste L. Larpenteur of Saint Paul, Minnesota, a nephew of Larpenteur's, Coues had access to the original diary and other documents of Larpenteur's when he edited the memoir. The original diary was, however, not published until 2007. Today, three original diaries and a cashbook are in the Minnesota Historical Society.

== Personal life ==
Larpenteur was married three times. His first wife was an Assiniboine woman who died in 1837; her name has not been preserved for posterity. His second wife was another Assiniboine woman, Makes Cloud, with whom he had five children; she was killed by the Omaha in 1853. His third wife was an American woman, a widow with the name of Rebecca Bingham, with whom he had one child. All of his children predeceased him. Larpenteur started a farm outside Little Sioux, Iowa, calling it Fontainebleau after his birthplace, and settling his family on it. It was here his second wife was killed by hostile Omaha people while picking berries.
