= List of fur trading posts in Montana =

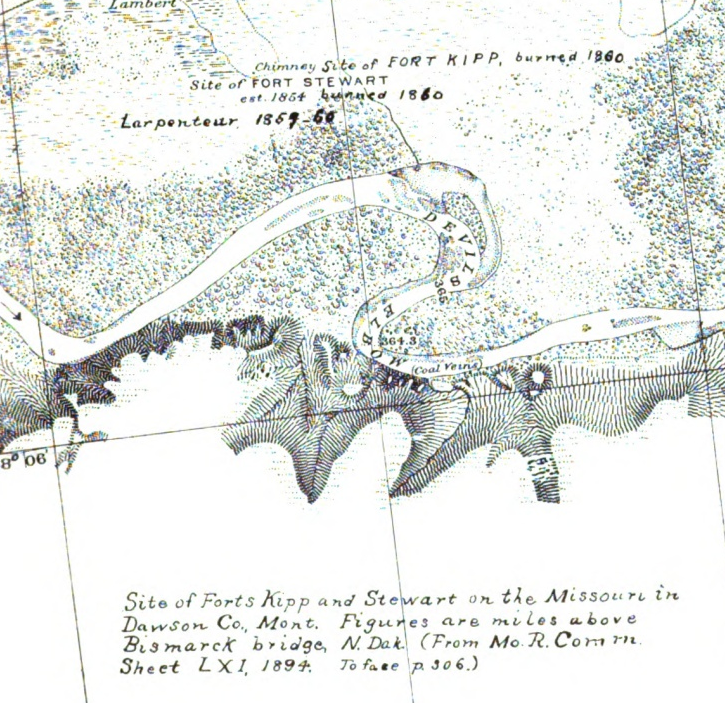
The site of Forts Kipp and Stewart near the Missouri

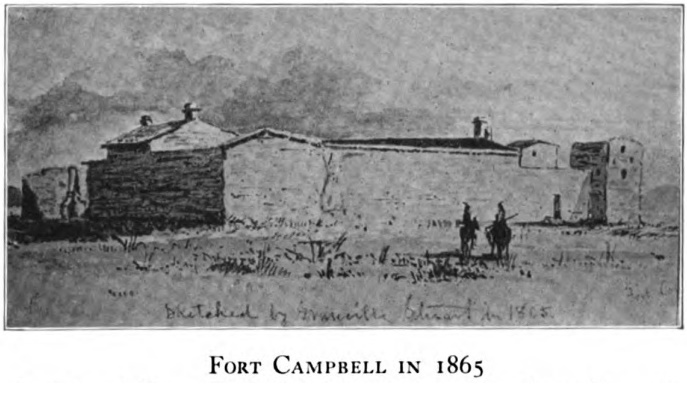
A sketch of Fort Campbell

This is an alphabetically arranged list of trading posts or forts in present-day Montana from 1807 to the end of the fur trading era in the state.

== History ==
The North West Company fur trader Francois-Antoine Larocque travelled parts of the eastern present-day Montana in 1805, and the following explorations of the Lewis and Clark Expedition opened the area further for commerce. The first fur trading post built in the future state was Fort Raymond at the confluence of Yellowstone River and Bighorn River, where it carried out trade with the Crow Nation from 1807 to around 1813. Soon after the establishment of Fort Raymond, trail-blazers from the fur companies found way to the heart of the country of every Native Nation in the territory. Decade by decade, at number of smaller and bigger posts established by different trading companies from both Canada and the United States dotted the banks of the major rivers winding their way through the plains and mountain valleys. The biggest forts stayed active year after year, while others lasted a season and were destroyed by wind and weather or burned by Native Americans. Some of the ruins and old places of bargain are now recognized as historic sites by the United States or Montana.

== List ==
Name	Other names	Location	County	Company	Active	Main customers	Remarks
Big Horn Post#2		Confluence of the Bighorn and the Yellowstone	Treasure	Rocky Mountain Fur Company	1824– ?	The Crow	
Brazeau Houses	Braseau's Houses	Extreme lower Yellowstone	Richland		1828– ?		
Fort Alexander		North side of the Yellowstone, six miles west of Forsyth	Rosebud	American Fur Company	1842–1850	The Crow	
Fort Andrew		At the Missouri, 30 miles east of James Kipp Recreation Area	Phillips	American Fur Company	1862– ?		Inundated
Fort Benton (#1)		At the confluence of the Bighorn and the Yellowstone	Treasure	Missouri Fur Company	1821– 1824?	The Crow	
Fort Benton	Fort Lewis, Fort Clay	At the Upper Missouri, city of Fort Benton	Chouteau	American Fur Company	1846–1864	The Blackfeet	National Historic Landmark
Fort Campbell		Near the city of Fort Benton	Chouteau	Harvey, Primeau & Co.	1846–1861		
Fort Cass		At the confluence of the Bighorn and the Yellowstone	Treasure	American Fur Company	1832–1838	The Crow	
Fort Chardon	Fort F. A. Chardon	At the confluence of the Judith and the Missouri	Chouteau		1843– ?		
Fort Charles		At the Missouri, right east of Oswego	Valley		1861– ?		
Fort Connah		Near Post Creek	Lake	Hudson's Bay Company	1845–1871		
Fort Cotton		At the upper Missouri, 10 miles southwest of Fort Benton	Chouteau	Union Fur Company	1843– ? (short-lived)		
Fort Dauphin		At the Missouri, south of Nashua	Valley	Louis Dauphin	1860– ?		
Fort Galpin		At the Missouri, near the city of Fort Peck	Valley	LaBarge, Harkness and Company	1862–1864		
Fort Hawley		At the Missouri, 30 miles east of James Kipp Recreation Area	Phillips	Northwest Fur Company	1866– ?		Inundated
Fort Jackson		At the Missouri, near Poplar	Roosevelt	American Fur Company	1833– ? (short-lived)		
Fort Kipp		At the Missouri, near the city of Fort Kipp	Roosevelt		1860-1860		Burned by Native Americans
Fort LaBarge		At the Missouri, near the city of Fort Benton	Chouteau	LaBarge, Harkness and Company	1862– ?		
Fort Lewis		At the Missouri, west of the city of Fort Benton	Chouteau	American Fur Company	? – 1847		Dismantled and rebuilt as part of Fort Benton
Fort McKenzie	Fort Brulé	At the Missouri, east of the city of Fort Benton	Chouteau	American Fur Company	1832–1843	The Blackfeet	Burned by Native Americans
Fort Owen		Bitterroot Valley, east of Stevensville	Ravalli	Major John Owen	1850–1872	The Bitterroot Salish	Now a state park
Fort Piegan		At the confluence of the Marias and the Missouri	Chouteau		1831–1832	The Blackfeet	Burned by Native Americans
Fort Poplar		At the Missouri, near Poplar	Roosevelt	A Charles Larpenteur post	1861– ?		
Fort Raymond	Fort Remon, Fort Lisa, Fort Manuel Lisa, Big Horn Post	At the confluence of the Yellowstone and the Bighorn	Treasure	Missouri Fur Company	1807–1813(?)	The Crow	
Fort Sarpy I		On the north side of the Yellowstone, 10 miles east of Forsyth	Rosebud	American Fur Company	1850–1856	The Crow	
Fort Sarpy II		At the Yellowstone, 10 miles east of the mouth of the Bighorn	Treasure	American Fur Company	1857– c. 1860	The Crow	
Fort Stewart		At the Missouri, near the City of Fort Kipp	Roosevelt	Frost, Todd and Company	1854–1860		Burned by Native Americans
Fort Union		At the Missouri, right east of the Montana – North Dakota border	Right east of Roosevelt	American Fur Company	1828–1867	The Assiniboine and Cree	National Park Service Area
Fort Van Buren	Fort Tulloch, Fort Tullock and Tulloch's Fort	At the Yellowstone, 10 miles east of Forsyth	Rosebud	American Fur Company	1835–1842	The Crow	
Fox, Livingston and Company Post		At the confluence of the Little Bighorn and the Bighorn	Big Horn	Fox, Livingston and Company	1843– ?	The Crow	(Only has a trading post of this name here)
Henry's Fort	Three Forks Post	A mile east of Three Forks	Gallatin	Missouri Fur Company	1810– ?		
Howse's Post	Howse House	North of Kalispell	Flathead	Hudson's Bay Company	1810– ?	The Pend d'Oreilles and Salish	
Kootenai Post I		At Kootenai River, near Libby	Lincoln	North West Fur Company	1808– ?	The tribes at the upper Columbia	
Kootenai Post II		Near Libby Dam	Lincoln		1811– ?		
Salish House I	Saleesh House, Flathead Post	Near Thompson Falls	Sanders	North West Fur Company	1809– ?		
Salish House II		Ten miles east of Thompson Falls	Sanders	Hudson's Bay Company	1824– ?		

== Map ==
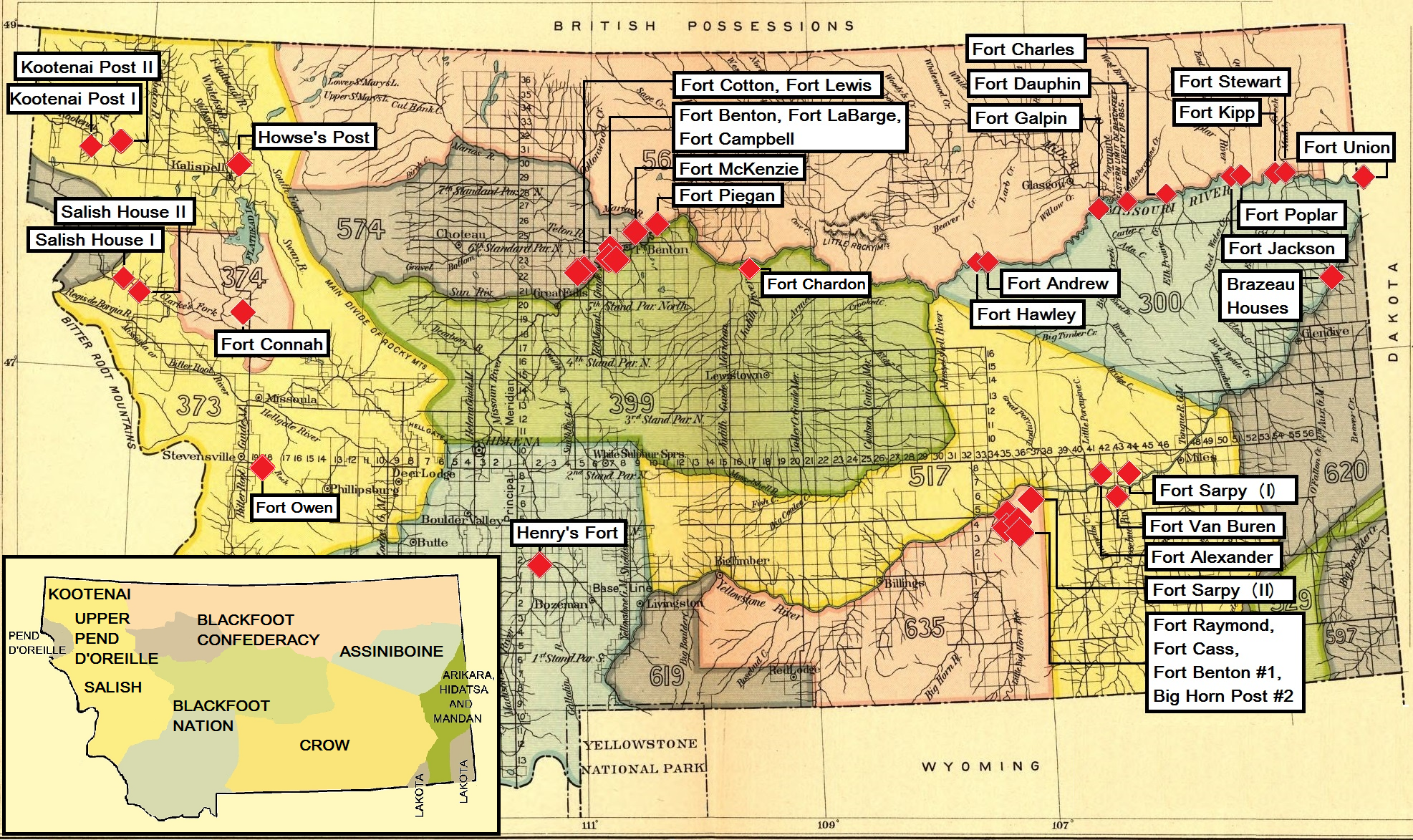
Map with many of the fur trading posts in Montana from 1807 to the early 1870s (map only approximately). The colours on the map show the different Indian territories as described in the first treaties between the Native American tribes in the area and the United States
