= Columbia Fur Company =

Dissolved fur and Native American trade company

- Company type: General partnership
- Industry: Fur trade, Native American trade
- Founded: 1821
- Founder: Joseph Renville, Kenneth McKenzie, William Laidlaw, Daniel Lamont
- Defunct: 1827
- Fate: Dissolved
- Successor: American Fur Company
- Headquarters: St. Louis
- Area served: Green Bay, Minnesota River, Lake Traverse, Missouri River

Columbia Fur Company was a fur trading and Native American trading business active from 1821 to 1827, in Michigan Territory and in the unorganized territory of the United States. It then became the Upper Missouri Outfit of the American Fur Company.

== Formation ==
The company was founded in 1821, when the Hudson's Bay Company and the North West Company merged, and a large number of fur traders found themselves out of job. The founders, Joseph Renville, Kenneth McKenzie, William Laidlaw and Daniel Lamont were all British subjects, so they arranged for the company's activities to be officially carried out by William P. Tilton & Co., a New York company operating out of Saint Louis.

== Operations ==
The company opened four trading posts at the Minnesota River in competition with the American Fur Company. Trading posts were also built at Lake Traverse and at Green Bay. Soon, however, the operations were extended to the West. In 1823, the company built a trading post, Fort Tilton, by the Mandan villages on the Missouri River. The company eagerly participated in the trade with the Sioux and the Cheyenne on the Northern Plains. In competition with Pierre Chouteau Jr. and other fur traders from Saint Louis, the company built several trading posts on the Missouri River extending its trade to the Ponca and Omaha trade. The axle of the trade was Fort Tecumseh built where the Teton River merges with the Missouri. The company's posts were supplied from its headquarters at Lake Traverse.

== Dissolution ==
The company was bought by John Jacob Astor in 1827, and reorganized as the Upper Missouri Outfit of the Western Department of the American Fur Company, withdrawing its operations on the Great Lakes and leaving it to the Northern Department of the American Fur Company. Pierre Chouteau Jr. became the chief executive of the Western Department, while Kenneth McKenzie became manager of the Upper Missouri Outfit, operating above the mouth of the Big Sioux River. McKenzie built Fort Union at the mouth of the Yellowstone River as the Outfit's center of operations.

== Trading posts ==
- Fort Floyd 1826
- Fort Lookout 1822, near Fort Kiowa.
- Fort Tecumseh 1822
- Ponca Post, near Nanza just below the mouth of the Niobrara River.
- Tilton's Post or Tilton's Fort, built in 1822 on the opposite site of the Missouri from the Mandan villages. In 1823 the post was moved to the villages, to get protection from Arikara attacks.
- Post at the mouth of White Earth River, 1825-1831. Replaced by Fort Clark.

When Columbia Fur Company sold out to Astor in 1827, the following posts were included in the deal:

- Council Bluff
- Vermillion
- Rivière à Jacques
- Ponca Post
- Fort Tecumseh
- Mandan Villages
