= John C. Ewers =

American ethnologist (1909–1997)

John Canfield Ewers
- John C. Ewers
- Born: July 21, 1909; Cleveland, Ohio
- Died: May 7, 1997 (aged 87); Arlington, Virginia
- Education: Dartmouth College (B.A.); Yale University (M.A.)
- Known for: Studies on the culture and history of the American Plains Indians
- Scientific career
- Fields: Ethnology
- Workplaces: Smithsonian Institution; National Museum of American History

John Canfield Ewers (July 21, 1909 – May 7, 1997) was an American ethnologist and museum curator. Known for his studies on the art and history of the American Plains Indians, he was described by The New York Times as one of his country's "foremost interpreters of American Indian culture."

He was instrumental in establishing the National Museum of American History and became its Director in 1964. At the time of his death he was Ethnologist Emeritus of the Smithsonian Institution. He was the first recipient of the Smithsonian's Exceptional Service Award. In addition, he received the Western History Association's Oscar O. Winther Award and the American Alliance of Museums's Distinguished Service Award.

== Biography ==
John C. Ewers was born in Cleveland, Ohio, on July 21, 1909, to Mary Alice and John Ray Ewers. He was delivered by his maternal grandmother, Dr. Martha Ann Canfield, who was among the earliest women to practice medicine in Northern Ohio. He attended local schools.

He studied at Dartmouth College as an undergraduate, receiving his B.A. in 1931. Following graduation, he studied painting and drawing for a year at the Art Students League of New York before beginning post-graduate studies at Yale University in 1932. There, he studied the art and culture of the American Plains Indians under Clark Wissler; he received his master's degree with Honors in 1934. His Masters thesis formed the basis of his 1939 book, Plains Indian Painting: A Description of an Aboriginal American Art, the first of his many books and monographs on this subject.

After earning his master's at Yale, Ewers took courses at Columbia University while studying the collections at the Heye Foundation's Museum of the American Indian and the American Museum of Natural History in New York City. He was selected as a Field Curator with the National Park Service in 1935. During his time with the National Park Service, he worked at Vicksburg National Military Park and Yosemite National Park, where he helped with renovation of the Indian Room. In 1941 he was hired by the Bureau of Indian Affairs to design and establish the Museum of the Plains Indian in Browning, Montana. He combined this work with his own extensive field work on the art, culture, and history of the Blackfeet Tribe.

In 1946, after two years of service with the US Navy in the Pacific during World War II, Ewers joined the Smithsonian Institution as Associate Curator of Ethnology. At first he developed museum exhibits and worked on the Smithsonian's modernization program. He became Planning Officer for the Smithsonian's Museum of History and Technology (now the National Museum of American History) in 1956, was appointed its assistant director in 1959, and was named the museum's Director shortly after it opened in 1964. Ewers retired in 1979 as the Smithsonian's senior research anthropologist with the title Enthnologist Emeritus.

He continued to research, write, and attend conferences up until his death. He also taught at Texas Christian University in 1981. During the 1970s he had served as a trustee and research associate of the Museum of the American Indian in New York.

== Personal life ==
Ewers met Margaret Elizabeth Dumville in summer 1932. He had finished the first year of his post-graduate studies at Yale and she was a student at Columbia. They married in 1934 and had two daughters, Jane Ewers Robinson born in 1938, and Diane Ewers Peterson born in 1944. Margaret collaborated closely with Ewers in his field work with the Blackfeet in Montana. She directed the newly established Museum of the Plains Indian during the two years he served in the Navy. Their 53-year marriage ended with her death in June 1988.

John Ewers spent his last years in Arlington, Virginia, where he died on May 7, 1997, at the age of 87. A memorial service was held for him on June 17, 1997, at the Carmichael Auditorium in the National Museum of American History.

After his death, the Western History Association established the John C. Ewers Prize, awarded biennially for the best book on the North American Indian ethnohistory. In 2003, The People of the Buffalo: Essays in Honor of John C. Ewers, was published by Tatanka Press. In 2011, The University of Oklahoma Press published Plains Indian Art: The Pioneering Work of John C. Ewers. The latter book, edited by his daughter Jane Ewers Robinson, is a collection of her father's writings that were originally published in American Indian Art Magazine and other periodicals between 1968 and 1992.

== Honors and awards ==
Ewers received numerous honors:

- First Recipient of the Smithsonian Institution's Exceptional Service Award (1965).
- Honorary Doctorate from University of Montana (1965)
- Honorary Doctorate from Dartmouth College (1967)
- Oscar O. Winther Award from the Western History Association (1976)
- Lifetime Achievement Award from the Native American Art Studies Association (1989)
- Distinguished Service Award from the American Alliance of Museums (1996)

== Publications ==
During his career, Ewers wrote many scholarly articles, monographs, and books, as well as articles for general interest magazines such as American Heritage. He also edited and wrote the introductions to 19th-century accounts of American Indian culture by Zenas Leonard, Edwin Thompson Denig, George Catlin, and Jean-Louis Berlandier.

Ewers's publications include:

Books and monographs

- Plains Indian Painting: A Description of an Aboriginal American Art (Stanford University Press, 1939)
- The Story of the Blackfeet (U.S. Bureau of Indian Affairs/Haskell Press, 1944)
- Blackfeet Crafts (U.S. Bureau of Indian Affairs, 1945)
- The Horse in Blackfoot Indian Culture (Smithsonian Institution, Bureau of American Ethnology, 1955)
- The Blackfeet: Raiders on the Northwestern Plains (University of Oklahoma Press, 1958)
- Crow Indian Beadwork: A Descriptive and Historical Study, co-authored with William Wildschut (Museum of the American Indian, Heye Foundation, 1959)
- Artists of the Old West (Doubleday, 1965)
- Indian Life on the Upper Missouri (University of Oklahoma Press, 1968)
- Blackfeet Indian Tipis: Design and Legend (Museum of the Rockies, Montana State University, 1976)
- Murals in the Round: Painted Tipis of the Kiowa and Kiowa-Apache Indians (Smithsonian Institution Press, 1978)
- Plains Indian Sculpture: a Traditional Art from America's Heartland (Smithsonian Institution Press, 1986)
- Plains Indian History and Culture: Essays on Continuity and Change (University of Oklahoma Press, 1997)

Edited books

- Adventures of Zenas Leonard, Fur Trader (University of Oklahoma Press, 1959)
- Five Indian Tribes of the Upper Missouri, by Edwin Thompson Denig (1812–1858) (University of Oklahoma Press, 1961)
- George Catlin's O-kee-pa (Yale University Press, 1967)
- Indians in Texas in Eighteen Thirty by Jean-Louis Berlandier (1805–1851) (Smithsonian Institution Press, 1969)

Articles

- "Early White Influence Upon Plains Indian Painting: George Catlin and Karl Bodmer among the Mandan, 1832-34". Smithsonian Miscellaneous Collections, Vol. 134, No. 7. (Smithsonian Institution Press, 1957)
- "Hair Pipes in Plains Indian Adornment: A Study in Indian and White Ingenuity". Bureau of American Ethnology Bulletin 164, 1957, pp. 29–85
- "Mothers of the Mixed-Bloods: The Marginal Woman in the History of the Upper Missouri" in Probing the American West (Museum of New Mexico Press, 1962)
- "The Emergence of the Plains Indian as the Symbol of the North American Indian", Annual Report of the Smithsonian Institution, 1964, pp. 531–544
- "Plains Indian Reactions to the Lewis and Clark Expedition", Montana: The Magazine of Western History, Vol. 16, No. 1, Winter 1966, pp. 2–12
- "Intertribal Warfare as the Precursor of Indian-White Warfare on the Northern Great Plains", Western Historical Quarterly, October 1975 (Winner of the Oscar O. Winther Award)
- "Images of the White Man in 19th Century Plains Indian Art" in The Visual Arts, Plastic and Graphic (Mouton, 1979)
- "Climate, Acculturation, and Costume: A History of Women's Clothing among the Indians of the Southern Plains". Plains Anthropologist, Vol. 24, 1980, pp. 63–82

== Sources ==
- Bozeman Daily Chronicle (May 17, 1997). "Obituary John C. Ewers". Retrieved 1 May 2012.
- Dittemore, Margaret R. (1999). "John C. Ewers. Natural and Physical Sciences Department, Smithsonian Institution Libraries. Retrieved 1 May 2012.
- Hagan, William T. (1997). "Foreword" to Ewers, John Canfield. Plains Indian History and Culture: Essays on Continuity and Change, pp. xiii-xvii. University of Oklahoma Press. ISBN 0806129433
- McElrath, Susan (2003). Register to the Papers of John Canfield Ewers. National Anthropological Archives, Smithsonian Institution. Retrieved 1 May 2012.
- Saxon, Wolfgang (May 27, 1997). "John Canfield Ewers, Ethnologist, Dies at 87". The New York Times. Retrieved 1 May 2012.
- Ubelaker, Douglas H. and Viola, Herman J. (eds.) (1982). Plains Indian Studies: A Collection of Essays in Honor of John C. Ewers and Waldo R. Wedel. Smithsonian Contributions to Anthropology Number 30. Smithsonian Institution Press
