= Alexander Culbertson =

American fur trader and government agent

Major Alexander Culbertson
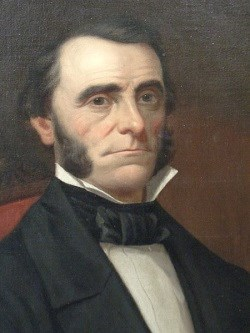
- Culbertson in 1854
- Born: May 16, 1809; Near Chambersburg, Pennsylvania
- Died: August 27, 1879 (aged 70); Orleans, Nebraska
- Occupation: Fur trader
- Years active: 1829–1879
- Known for: Founded Fort Benton, Montana; interpreter and special agent for the U.S. Government.
- Spouse: Natawista Iksina

Alexander Culbertson (1809–1879), was an American fur trader who founded Fort Benton, Montana, and was a special government agent who played an important role in the negotiations leading to the 1851 treaty of Fort Laramie. Later, Culbertson and his wife Natawista Iksina negotiated with the Blackfoot Confederacy to let the northern Pacific railroad survey of 1853 continue unharmed.

== Early life ==
Culbertson was born in Chambersburg, Pennsylvania in 1809. His family was of Scots-Irish ancestry, and he was named for his great-grandfather. He left the family home in 1826, when he followed his uncle, John Craighead Culbertson, a sutler with the army, to Florida. There, under his uncle's tutelage, he traveled throughout the south and learned the rudiments of trade.

In 1827, he came to St. Louis where he made his first contacts with John Jacob Astor's American Fur Company, then managed by Pierre Chouteau, Jr. He and his uncle did not stay in the area, but instead traveled to the Minnesota frontier and traded with Native people there.

== In the west ==
In 1833, Culbertson returned to St. Louis and signed a three-year contract with the American Fur Company, beginning work as a clerk. After reaching Fort Union, his boss, Kenneth McKenzie, assigned him to Fort McKenzie, in present-day Montana. Three weeks after he arrived, he married a Piegan woman, whose name was not recorded. It is unclear how long this first marriage lasted. He became Bourgeois (Manager) of the Fort in 1834.

Culbertson came back to Fort Union in 1840. That year, he married Natawista Iksina, a young Kainah woman, daughter of a powerful Kainah leader, Two Suns. She was about 15 and he was about 30. The couple had five children.

Culbertson rose to become superintendent of the Upper Missouri Outlet, overseeing all Company forts on the Yellowstone and Upper Missouri Rivers until 1847. He established several other trading outposts. The uppermost was Fort Lewis, founded in 1846. Originally located about 15 miles farther upstream from its present-day location, Culbertson moved the Fort and rebuilt it in 1847, and it was officially renamed Fort Benton in 1850.

In 1851 he became a special agent for government negotiations with the Plains Indians, and played a significant role negotiating the Treaty of Fort Laramie. Later he and his wife persuaded the Blackfoot Confederacy to let the northern Pacific railroad survey of 1853, under Isaac I. Stevens, continue unharmed.

== Later life ==
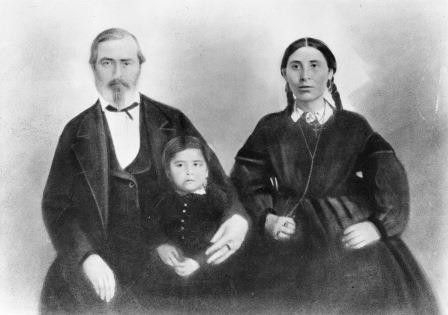
The Culbertson family in 1863.

In 1858, after having amassed a fortune estimated at $300,000 ($11.2 million in 2025), the Culbertsons and three of their children moved to Peoria, Illinois. There they purchased a farm and luxurious home. The property was named Locust Grove. The girls were sent to be educated in private religious schools. During their time in Illinois, Alexander and Natawista formalized their marriage in a Catholic ceremony on September 9, 1859.

Culbertson was bankrupted by a series of poor investments and returned west in 1868. Some point after 1870, their return to Fort Benton, his wife left him and returned to her people. Culbertson died in 1879, at the home of his son-in-law, George H. Roberts, Attorney General of Nebraska, who was married to his oldest daughter, Julia.
