= Ella N. McLean, Countess Norraikow =

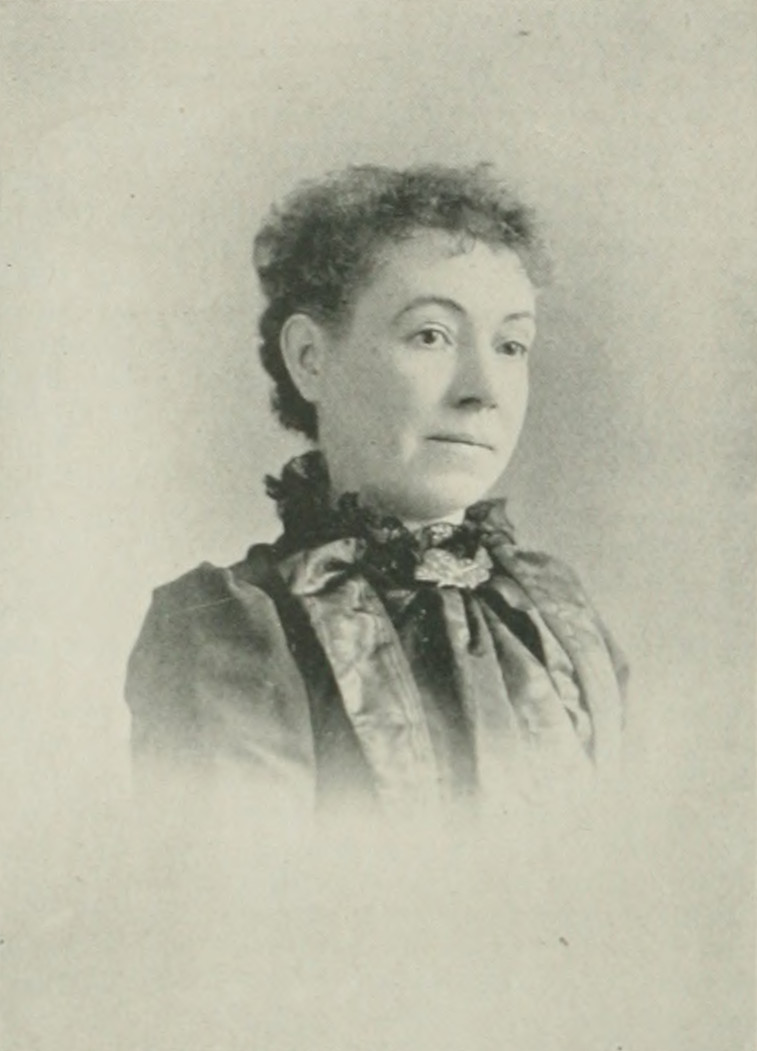
- Portrait photo from A Woman of the Century
- Born: Ella Dougherty; 9 November 1853/1858; Toronto, Canada
- Died: September 26, 1913; Elizabeth, New Jersey, U.S.
- Occupations: author; metaphysician
- Spouses: Alexander Miles Seely (m. 1872; died 1882); Count Adolphus Norraikow (m. 1885; died 1892); John Emery McLean (m. 1898)
- Children: 3

Ella N. McLean, Countess Norraikow (née, Dougherty; after adoption, Walton, after first marriage, Seely; after second marriage, Norraikow; after third marriage, McLean; 1853/1858-1913) was a Canadian author and metaphysician. She wrote for several journals and was a literary authority on Russian affairs. She was regarded as one of the "noted women of the American metropolis" and traveled internationally for several years.

== Early life and education ==
Ella Dougherty was born in Toronto, Canada, 9 November 1853/58. Orphaned at a young age, William Walton of Saint John, New Brunswick adopted Ella. Walton’s household provided Ella with stability and a supportive environment, which fostered her growth during a critical period of her life.

She was educated in Saint John, New Brunswick.

== Career ==
Norraikow began publishing literary works while in her teens.

On January 2, 1872, in Saint John, New Brunswick, she married Capt. Alexander Miles Seely (1846-1882), a son of Hon. Alexander McLaughlin Seely, a prominent statesman of the Dominion of Canada. Their three daughters were born in 1874, 1877, and 1881. Soon after this marriage, the couple went abroad and spent many years traveling, having crossed the Atlantic 18 times. She visited various cities in India and other parts of the Orient, returning to the West and spending some months traveling through South America. She returned to North America as a widow and relocated to New York City.

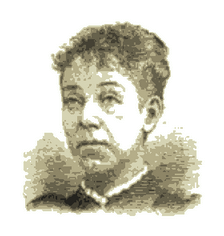
(1891)

On July 28, 1885, in Manhattan, she married Count Adolphus Norraikow (Warsaw, Russian Empire, 1844 - 1892), a Russian nobleman. She subsequently conducted a deep study of the methods of government that prevailed in her husband's native land, where the count was a lawyer. Because of his political opinions, he had been in exile for many years.

To Lippincott's Monthly Magazine, the Cosmopolitan Magazine, the New York Ledger, the Independent," the Harper publications, the Youth's Companion. and various other leading periodicals of the U.S., Norraikow contributed many articles on the political and social conditions of the Russian Empire. In collaboration with her husband, she translated several volumes of Leo Tolstoy's short stories, which were issued by a New York publishing house. She also revised translations that her husband made of some of Tolstoy's works and that of other Russian authors. During this marriage, she signed some of her works as "Ella Norraikow" and others, later, as "Countess Norraikow". (Note: Gerson (2011) refers to her as "the mysterious Countess Norraikow".) She worked on a book on "Nihilism and the Secret Police".

"When the unity of man, Nature, and God— our oneness with the Divine-is fully realized, all forms of weakness become impossible, and the individual resumes possession of his natural birthright-health." (Countess Norraikow, The Metaphysical Magazine, May 1897)

Her third marriage, on October 10, 1898, in Manhattan, was to John Emery McLean (1865-1935) of New York, formerly of Orangeville, Ontario, Canada. He was an old member of the Manhattan Single Tax Club and a former President and Chairman of the Board of Governors of the Canadian Club of that city. He also served as editor of Mind, The Arena, and The Metaphysical Magazine, all published in New York. The couple may have met through The Metaphysical Magazine or the journal's publisher, as Norraikow was by then a metaphysician. After this marriage, she signed her works as "Mrs. Ella N. McLean, the Countess Norraikow".

== Death ==
Following an accident, McLean died at the home of her daughter in Elizabeth, New Jersey on September 26, 1913.

== Selected works ==
- "Woman's Share in Russian Nihilism", by Ella Norraikow, The Cosmopolitan, August 1891, vol. 11, pp. 619-20 (text)
- "New-Year's in Russia", by The Countess Norraikow, Harper's Young People, December 29, 1891, vol. 13, no. 635, pp. 186-87 (text)
- "In the Don Cossacks' Lane; the homes of the fierce Russian warriors", by The Countess Norraikow, Youth's Companion, 1892, vol. 64 (text)
- Aristocracy; in 5 acts, dramatized by Countess Norraikow, by permission of D. Appleton & Co., New York, 1892 (text)
- "Nihilism and the Famine", by Countess Norraikow, Lippincott's Monthly Magazine, April 1892, vol. 49, pp. 463-71 (text)
- "Abolish Capital Punishment", by Countess Ella Norraikow, American Phrenological Journal and Life Illustrated, March 1895, pp. 150-52 (text)
- "The Folly of Suicide", by Countess Norraikow, Philosophical Journal, November 1895, vol. 18, no. 5, pp. 407-09 (text)
- "The 'Rutschbergs" of Russia', by Countess Norraikow, The Wide World, Ginn & Co., Boston, 1902, pp. 96-100 (text)
