= Sha-có-pay =

Painting of Plains Ojibwe chief by George Catlin

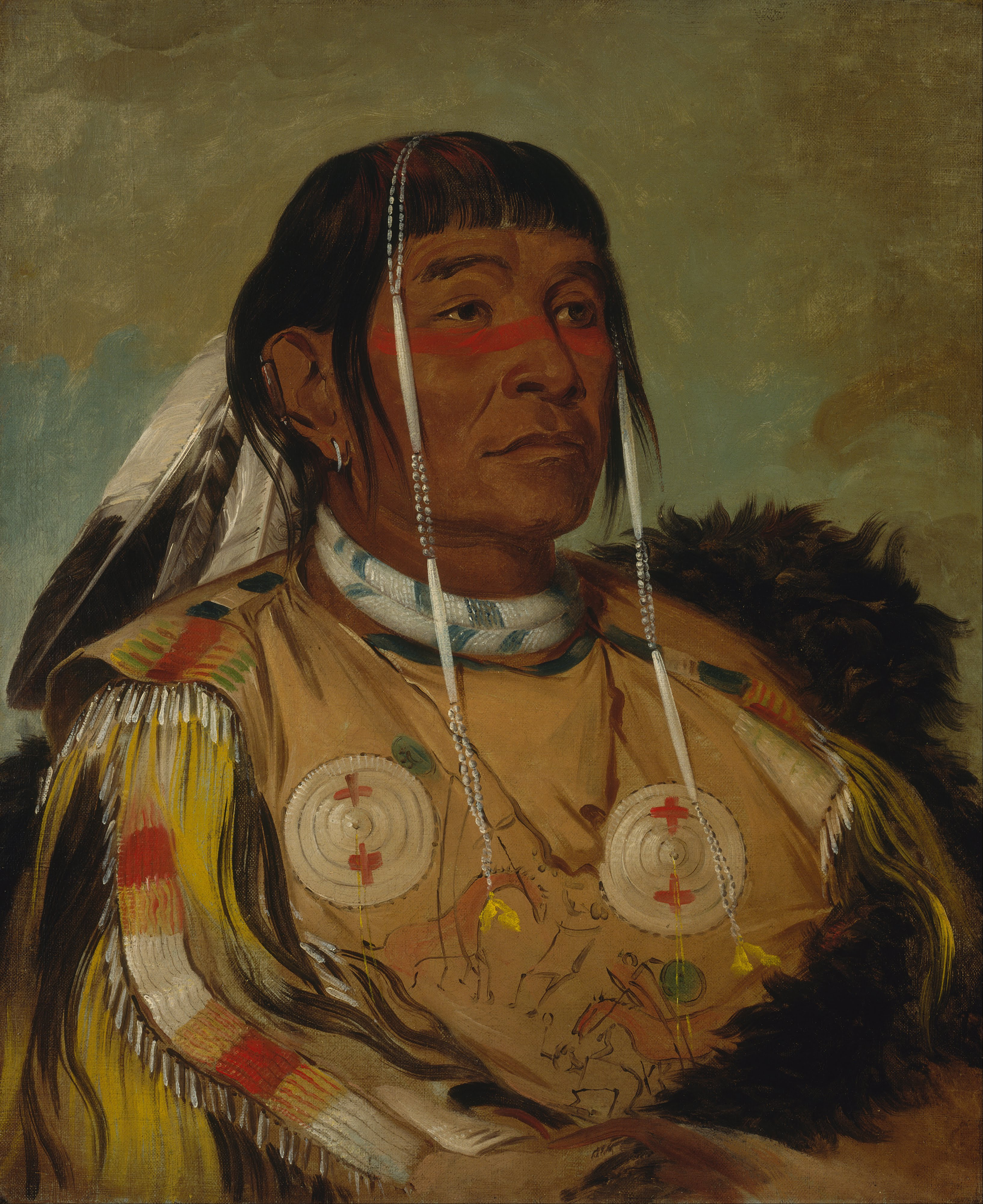
- Artist: George Catlin
- Year: 1832
- Medium: Oil on canvas
- Dimensions: 73.7 cm × 60.9 cm (29.0 in × 24.0 in)
- Location: Smithsonian American Art Museum; Washington, D.C.

Sha-có-pay is an oil-on-canvas painting from life by American artist George Catlin, from 1832. It depicts an Indigenous American named Sha-có-pay, who was chief of the Plains Ojibwe. It was painted at Fort Union.

Catlin traveled throughout Western North America and painted Indians at a time when the only contact with Whites was from explorers and traders. The painting shows traditional Plains Ojibwe clothing such as a beaded buckskin shirt, a buffalo-hide robe, eagle feathers, hair pipes, and a beaded necklace that is unique to the tribes of the northernmost plains (Ojibwe and Cree). The portrait was painted during a trip to Fort Union in 1832.

Catlin said:

The chief of that part of the Ojibbeway tribe who inhabit these northern regions … is a man of huge size; with dignity of manner, and pride and vanity, just about in proportion to his bulk. He sat for his portrait in a most beautiful dress, fringed with scalp locks in profusion; which he had snatched, in his early life from his enemies' heads, and now wears as proud trophies and proofs of what his arm has accomplished in battles with his enemies. His shirt of buckskin is beautifully embroidered and painted in curious hieroglyphics, the history of his battles and charts of his life.
