= Fort Buford Stage Road =

- U.S. National Register of Historic Places
- Location: Washburn, North Dakota
- NRHP reference No.: 100004540
- Added to NRHP: October 25, 2019

The Fort Buford Stage Road, in or near Washburn, North Dakota in McLean County, North Dakota was listed on the National Register of Historic Places in 2019.

It presumably went to Fort Buford, in the Dakota Territory.
