= Natawista Iksina =

Kainah interpreter and diplomat

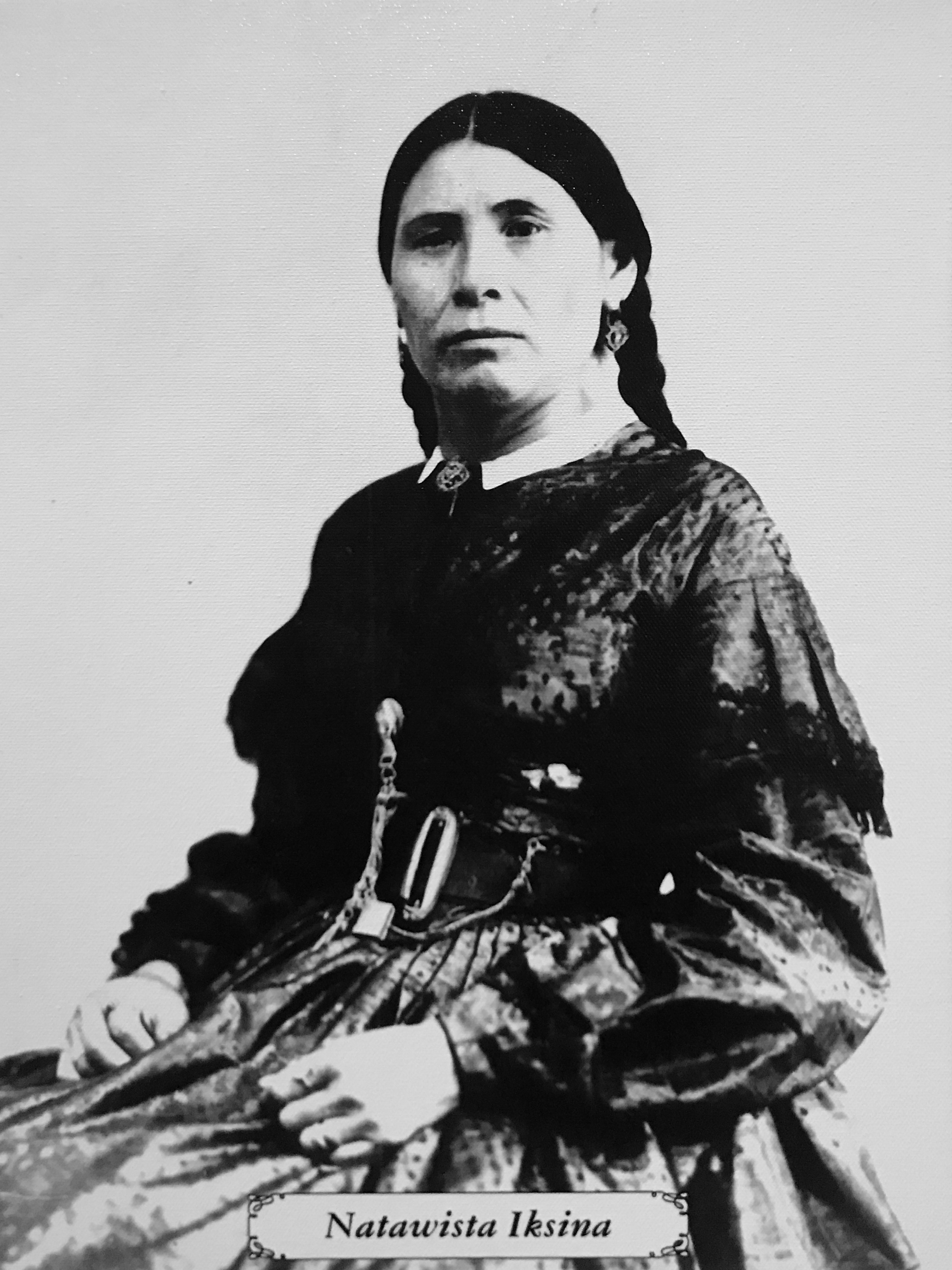
Portrait of Natawista Iksina

Natawista Iksina (born c. 1825, Alberta, Canada – died March 1893, Stand Off, Alberta, Canada), also spelled Natawista Iksana, Natoyist-Siksina', or Natúyi-tsíxina, was a Kainah interpreter and diplomat. Her father, Two Suns, was a Kainah leader. Her name was alternatively translated "Medicine Snake Woman" or "Holy Snake."

She was married to Alexander Culbertson, chief trader of Fort Union. Natawista and Culbertson were first married in Fort Union in 1840, when Natawista was 15 years old and Culbertson was 30 years old. They later participated in a Roman Catholic marriage ceremony in 1858 in Peoria, Illinois. The couple had five children.
