= Missouri-Yellowstone Confluence Interpretive Center =

Museum in North Dakota, United States

Coordinates: 47°59′06″N 103°59′20″W

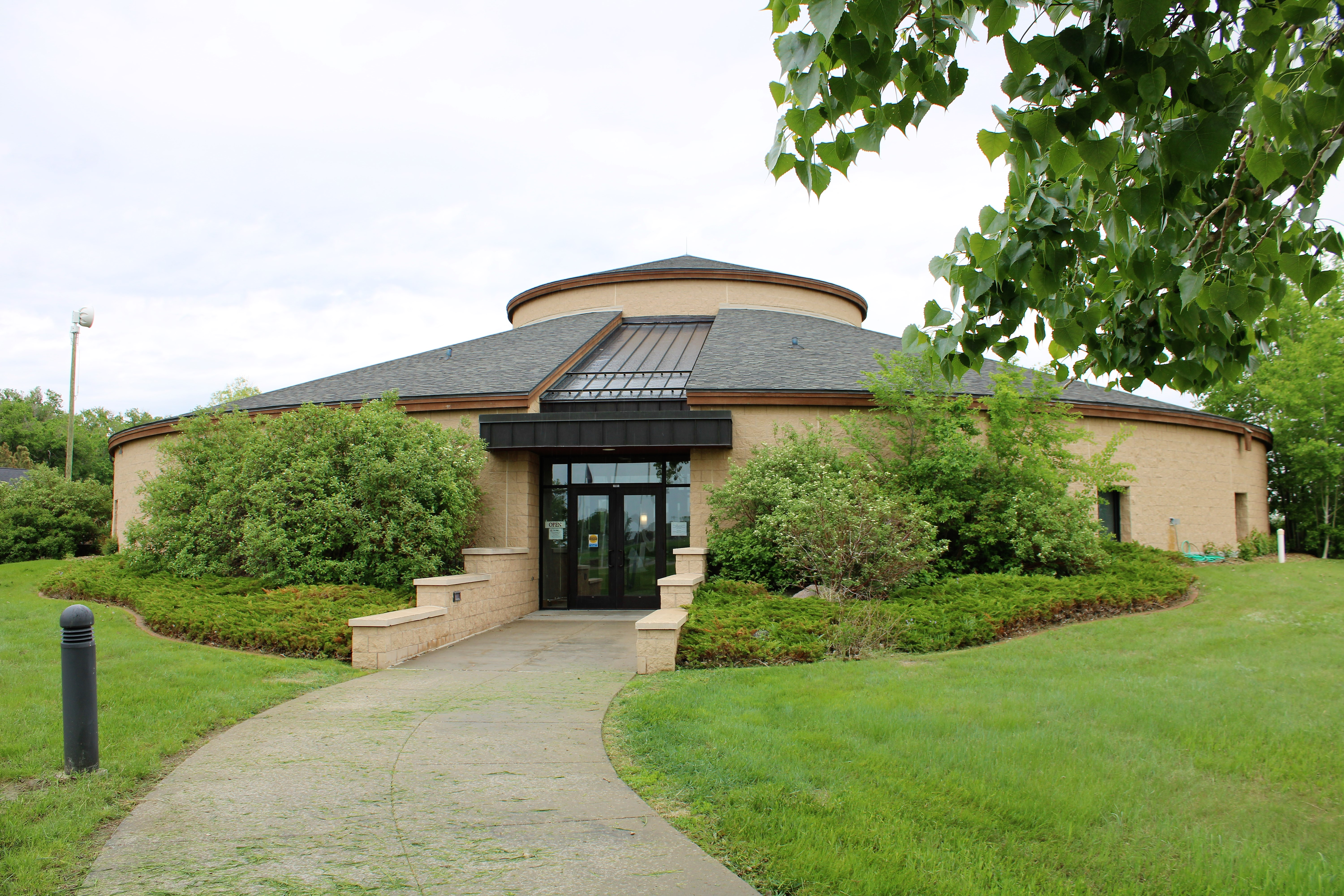
Missouri-Yellowstone Confluence Interpretive Center

The Missouri-Yellowstone Confluence Interpretive Center is a museum near Williston, North Dakota. It is dedicated to telling the story of the confluence of the Yellowstone and the Missouri Rivers in the western section of North Dakota near the Montana border. It features exhibits on the geography, geology, and history of the area. The interpretive center is located one-half mile east of historic Fort Buford near Williston, North Dakota. It also offers dramatic views of the Missouri and Yellowstone Rivers.

== Permanent exhibits ==
The center offers a 2,000 sq ft (190 m^{2}). gallery showcasing the history of the confluence. Featured exhibits are about the Corps of Discovery and their experiences in the area, Fort Buford, Fort Union and the fur-trade industry, and the development of transportation along the rivers.

== See also ==
- Fort Union Trading Post National Historic Site
- Fort Buford
