= Edwin Thompson Denig =

American fur trader and ethnographer (1812–1858)

- Denig and second wife
- Born: March 10, 1812; Stroudsburg, Pennsylvania, US
- Died: September 4, 1858 (aged 46); Red River Colony, Rupert's Land
- Resting place: Anglican Church Cemetery; Headingley, Manitoba
- Occupation: Fur trader
- Known for: Early ethnographer
- Spouse(s): Sina Wamniomi (Lakota); Hai-kees-kak-wee-yah (Assiniboine)

Edwin Thompson Denig (March 10, 1812 – September 4, 1858) was an American fur trader and pioneer ethnographer active at Fort Union, in present-day North Dakota.

== Fur trader ==
Denig was the son of a prosperous county doctor, yet he chose to dedicate his adult life to the fur trade. In 1833 he entered into the service of the American Fur Company as a clerk, first at Fort Pierre, and from 1837 at Fort Union. There he rose from bookkeeper to chief clerk, and finally Bourgeois (superintendent of the post and profit-sharing partner). At Fort Union Denig aided various visiting scholars, including John James Audubon, collected scientific specimens, and also collected diverse specimens for the Smithsonian Institution.

== Ethnographer ==
On the initiative of Father De Smet, Denig began in 1851 to write descriptions of Plains Indian culture that later was included in De Smets writings. Denig also assembled data for Henry Schoolcraft, later included in this scholar's writings. A later report by Denig on the Assiniboine was published in 1930 as Indian Tribes of the Missouri. A later manuscript lay dormant in the archives, until it was published in 1961 as Five Indian Tribes of the Upper Missouri.

== Personal life ==
Denig entered into several "country marriages" with Native American women. His first marriage was to Sina Wamniomi (Whirlwind Blanket), a Lakota, with whom he had a son, Robert, and a daughter, Sarah. His second marriage, in 1837, was with Hai-kees-kak-wee-yah (Deer Little Woman), an Assiniboine, with whom he had one son, Alexander, and two daughters, Ida and Adeline. The first wife stayed at Fort Pierre, but the son was with his father and the second wife at Fort Union. Denig also married the second wife's younger sister in a polygamous union, that eventually ended when the younger sister moved away. The marriage with the second wife was formalized in 1855 through a Catholic ceremony in St. Louis. In 1856 he moved with her and their three children to Selkirk Settlement, where the children were placed in Catholic schools. Denig was here active as an independent fur trader, but died of appendicitis in 1858.
