= The Metaphysical Magazine =

- Editor: John Emery McLean (managing editor 1895–97)
- Categories: metaphysical, occult
- Frequency: monthly (sometimes quarterly)
- Publisher: Metaphysical Publishing Company
- Founder: Leander Edmund Whipple
- Founded: 1895
- First issue: 1895
- Final issue: 1911
- Country: United States
- Based in: New York City
- Language: English

The Metaphysical Magazine was a late 19th and early 20th century American periodical devoted to occult and metaphysical matters. Intermittently it published under other names, including Intelligence, New Cycle, and Ideal Review.

== History ==
The Metaphysical Magazine: A Monthly Review of the Occult Sciences and Metaphysical Philosophy was founded in 1895 by Leander Edmund Whipple, a mental healer. It covered metaphysics, mental phenomena such as mental healing, Theosophy, astrology, and other occult subjects, with an emphasis on "the best and most reliable information." Contributors included the ornithologist and Theosophist Elliott Coues (who had the lead article in the magazine's first issue, discussing his telekinetic theory of levitation), the archaeologist Alice Dixon Le Plongeon, and the occultist author Florence Huntley.

It was issued monthly for the most part and ceased publication in 1911. For brief periods it was published under the following alternate titles: Intelligence (June 1897 – March 1898), New Cycle (January–March 1900), and Ideal Review (April–December 1900). Despite these title changes, it retained continuity in its volume numbering throughout its history.

The writer and editor John Emery McLean was the magazine's first managing editor, remaining in that position for over two years (1895–97).
