= Fort Buford =

- Fort Buford State Historic Site
- U.S. National Register of Historic Places
- U.S. Historic district
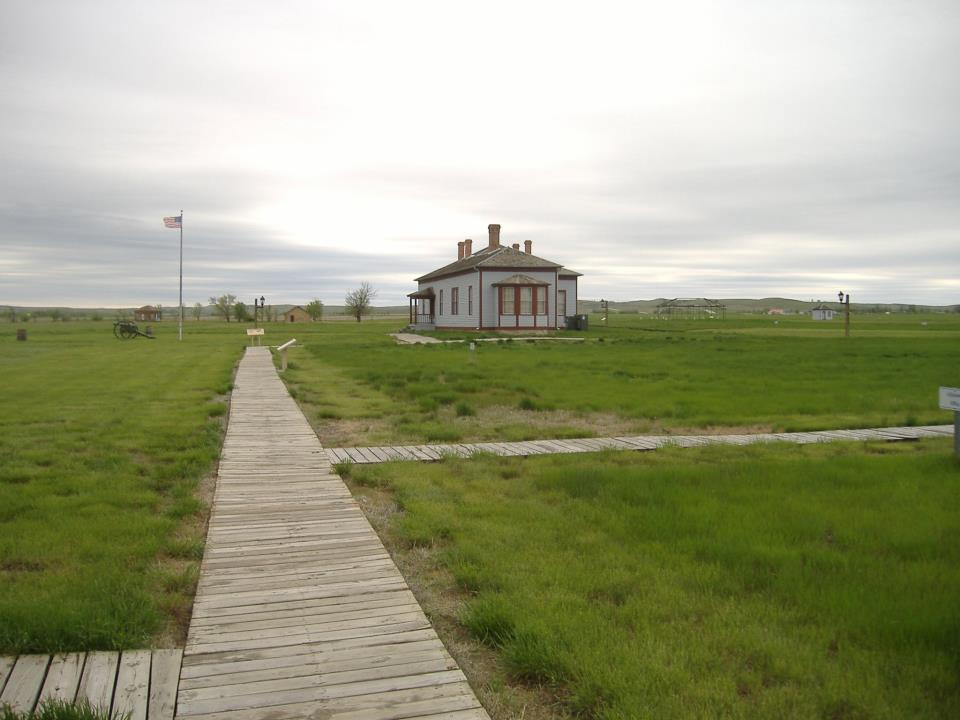
- Fort Buford's 1872 Commanding Officer's Quarters

- Location within North Dakota Location within the United States
- Location: Williams County, North Dakota, SW of Williston near the confluence of the Yellowstone and Missouri Rivers
- Nearest city: Williston, North Dakota
- Coordinates: 47°59′11″N 104°00′05″W
- Built: 1866
- NRHP reference No.: 75001308
- Added to NRHP: April 1, 1975

Fort Buford was a United States Army Post at the confluence of the Missouri and Yellowstone rivers in Dakota Territory, present day North Dakota, and the site of Sitting Bull's surrender in 1881.

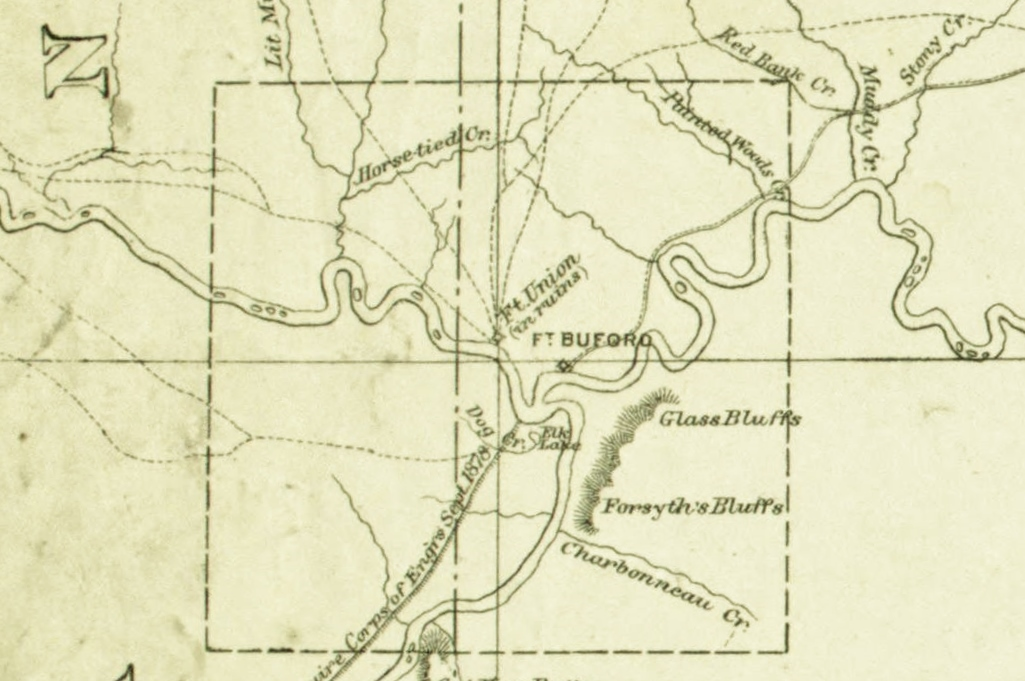
Detail of map "Dakota Territory", 1878, showing location of Fort Buford (ND) and Fort Buford Military Reservation, partly in North Dakota, partly in Montana

Company C, 2nd Battalion, 13th Infantry, 3 officers, 80 enlisted men and 6 civilians commanded by Capt. (Brevet Lt. Col.) William G. Rankin, first established a camp on the site on June 15, 1866, with orders to build a post, the majority of which was built using adobe and cottonwood enclosed by a wooden stockade. The fort was named after the late Major General John Buford, a Union Army cavalry general during the American Civil War.

== Lakota attacks ==
The second night after arrival the camp was attacked by a band of the Hunkpapa Lakota led by Sitting Bull, they were driven off with one soldier wounded. The next day, the same group attacked and attempted to drive off the company's herd of beef cattle, but were repulsed and two Lakota killed. Parties of men cutting and rafting logs from the mouth of the Yellowstone were often attacked and driven to camp, where the fighting often lasted from two to six hours with losses on both sides.

=== Hard winter ===
Three civilian wood cutters were killed at the mouth of the Yellowstone in December. Lieut. Hiram H. Ketchum with sixty men reacted, drove off the Indians and recovered the bodies with slight loss to his detachment. According to the regimental history, the Lakota boasted that they intended to annihilate the soldiers and during the winter they besieged the post. The siege cut off the garrison from the nearby Missouri River and forced them to sink shallow wells near their quarters in order to obtain fresh water. The shallow well water they drank was contaminated, by the post's livestock and/or human waste, and caused dysentery. From December 21–24 a large group of the Hunkpapas repeatedly attacked and captured the post's ice house and sawmill located near the river and opened fire on the post. The attackers were not repelled until Rankin ordered his two 12 pound Napoleons to return fire. Captain Rankin's wife spent the winter in camp, enduring the hardships and dangers with the troops in garrison.

=== Massacre hoax ===
The harassing raids and resulting lack of communication from the isolated post led to the perpetration of a hoax, the "Fort Buford Massacre", purporting that the fort had been wiped out, Capt. Rankin captured and tortured to death, and Rankin's wife captured and abused. The episode began when the Philadelphia Inquirer ran a story April 1, 1867, based on a letter allegedly written from the fort, which was then picked up and run the next day nationwide. It was given "legs" by a letter published April 6 in the Army and Navy Journal, attributed to the wife of a prominent Army officer, confirming the massacre. Although by April 4 many newspapers had begun to question the validity of the report, The Chicago Daily Times, Detroit Free Press, New York Daily Tribune, The New York Times, and Boston Herald, among others, continued to feed the rumors with further stories for another month, many of them accusing the Army and the Johnson Administration of covering up the massacre. The hoax was eventually exposed by Rankin himself in correspondence to the war department.

Although the general harassing by the Lakota of Fort Buford lasted until the early 1870s, the worst was during that first year, June 1866 to May 1867. In May, the Missouri River thawed allowing the sternwheeler steamboat Graham to reinforce the garrison with additional riverboats arriving in June carrying Companies B, F, G, and part of E thereby enabling the garrison to better defend itself and allow for more permanent structures to be built.

== Construction phases ==
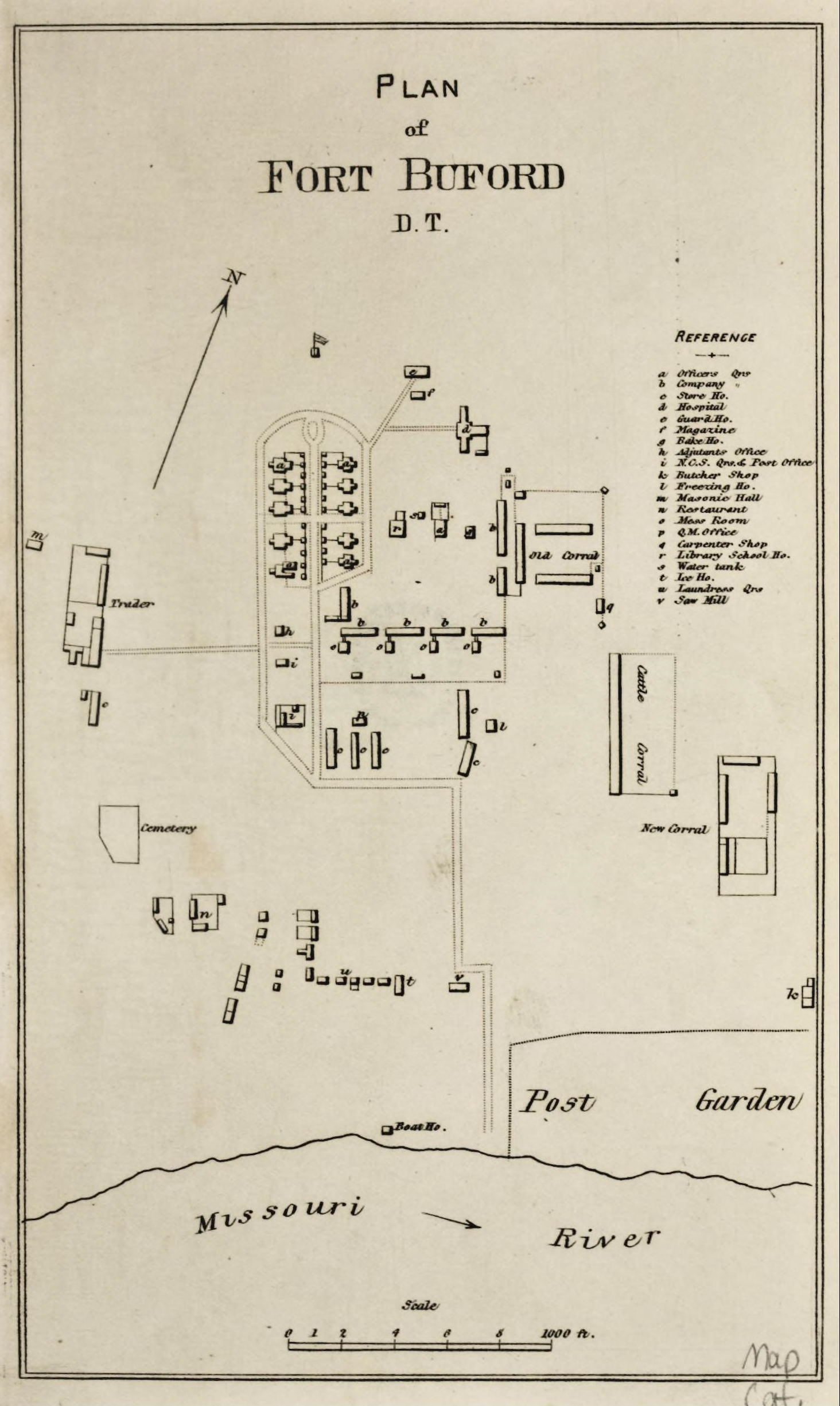
Plan of Fort Buford

With the arrival of Companies B, F, G, and E, Fort Buford was expanded in 1867–1868 from the original 1866 one-company 360-foot square frontier stockade to a 540 x 1,080 feet 5 company fort with only three walls towards the West, North, and East. The South side, while not being walled off, was enclosed by the long portion of a reverse "L" of adobe barracks buildings and the Missouri River towards the South served as a natural moat. The reconstructed barracks on the site today is on the location of where the original that formed the short leg of the "L" was. In 1867, old Fort Union, A fur trading post dating back to 1829 and located 2 miles away by land, 7 by river, was bought by the Army and parts of it were demolished and used at Fort Buford during this construction phase. The reason being that the wood there had 30 years worth of age and was of superior quality to the green cottonwood available along the Yellowstone and Missouri Rivers where the only native wood grew.

The post was expanded again in 1871–1872 with the arrival of Colonel William B. Hazen's 6th Infantry Regiment to a six-company infantry post covering approximately a square mile, including laundress' quarters and other civilian areas, using lumber shipped from the Eastern United States by steamboat but with no stockade. At that time the fighting had moved further westward into Montana Territory and the garrison was large enough to no-longer need the perimeter stockade. The original Commanding Officer's Quarters at the site today was part of this expansion and originally built in 1871–1872 and served as Hazen's residence from 1872–1880. This structure sits at the southern end of what once was a double row of Officer's Quarters that ran towards the North. Beyond this double row the stone Powder Magazine was built in 1875 out of sandstone quarried from an area located to the North of the fort. When in use the magazine held over a million rounds of ammunition for the fort's garrison, much of it being black powder cartridges one of which was the .45-70. At this time Fort Buford became a key element in the supply route for the military campaigns of 1876–1877 in Montana Territory. At the peak of occupation, which followed the Battle of the Little Bighorn in 1876 until 1881, there were just under 100 buildings and approximately 1,000 people occupying the post at any given moment including infantry and cavalry companies bivouacking in tents on the parade ground while being resupplied.

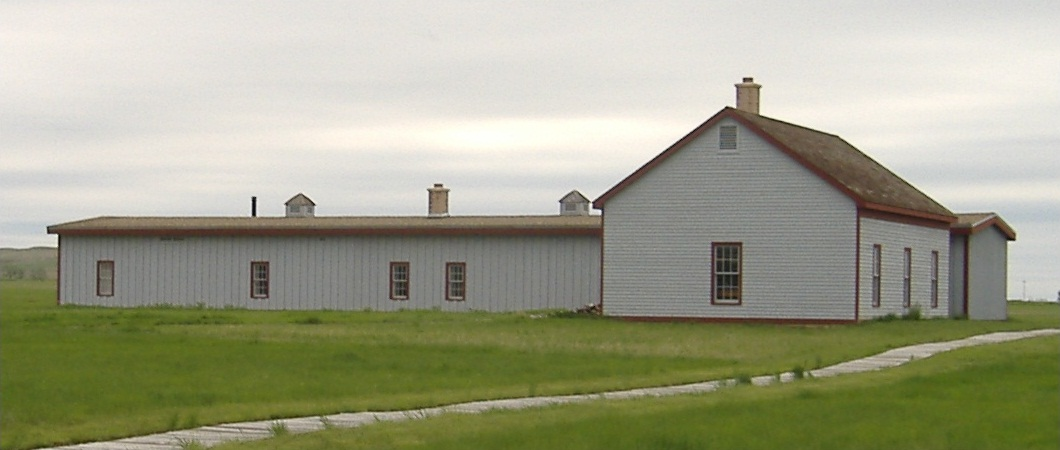
Reconstructed barracks resembling how the original structure would have looked in 1876. The long portion was originally built of adobe while the attached kitchen and mess hall was built using pole building framing.

Following the 1871–1872 expansion there were several improvements to the fort. In 1873–1874 the 6 adobe barracks from the 1867–1868 expansion were rehabilitated in order to stabilize their crumbling adobe, this was done by adding wood sheathing to the outside of the building protecting it from the weather as well as plastering the interior and replacing the sod roof with a new lighter roof covered with tar and gravel. At the same time, the kitchen and mess hall for each barracks was relocated from the main building to a new addition connected by a short hallway. This new addition was built using the same quality lumber from the Eastern States as used in the other buildings of the 1871–1872 expansion, the existing reconstruction represents what the original building would have looked like in 1876. By 1880 however, all of the remaining adobe barracks buildings were collapsing, with a few having already collapsed and forcing the men to bivouac in tents on the parade ground. By 1881, the adobe structures were torn down and replaced with wooden structures relocated to the eastern side of the parade ground. In 1883, the Commanding Officer's Quarters' bay window was pushed out to the South adding on two rooms to the structure.

In 1889, the last of the expansions took place. A much larger Commanding officer's Quarters was built on the northern end of Officer's Row replacing the 1872 Hazen Quarters which then became the Field Officer's Quarters. A water tower was built towards the river and attempts were made at installing water mains to the structures. The attempt failed however, because they could not bury the pipes deep enough to keep them from freezing every Winter with the last attempt at 8 feet.

The remoteness of the post, poor quality of its original construction, and age resulted in the fort's deterioration with many of the original adobe and cottonwood structures constantly in a state of collapse due to unskilled labor, the elements, and poor construction methods when built.

== Indian village ==
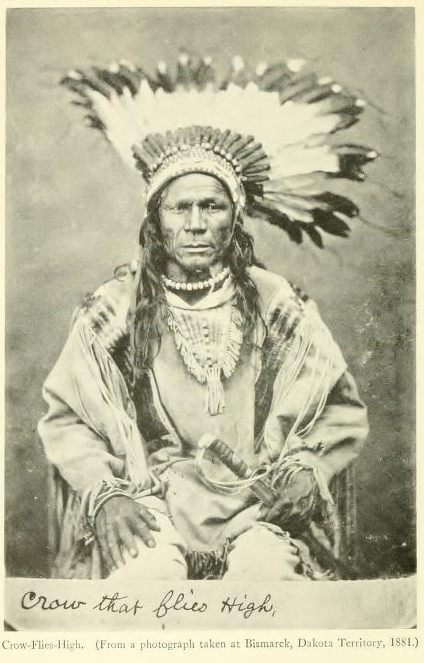
Hidatsa chief and rebel Crow Flies High. He and his followers built a new village just two miles from Fort Buford. It seems, they felt the village was more safe from attacks by the Sioux, if they built it close to a military fort

Around 1870, the garrison received unexpected newcomers. They were Hidatsa and Mandan Indians from the joint settlement Like-a-Fishhook Village nearly 100 miles further downstream in the Fort Berthold Indian Reservation. From 150 to 200 migrants, led by Bobtail Bull and Crow Flies High, founded a new settlement of mainly log cabins some two miles northwest of the fort. The Indian rebels were in conflict with the old village chiefs. Further, they fled the newly introduced reservation system.

Since the Hidatsas never had taken up arms against the U.S. Army, they were accepted in the area. Moreover, they were enemies of the Sioux. The very grounds for the separatists to settle this close to the military fort "was the greater protection from the Sioux" it offered to a small village. The garrison recognized the military value of its new neighbors and enlisted some as scouts to a regular pay.

Once in the 1880s, the scouts and the soldiers went to Bismarck, expecting problems with some reservation Sioux which never emerged. In peacetime, the Hidatsas carried military mail to places like Poplar and Glendive, Montana. The Indian village in the Military Reservation lasted until 1884. Commanding officer J.N.G. Whistler closed the settlement due to a growing number of inhabitants, instances of prostitution and some begging at the fort.

== Decommissioning and the site as it is today ==
Due to the settlement of the region and the poor condition of the post, Fort Buford was decommissioned by the Army on October 1, 1895. In 1896, all of the remaining structures were sold at auction to be either hauled away or torn down. All but 3 were moved: the 1872 Commanding Officer's Quarters where Sitting Bull surrendered his rifle, the 1875 stone Powder Magazine, and a Duplex Officer's Quarters. The Duplex was used as a residence and the much smaller Commanding Officer's Quarters was used as a guest house and later as a granary by the Mercer family and the grounds were called "Villa Militare" until the grounds were given to the State of North Dakota in 1927. The Duplex burned down destroying with it many artifacts in 1937. In the 1990s the former Officer of the Guard/Officer of the Day building was found being used as a pump house for the nearby irrigation canal and was relocated to its original location. In 2004, an example of an adobe barracks was built at the location of an original barracks that was there from 1867 to 1881. From archaeological findings at the site prior to its construction, it was determined that this particular barracks held Co. G 6th Infantry Regiment while the 6th Infantry was stationed at the post from 1871 to 1880. Of the approximately 1 square mile sized fort only 40 acres is currently owned by the state of North Dakota. Today the North Dakota State Historical Society runs Fort Buford as Fort Buford State Historic Site.

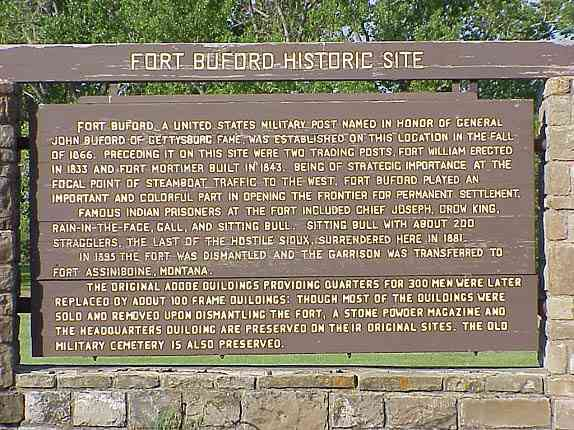
Fort Buford marker, North Dakota, 2003

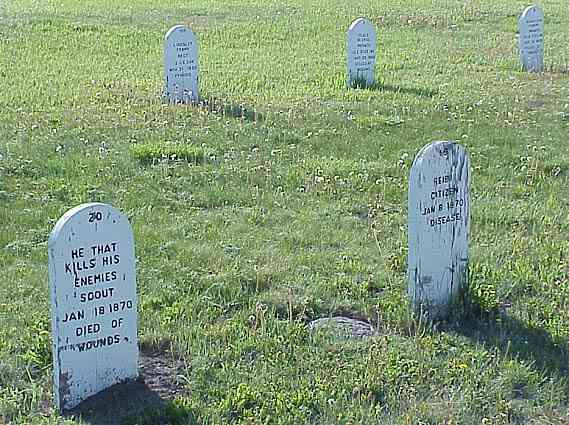
"From a marker in the Fort Buford (North Dakota) cemetery: 'He That Kills His Enemies' – Indian Scout – January 18, 1870 – Died of Wounds … in a quarrel with a fellow scout on the 5th inst. received a penetrating [arrow] wound of the pelvis and abdomen. … Death occurred [sic] January 18, 1870. An autopsy could not be obtained owing to the feelings of the relatives." – Konstantin, P., This day in North American Indian history, p. 17. (quoted with author's permission)

== See also ==
- Fort Buford Stage Road, also National Register-listed
- Fort Union Trading Post National Historic Site, nearby site that predates Fort Buford.
- Missouri-Yellowstone Confluence Interpretive Center
- Fort Dilts State Historic Site
- Fort Abraham Lincoln State Park
