= Kenneth McKenzie (fur trader) =

Scottish-Canadian fur trader (1797–1861)

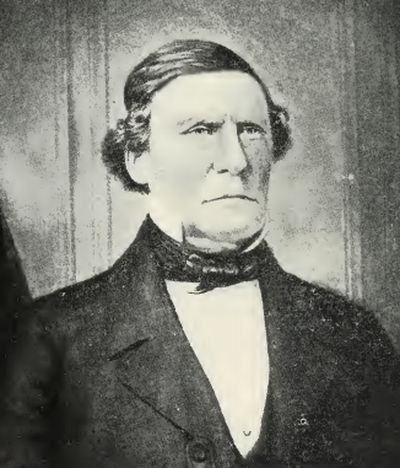
Kenneth Mckenzie

Kenneth McKenzie (sometimes rendered Kenneth MacKenzie; 1797 – 26 April 1861) was nicknamed the "King of the Missouri", for as a fur trader for American Fur Company in the upper Missouri River valley, he controlled a territory larger than most European nations.

== Background ==
McKenzie was a Scot by birth, a Canadian immigrant as a teenager. He became a clerk for the North West Company, learning the fur business. Losing his job when his employer was merged into the Hudson's Bay Company, McKenzie traveled to St. Louis in 1822, applied for US citizenship and joined the Columbia Fur Company, heading it by the mid-1820s. While he was at Fort Union he married an Indian woman but later in his life he married a woman named Marry Marshal.

== Career ==
American Fur spent years negotiating, and finally met McKenzie's demands in 1827 to buy Columbia Fur. It was renamed the "Upper Missouri Outfit" division of American Fur, and in 1828, McKenzie went up the river to lead the fur trade, building Fort Union near the confluence of the Missouri and Yellowstone Rivers.

Fort Union was ideally situated to dominate the final years of the beaver pelt trade and the beginning of the buffalo hide trade, and many tribes dealt with McKenzie.

In 1831, McKenzie succeeded in beginning trade with the native Piegan Blackfeet, eventually building Fort McKenzie in their territory as another trading post.

In 1832, 1833, and 1834, Congress passed increasingly restrictive laws to keep alcohol out of the hands of Indians. American Fur was the company most affected by these laws, and they lobbied heavily against it. Alcohol was inexpensive, easy to transport, and something Indians would always trade for.

The company's primary means of transporting furs from and trade goods to their trading posts was by steamboat, and these boats could be inspected at Fort Osage. In order to avoid losing out to foreign traders, McKenzie had the parts shipped to him in 1833 to build a distillery at Fort Union.

Since it was illegal to sell alcohol to Indians, they would give away watered-down whiskey, doctored with tobacco, pepper, molasses, and anything else that would give it a kick, one day, and the next, when they were to commence trading, they would give them a non-alcoholic version.

In August, 1833, a proud McKenzie showed off his still to M. S. Cerré and Nathaniel J. Wyeth. They were outraged at the prices McKenzie was charging for his goods - and the fact that he wouldn't sell them any liquor for their own trade. When the two reached Fort Leavenworth, they reported the still. On June 30, 1834, Congress prohibited distilleries in Indian territory - a law that is still on the books today, although most laws against selling liquor to Indians were repealed in 1948.

The distillery at Fort Union effectively ended the career of the American Fur Company's best field trader, Kenneth McKenzie; he was fired. In 1834, John Jacob Astor retired, and sold the western division of American Fur to Pierre Chouteau, Jr., who had been Astor's St. Louis agent since 1827.

== Later life ==
McKenzie married a woman named Mary. They had a son (Kenneth Jr.) and two daughters, including Mary. His son Kenneth McKenzie Jr. died on November 7, 1847.

He also had a son named Owen with an Indian wife.

McKenzie retired with $50,000. He spent his later years as a farmer in St. Louis County on a 3,000 acres he had bought from Gregoire Sarpy in what later became Affton, Missouri. The road that ran through his property was known as Mackenzie Road and still bears his name today.

In 1842 he had his land surveyed, divided into forty acre tracts and put up for sale. Louis Auguste Benoist began acquiring parts of the Mackenzie Tract in 1850 for farms and a country home, calling it Oakland Farms. Other parcels would change hands multiple times before becoming subdivisions, cemeteries, and Kenrick-Glennon Seminary.

McKenzie died on April 26, 1861, and was buried at Bellefontaine Cemetery in St. Louis.

== See also ==
- Fort Union Trading Post National Historic Site
- Joseph LaBarge — captain of steamboats used in McKenzie's service
- York (explorer)

== Sources ==
- Chittenden, Hiram Martin (1902). The American fur trade of the far West, Volume I. New York : Francis P. Harper.
