= Fort Union Trading Post National Historic Site =

National Historic Site of the United States in North Dakota

- U.S. National Register of Historic Places
- U.S. National Historic Landmark
- U.S. National Historic Site
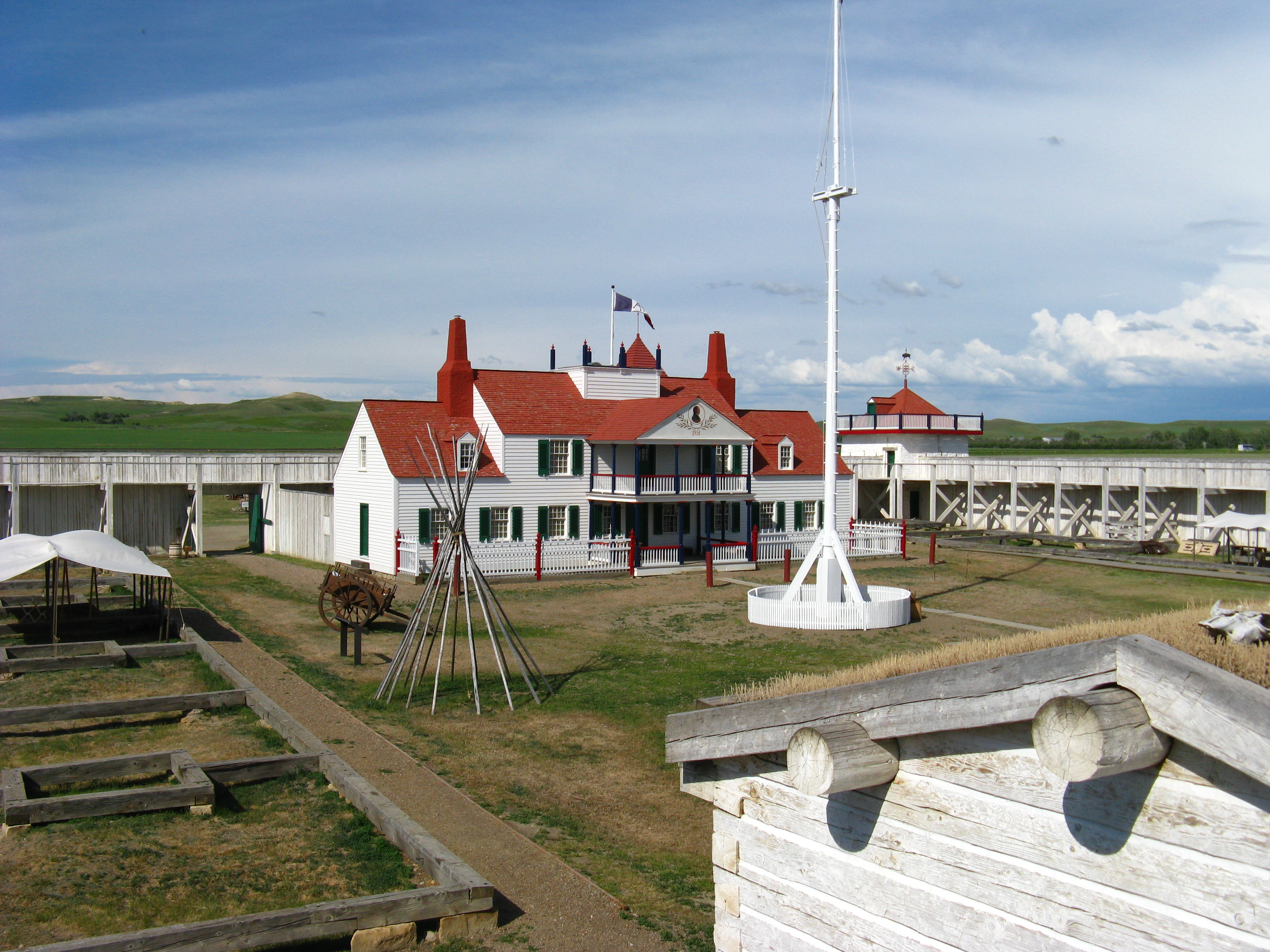
- View inside Fort Union from the Southwest bastion looking towards the Bourgeois (manager's) house.

- Location within North Dakota Location within the United States
- Location: McKenzie and Williams counties, North Dakota, and Richland and Roosevelt counties, Montana
- Nearest city: Williston, North Dakota
- Coordinates: 47°59′58″N 104°2′26″W
- Area: 444 acres (1.80 km^{2})
- Built: 1828
- Architectural style: Greek Revival
- Visitation: 12,028 (2024)
- Website: Fort Union Trading Post National Historic Site
- NRHP reference No.: 66000103 (original); 100011805 (increase 1); 100011806 (increase 2)

Significant dates
- Added to NRHP: October 15, 1966
- Boundary increases: May 9, 2025; May 9, 2025
- Designated NHL: July 4, 1961
- Designated NHS: June 20, 1966

Fort Union Trading Post National Historic Site is a partial reconstruction of the most important fur trading post on the upper Missouri River from 1829 to 1867. The fort site is about two miles from the confluence of the Missouri River and its tributary, the Yellowstone River, on the Dakota side of the North Dakota/Montana border, 25 miles from Williston, North Dakota.

In 1961, the site was designated by the Department of Interior as one of the earliest declared National Historic Landmarks in the United States. The National Park Service formally named it as Fort Union Trading Post to differentiate it from Fort Union National Monument, a historic frontier Army post in New Mexico.

The historic site interprets how portions of the fort may have looked in 1851, based on archaeological excavations and contemporary drawings. Among the sources were drawings by Swiss artist Rudolf Kurz, who worked as the post clerk in 1851.

== History ==
Fort Union, possibly first known as Fort Henry or Fort Floyd, was built in 1828 or 1829 by the Upper Missouri Outfit managed by Kenneth McKenzie; it was capitalized by John Jacob Astor's American Fur Company, Astor having created a virtual monopoly in fur trading.

During the 1830s and '40s, the fort was at the center of the fur trade between the Upper Missouri and St. Louis. Significant amounts of local timber were used to build living quarters at the fort and to fuel steamboats.

Until 1867, Fort Union was the central, and busiest, trading post on the upper Missouri, instrumental in developing the fur trade in Montana. Here Assiniboine, Crow, Cree, Ojibwe, Blackfoot, Hidatsa, Lakota, and other tribes traded buffalo robes and furs for trade goods. There was a market in manufactured beads, clay pipes, guns, blankets, knives, cookware, cloth, and alcohol. Historic visitors to the fort included John James Audubon, Sha-có-pay, Captain Joseph LaBarge, Kenneth McKenzie, Jesuit missionary Father Pierre-Jean De Smet, artist George Catlin, Sitting Bull, Karl Bodmer, Hugh Glass, and trader Jim Bridger.

Federal soldiers dismantled the fort and used its logs to build Fort Buford.

At first, Indians traded beaver pelts for Euro-American goods because there was demand for beaver hats in the East and in Europe. During the 1830s, silk and woolen hats became more popular and demand for beaver pelts decreased. The trade shifted to bison robes.

During the historical period, Fort Union served as a haven for many frontier people and contributed to economic growth on the American northwestern frontier. As headquarters for the American Fur Company, it played a primary role in the growth of the fur trade. Fur trade entrepreneurs, such as Astor and successors, exerted considerable influence on government policies that affected the Indian nations of the region. The presence of the fort near the northern border of the United States also symbolized national sovereignty in the region.

The fort maintained a large inventory of firearms that were traded with Indian tribes for furs. In turn, Indians used the firearms in hunting for furs and buffalo robes. Northern Plains Indians preferred the English-made "North West Gun," a smooth-bore flintlock, because of its reputation for quality and reliability.

Conflicts between Euro-American traders and Indians were less frequent around Fort Union than were conflicts among the Indian tribes themselves. However, during the summer of 1863, following the Dakota War of 1862, many tribes along the upper Missouri River became openly hostile to whites. At times Fort Union was nearly under siege, and the steamboats and their passengers were exposed to significant danger along the river.

In May 2025, an armed individual barricaded himself inside Fort Union Trading Post National Historic Site, prompting a law enforcement response. The individual confronted a park employee at the entrance while armed with a fire poker and escorted them off the property. Damage to park structures was discovered, including a broken lock and a missing donation box. The suspect was later observed inside the fort, armed with firearms, and claimed to have ample supplies to remain barricaded within the site. He also threatened to burn down the fort and destroy historical artifacts. Later in the day, a SWAT team and negotiators successfully secured the individual's surrender. The incident marked a rare instance in recent history in which a historic fort was unlawfully occupied and temporarily taken control of by an armed individual.

== See also ==
- Fort Buford, nearby site
- Missouri-Yellowstone Confluence Interpretive Center
- Fur trade in Montana
- List of National Historic Landmarks in Montana
- National Register of Historic Places listings in Roosevelt County, Montana
- List of National Historic Landmarks in North Dakota
- National Register of Historic Places listings in Richland County, North Dakota

== Bibliography ==
- Barbour, Barton H. (2001). Fort Union and the Upper Missouri Fur Trade. University of Oklahoma Press. ISBN 978-0-8061-3295-2.
- Chittenden, Hiram Martin (1903). History of early steamboat navigation on the Missouri River : life and adventures of Joseph La Barge, Volume I . New York : Francis P. Harper.
- —— (1903). History of early steamboat navigation on the Missouri River : life and adventures of Joseph La Barge, Volume II . New York : Francis P. Harper.
- —— (1902). The American fur trade of the far West, Volume I. New York : Francis P. Harper.
- ——; de Smet, Pierre-Jean; Richardson, Alfred Talbot (1905). Life, letters and travels of Father Pierre-Jean de Smet, S.J., 1801-1873, Volume I. New York : Francis P. Harper.
- Chittenden, Hiram Martin; de Smet, Pierre-Jean; Richardson, Alfred Talbot (1905). Life, letters and travels of Father Pierre-Jean de Smet, S.J., 1801-1873, Volume II. New York : Francis P. Harper.
- De Vore, Steven Leroy (1992). Beads of the Bison Robe Trade: The Fort Union Trading Post Collection. Friends of Fort Union Trading Post.
- —— (1990). "Fur Trade Era Blacksmith Shops at Fort Union Trading Post National Historic Site, North Dakota". Historical Archaeology. 24 (23). Springer: 23. JSTOR 25615792.
- Matzko, John Austin (2001). Reconstructing Fort Union. University of Nebraska Press. ISBN 978-0-8032-3216-7.
- Ross, Lester A. (2000). Trade Beads from Archeological Excavations at Fort Union Trading Post National Historic Site. National Park Service, Midwest Archeological Center.

=== Online sources ===
- "Firearms of Fort Union - The Flint and Fire of Fort Union: Firearms of the Fur Trade". National park Service. 2015.
- MacVaugh, Fred (2017). "Conflict at the Confluence: Catlin's Eyewitness Account". National park Service.
- Smith, Eduardo (2025). "Fort Union Trading Post National Historic Site Where to stay". In collaboration with National park Service.
