= Cerullo =

Cerullo is a surname. Notable people with the surname include:

- Alfred C. Cerullo III (born 1961), American commissioner of New York City Department of Consumer Affairs
- Ben Cerullo (born 1976), American evangelist, Christian television show host and producer
- David Cerullo (born 1952), American Pentecostal minister
- Isadora Cerullo (born 1991), American-Brazil rugby player
- Jonathan Cerullo (born 1960), American director and choreographer, executive producer, and former performer
- Leonard J. Cerullo (born 1944), American neurosurgeon
- Morris Cerullo (1931–2020), American Pentecostal televangelist

== See also ==
- Lois Cerullo, character in the television series General Hospital
- Lila Cerullo, character in Elena Ferrante’s Neapolitan Novels
