= Into the Wild Frontier =

American docudrama TV series

- Genre: History; Western; Drama
- Inspired by: Numerous
- Directed by: Paul Epstein (10 episodes); Jason Sklaver (8 episodes); Christopher Cassel (6 episodes)
- Narrated by: Delbert Hunt
- No. of seasons: 4
- No. of episodes: 31

Production
- Executive producers: Craig Miller; Dale Ardizzone; David Cerullo; Doug Butts; Gary Tarpinian; Paninee Theeranuntawat
- Running time: 22 minutes

Original release
- Network: INSP
- Release: February 17, 2022 – present

Into the Wild Frontier is an American docudrama TV series, which airs on INSP and streaming platforms. Each episode follows a different person from the historical era of the American Frontier.

There are currently 4 seasons of the show and it first aired in February 2022. A fourth season aired in Spring 2024.

== Background ==
Into the Wild Frontier dramatizes real life events and people from the American Frontier era. Each episode focuses on a different notable character from history, with some of America's best known explorers and frontiersmen depicted on the show.

The first episode of Into the Wild Frontier aired in February 2022, following the life of John Colter. The second season aired in February 2023, with the third-season premiere airing only a month after the second season had finished in May 2023.

The shows third season follows a number of new frontiersmen. It included William Sublette, who with the Rocky Mountain Fur Company played a major role in the development of the Oregon Trail. In August 2023, the network gave the fourth season the green light, with production expected to start before the end of the year.

Following the completion of its production, the fourth season of into The Wild Frontier aired in Spring 2024. The season consisted of seven standalone episodes, continuing with its theme from other seasons of following a different individual from the American Frontier. Some new historical characters are portrayed on the season, such as John Coffee Hays and Lucien Maxwell, and others return to continue telling the story of their life including Joe Meek.

== Episodes ==
| Season | Episodes | Originally released | |
| Season | Episodes | First released | Last released |
|---|---|---|---|
| 1 | 8 | February 17, 2022 | April 7, 2022 |
| 2 | 8 | February 15, 2023 | April 5, 2023 |
| 3 | 8 | May 6, 2023 | June 24, 2023 |
| 4 | 7 | March 24, 2024 | May 5, 2024 |

=== Season 1 (2022) ===
| No. overall | No. in season | Title | Original release date |
|---|---|---|---|
| 1 | 1 | "John Colter: King of the Mountain Men" | February 17, 2022 |
John Colter, one of America's first mountain men, survives multiple brushes with death, including a harrowing escape from Blackfeet warriors who strip him naked and force him to run for his life.
| 2 | 2 | "Jim Bridger: Forged on the Frontier" | February 24, 2022 |
Young Jim Bridger faces the harsh realities of the frontier, including a moral dilemma where he must decide between staying with a dying companion or fleeing to save his own life from approaching Arikara warriors.
| 3 | 3 | "Jim Beckwourth: War Chief of the Crow" | March 3, 2022 |
Former slave Jim Beckwourth heads West to work as a trapper and eventually rises to become a respected war chief of the Crow tribe, showcasing his adaptability and leadership.
| 4 | 4 | "Lewis & Clark: Captains of Discovery" | March 10, 2022 |
Meriwether Lewis and William Clark embark on their famous expedition to explore the uncharted American West, navigating treacherous terrain and fostering relationships with Native American tribes.
| 5 | 5 | "Kit Carson: The Greatest Scout in the West" | March 17, 2022 |
Kit Carson becomes renowned for his scouting abilities, guiding expeditions through the rugged western terrain and playing a crucial role in American expansion.
| 6 | 6 | "Tom Fitzpatrick: Trapper, Trader, Legend" | March 24, 2022 |
Tom Fitzpatrick's adventures as a trapper and trader are highlighted, demonstrating his skills in navigating and surviving the perilous frontier life while building trade networks.
| 7 | 7 | "Daniel Boone: Hero of Kentucky" | March 31, 2022 |
Daniel Boone leads settlers to Kentucky, but his leadership is tested when his daughter is abducted by a Cherokee chief, prompting him to transition from a settler to a warrior to rescue her.
| 8 | 8 | "Jedediah Smith: Scholar and Survivor" | April 7, 2022 |
Jedediah Smith's journey as an explorer and cartographer is chronicled, emphasizing his scholarly approach to mapping the West and his survival skills in the face of numerous dangers.

=== Season 2 (2023) ===
| No. overall | No. in season | Title | Original release date |
|---|---|---|---|
| 9 | 1 | "Kit Carson: Fearless Fighter" | February 15, 2023 |
Kit Carson's reputation as a fearless frontiersman is cemented when he confronts a notorious mountain bully in a deadly duel, showcasing his bravery and fighting skills.
| 10 | 2 | "Joe Meek: Cunning Captive" | February 22, 2023 |
Teenaged Joe Meek arrives as a greenhorn trapper but evolves into one of the most cunning mountain men, navigating the challenges of the wild and the complex relationships with Native Americans.
| 11 | 3 | "Andrew Henry: Man of His Word" | March 1, 2023 |
Andrew Henry, despite his limited experience in the fur trade, commits to leading a trapping expedition into the dangerous Western territories. Partnered with the volatile Manuel Lisa, Henry faces internal discord and the constant threat from the Blackfeet tribe.
| 12 | 4 | "Marie Dorion: Enduring Frontier Legend" | March 8, 2023 |
In the episode "Marie Dorion: Enduring Frontier Legend," Marie Dorion, a resilient Iowa woman, joins the Astor Expedition as the only female member, demonstrating remarkable survival skills and tenacity. After her husband is killed by hostile tribes, Dorion embarks on a perilous journey through the wilderness with her two young children
| 13 | 5 | "Joe Walker: Humble Hero" | March 15, 2023 |
Joe Walker emerges as a pivotal yet understated figure in the exploration of the American West. Known for his modesty and exceptional survival skills, Walker leads a daring expedition across the Sierra Nevada, discovering new routes and forging paths for future pioneers.
| 14 | 6 | "Tom Fitzpatrick: Steadfast Frontiersman" | March 22, 2023 |
Tom Fitzpatrick's journey from Irish immigrant to influential mountain man and trailblazer is chronicled. Renowned for his unwavering determination and expert navigation skills, Fitzpatrick plays a crucial role in guiding settlers through the Rocky Mountains and establishing the Oregon Trail.
| 15 | 7 | "Jim Clyman: Frontier Survivor" | March 29, 2023 |
Clyman's experiences as a fur trapper, explorer, and survivor in the rugged American West showcase his resilience and adaptability in the face of adversity. From encounters with hostile Native American tribes to surviving grueling conditions, Clyman's tale epitomizes the challenges and triumphs of life on the frontier
| 16 | 8 | "William Sublette: King of the Fur Trade" | April 5, 2023 |
As a co-founder of the Rocky Mountain Fur Company, Sublette plays a central role in shaping the economic landscape of the American West. His shrewd business acumen, combined with his adventurous spirit, solidifies his legacy as a trailblazer in the fur trade.

=== Season 3 (2023) ===
| No. overall | No. in season | Title | Original release date |
|---|---|---|---|
| 17 | 1 | "Anne Bailey: Horseback Heroine" | May 6, 2023 |
The extraordinary life of Anne Bailey, also known as "Mad Anne," unfolds. Renowned for her fearless riding and bravery during the American Revolutionary War and the frontier conflicts, Bailey becomes a legendary figure in West Virginia folklore.
| 18 | 2 | "William Bartram: America's First Great Naturalist" | May 13, 2023 |
The pioneering work of William Bartram in exploring and documenting the natural world of North America is spotlighted. Bartram's groundbreaking travels through the southeastern United States during the late 18th century result in detailed botanical and ethnographic studies.
| 19 | 3 | "Daniel Boone: Cunning Woodsman" | May 20, 2023 |
Daniel Boone's exceptional skills as a woodsman and hunter are highlighted as he navigates the challenges of the American frontier. Boone's expertise in tracking, hunting, and survival enable him to lead settlers through the treacherous wilderness of Kentucky, opening up new territories for exploration and settlement.
| 20 | 4 | "Mason & Dixon: Trailblazing Surveyors" | May 27, 2023 |
The partnership of Charles Mason and Jeremiah Dixon is chronicled as they undertake the monumental task of surveying the boundary between Pennsylvania and Maryland. This boundary, known as the Mason–Dixon line, later becomes symbolic in the division between the North and South.
| 21 | 5 | "James Harrod: Kentucky's Founding Father" | June 3, 2023 |
The pioneering efforts of James Harrod are showcased as he leads settlers to establish the first permanent American settlement in Kentucky. Harrod's leadership and vision in founding Harrodsburg mark a significant moment in the westward expansion of the United States.
| 22 | 6 | "Christopher Gist: Unsung Hero of the First Frontier" | June 10, 2023 |
The critical yet often overlooked contributions of Christopher Gist to early American exploration are brought to light. As a skilled surveyor and scout, Gist plays a pivotal role in mapping the Ohio Valley and aiding settlers during the French and Indian War. His bravery, expertise, and detailed journals significantly impact the westward expansion
| 23 | 7 | "George Croghan: Frontier Peacemaker" | June 17, 2023 |
The diplomatic efforts of George Croghan in early American frontier history are explored. As a skilled negotiator and Indian agent, Croghan works tirelessly to foster peaceful relations between Native American tribes and colonial settlers.
| 24 | 8 | "Robert Rogers: Frontier Soldier" | June 24, 2023 |
The daring exploits and military innovations of Robert Rogers are detailed as he becomes a legendary figure during the French and Indian War. As the leader of Rogers' Rangers, he develops unconventional warfare tactics, including the famous "Rogers' Rules of Ranging," which revolutionize frontier combat.

=== Season 4 (2024) ===
| No. overall | No. in season | Title | Original release date |
|---|---|---|---|
| 25 | 1 | "Jim Baker: A Born Leader" | March 24, 2024 |
In the episode "Jim Baker: A Born Leader," the remarkable life of Jim Baker, a prominent mountain man and frontiersman, is chronicled. Known for his leadership and survival skills, Baker plays a crucial role in various expeditions and as a guide for settlers navigating the challenging terrain of the American West.
| 26 | 2 | "Jim Beckwourth: The Long Ride" | March 31, 2024 |
The episode highlights his time with the Crow Nation, his discovery of Beckwourth Pass, and his enduring legacy as a trailblazer who defied the odds and left an indelible mark on the American frontier.
| 27 | 3 | "Bill Hamilton: The Last Mountain Man" | April 7, 2024 |
The life and legacy of Bill Hamilton, one of the final figures of the mountain man era, are examined. Renowned for his survival skills, hunting prowess, and deep understanding of the wilderness, Hamilton embodies the rugged spirit of the American frontier.
| 28 | 4 | "Lucien Maxwell: Legend of New Mexico" | April 14, 2024 |
The captivating story of Lucien Maxwell, a prominent figure in the history of the American Southwest, is brought to life. Maxwell's legacy is deeply intertwined with the development of New Mexico, where he becomes one of the largest landowners and a key player in the region's economic and social landscape.
| 29 | 5 | "Joe Meek: A Fearless Fighter" | April 21, 2024 |
Meek's fearless spirit and formidable skills in wilderness survival make him a legendary figure of the American West. The episode delves into his exploits, including his encounters with Native American tribes, his participation in the fur trade, and his contributions to the exploration and settlement of the Oregon Territory
| 30 | 6 | "John Coffee Hays: A Texas Legend" | April 28, 2024 |
Hays, known as one of the greatest Texas Rangers, played a crucial role in maintaining law and order on the frontier during the tumultuous years of the Republic of Texas. His leadership, marksmanship, and strategic acumen earned him a legendary reputation as a fearless lawman and frontiersman, leaving an indelible mark on the history of Texas and the American West.
| 31 | 7 | "John Mullan: Roadbuilder of the West" | May 5, 2024 |
Young Army officer John Mullan heads west to help establish an important wagon route through the Northern Rockies. But, before he can build his road, Mullan must survive a dangerous encounter with the Yakima in Washington Territory.
