= The Cowboy Way =

The Cowboy Way may refer to:

- The Cowboy Way (film), a 1994 action comedy film
- The Cowboy Way (album) by Riders in the Sky
- The Cowboy Way (TV series), INSP original reality TV show about cowboys and ranching
