= Wild West Chronicles =

American television series

- Genre: History; Western
- Inspired by: Bat Masterson
- Directed by: Michael S. Ojeda; Jim Orr
- Starring: Jack Elliott; David Thomas Newman; Tom Gelo; Yakov Kolontarov
- No. of seasons: 4
- No. of episodes: 51

Production
- Executive producers: Craig Miller; Dale Ardizzone; David Cerullo; Doug Butts; Gary Tarpinian; Paninee Theeranuntawat
- Producers: Becca Jauregui; Dan McCarthy; James Millican; Justin Bondy; Peter Sherayko; Will Ilgen
- Running time: 22 minutes
- Production company: MorningStar Entertainment

Original release
- Network: INSP
- Release: February 23, 2020 – present

Wild West Chronicles is an American television series, which airs on INSP. The historical docudrama series follows the life of Bat Masterson, a newspaper reporter who traveled the frontier during the late 1800s to uncover stories about the Wild West.

The show stars Jack Elliott as Masterson, with the first show airing in 2020. The first season was temporarily halted during COVID-19, before returning in 2021. A third season of the show aired in 2023, and its fourth season in September 2024. Season 5 aired on INSP in March and April of 2026.

== Plot ==
Bat Masterson, once a feared lawman, leaves his job of being a sheriff to write about stories of the American frontier, meeting with eyewitnesses who share their memories of many infamous people in the "Wild West", which includes Wild Bill Hickok, Pearl Hart, Stagecoach Mary, Butch Cassidy, and Bass Reeves.

== Episodes ==
| Season | Episodes | Originally released | |
| Season | Episodes | First released | Last released |
|---|---|---|---|
| 1 | 15 | February 23, 2020 | July 18, 2021 |
| 2 | 11 | July 28, 2022 | September 1, 2022 |
| 3 | 13 | April 6, 2023 | June 29, 2023 |
| 4 | 12 | September 4, 2024 | November 20, 2024 |
| 5 | 8 | March 2026 | |

=== Season 1 (2020-2021) ===
| No. overall | No. in season | Title | Original release date |
|---|---|---|---|
| 1 | 1 | "The Bandit Queen" | February 23, 2020 |
Bat Masterson investigates the notorious Pearl Hart, a woman who becomes a bandit after her life takes a drastic turn in the Wild West.
| 2 | 2 | "The Dalton Gang" | February 23, 2020 |
The infamous Dalton Gang attempts a daring bank robbery, leading to a violent confrontation that captures the attention of Bat Masterson and lawmen.
| 3 | 3 | "The Great Train Robbery" | April 4, 2020 |
Outlaw Butch Cassidy leads the Wild Bunch in a daring train heist, evading capture through clever tactics and becoming legends in Wild West lore.
| 4 | 4 | "The Legend of the Blue-Eyed Apache" | May 30, 2021 |
After leaving his family, a boy becomes a man after joining the Apache. His mom remains hopeful she will see him again.
| 5 | 5 | "The Real Lone Star Ranger" | April 18, 2021 |
Ira Aten, a young ranger, teams up with a local rancher in pursuit of an alleged killer.
| 6 | 6 | "Bass Reeves: Trailblazing Lawman" | April 25, 2021 |
After living on Indian Territory, the story follows how Bass Reeves becomes a legendary lawman in the west.
| 7 | 7 | "Wild Bill Hickok & the First Quick-Draw Duel" | April 11, 2021 |
Masterson explores the life and legacy of Wild Bill Hickok, a legendary gunslinger known for his quick draw and dramatic exploits.
| 8 | 8 | "Dr. Susan Anderson: Frontier Medicine Woman" | May 2, 2021 |
The episode follows one of the first female doctors on the frontier, Susan Anderson. setting up her own practice in a small town known for mining.
| 9 | 9 | "Elfego Baca & the Frisco Shootout" | May 23, 2021 |
As tension between native Mexican and New Mexico settlers grows, Elfego Baca steps up to keep the peace.
| 10 | 10 | "Bat Masterson & the Dodge City Dead Line: Part 1" | May 9, 2021 |
The first of two part episodes, with Masterson trying to find the killer of a famous singer in Dodge city.
| 11 | 11 | "Bat Masterson & the Dodge City Dead Line: Part 2" | May 16, 2021 |
The second part of the story with Masterson trying to find the man responsible.
| 12 | 12 | "The Hunt for Outlaw Bill Doolin" | June 13, 2021 |
Following a jailbreak, outlaw Bill Doolin is on the run to escape facing justice.
| 13 | 13 | "Stagecoach Mary" | June 13, 2021 |
Bat Masterson chronicles the life of Stagecoach Mary, a pioneering woman who defies societal norms to become a respected stagecoach driver.
| 14 | 14 | "Annie Oakley: Rise of a Shooting Star" | June 6, 2021 |
Annie Oakley and husband Frank Butler get married after a whirlwind romance and set up a sharpshooting double act, touring the west.
| 15 | 15 | "Charles M. Russell: The Cowboy Artist" | July 18, 2021 |
Charlie "Kid" Russell is a cowhand, who is pushed by his wife to focus on his artwork, which ultimately makes him famous.

=== Season 2 (2022) ===
| No. overall | No. in season | Title | Original release date |
|---|---|---|---|
| 16 | 1 | "The Bone War" | July 28, 2022 |
The episode follows a railroad foreman and how the Bone Wars started, after William Harlow Reed finds mysterious fossils with his work crew.
| 17 | 2 | "The Texas Fence-Cutting War" | July 28, 2022 |
A widow must protect her land after her husband tragically dies during a stampede on the ranch.
| 18 | 3 | "Pinkerton Detectives Track a Killer" | August 4, 2022 |
After Union, Missouri sees a bank robbery take place in the town, William Pinkerton is dispatched to help find the culprits.
| 19 | 4 | "The Legend of Nat Love" | August 4, 2022 |
Former slave Nat Love transforms into the famous cowboy Deadwood Dick, gaining renown for his extraordinary skills and thrilling adventures across the untamed West.
| 20 | 5 | "The Masterson Brothers Part 1" | August 11, 2022 |
While working as a reporter, Bat Masterson uncovers an old photo of him and his brothers. He begins to recall his time in Dodge City, where his brother Ed was marshal and he was sheriff.
| 21 | 6 | "The Masterson Brothers Part 2" | August 11, 2022 |
After Ed is gunned down, the third brother James makes the decision to become a lawman, following in Ed's footsteps. After James rises the ranks in Dodge City, Bat is called back to help out his brother.
| 22 | 7 | "Doc Susie Goes Underground" | August 18, 2022 |
After an unexplained death underground, Dr. Susan Anderson isn't convinced about the excuse he was drinking on the job. She goes undercover to try and find the real reason.
| 23 | 8 | "The Gold Rush Lawman" | August 18, 2022 |
After failing to make it during the California Gold Rush, John Hicks Adams is elected as county sheriff. Adams must quickly become experienced to deal with the issues in Santa Clara county.
| 24 | 9 | "Last Shot at the OK Corral" | August 25, 2022 |
C. S. Fly has ambitions of opening his own photography studio. An unexpected gunfight starts next to the studio, allowing them to document the events of the Gunfight at the O.K. Corral.
| 25 | 10 | "Jim Roberts Cleans Up Jerome" | August 25, 2022 |
Jerome, Arizona went through a period of lawlessness, and Jim Roberts was hired to help clean up the town's act. Roberts gets to work on arresting those who are repeatedly breaking the law.
| 26 | 11 | "Battle Beneath the Mountain" | September 1, 2022 |
Two rival silver mining companies meet below the Idaho mountain range, and the competition turns violent and the battle rages for days.

=== Season 3 (2023) ===
| No. overall | No. in season | Title | Original release date |
|---|---|---|---|
| 27 | 1 | "Bat Masterson to the Rescue" | April 6, 2023 |
As a former lawman, Masterson must help out a friend who has been falsely imprisoned.
| 28 | 2 | "Billy the Kid: Birth of an Outlaw" | April 13, 2023 |
William Bonney is given a new opportunity by a ranch owner. Things quickly deteriorate when his boss is killed in cold blood, with events forcing Bonney to become Billy the Kid.
| 29 | 3 | "Bass Reeves Tracks Belle Starr" | April 20, 2023 |
Bass Reeves is given the task of arresting Belle Starr He arrives at her social club to make the arrest, but things don't go as planned.
| 30 | 4 | "Burton Mossman Crosses the Line" | April 27, 2023 |
After Mossman fails to arrest notorious crime man Augustine Chacon, he must make a risky move in order to continue the pursuit, by crossing the border into Mexico.
| 31 | 5 | "The Gold Rush Detectives" | May 4, 2023 |
Wells Fargo has a substantial robbery take place, where $9,000 of gold is stolen. Henry Johnson and Isaiah Lees are hired as detectives to track down the gold.
| 32 | 6 | "Sister Blandina and the Killer" | May 11, 2023 |
Sister Blandina a 22-year-old missionary, arrives in Trinidad, Colorado with the open of opening a school. The story takes a twist after a student's father is arrested for murder.
| 33 | 7 | "Calamity Jane Saves the Day" | May 18, 2023 |
Calamity Jane is known in town as a hot-tempered drunk. When there is a smallpox outbreak, as she is immune she comes to the rescue to help the town doctor.
| 34 | 8 | "The Many Faces of Charles Siringo" | May 25, 2023 |
The undercover specialist Charles Siringo struggles to track down fugitives The Smith Brothers, so he travels to the Smith family farm and poses as an employee to find a lead in the case.
| 35 | 9 | "The Trials of Temple Houston" | June 1, 2023 |
Temple Houston lives in Oklahoma and works hard to try and live up to the family name as an attorney. The courtroom is sometimes unimpressed with his antics, and a feud turns to bloodshed.
| 36 | 10 | "The Discoveries of George McJunkin" | June 8, 2023 |
Former slave George McJunkin makes an incredible discovery on the ranch after a severe storm. Years later, the story is shared with newspaper editor, Bat Masterson.
| 37 | 11 | "Al Jennings and the Legend of Dick West" | June 15, 2023 |
While growing tired of his current life, Al Jennings dreams of becoming a gunslinger in the west. His life changes after a chance encounter with Dick West.
| 38 | 12 | "Annie Oakley & Buffalo Bill's Wild West Showdown" | June 22, 2023 |
Buffalo Bill's Wild West is one of the most popular outdoor shows in the world. The shows highlight is Annie Oakley, However Bill and Oakley don't always get along.
| 39 | 13 | "The Four Dead in Five Seconds Gunfight" | June 29, 2023 |
Reporter Bat Masterson hears from a Mexican rancher about the terrible events at The Four Dead in Five Seconds Gunfight. Its known as one of El Paso's most notorious gun fights.

=== Season 4 (2024) ===
| No. overall | No. in season | Title | Original release date |
|---|---|---|---|
| 40 | 1 | "Bat Masterson Leaves the West" | September 4, 2024 |
Bat Masterson leaves his home to become the manager at Denver's Palace Theatre. He begins to question his life as a gunslinger when he meets Emma Walter, known as The Queen of Clubs.
| 41 | 2 | "Bass Reeves: A Father's Justice" | September 11, 2024 |
Local lawmakers cannot believe Bass' promise, after he states he's willing to catch a killer who murdered his wife. The killer is presumed to be Bennie, Bass Reeves' son.
| 42 | 3 | "Bronco Bill's Treasure" | September 18, 2024 |
It looks like Bronco Bill and his gang cannot be stopped from robbing trains whenever they please. Two lawmakers join forces to try and stop the robberies and violence.
| 43 | 4 | "Ada Curnutt, U.S. Deputy Marshal" | September 25, 2024 |
Becoming one of Oklahoma's first female Deputy Marshal's, Ada Curnutt is set with the task of bringing down two counterfeiters. Her plan is unorthodox, as she won't need to take them in using guns.
| 44 | 5 | "Wong Fee Lee Stakes His Claim" | October 2, 2024 |
Chinese immigrant Wong lands in the country with the hope of finding gold and starting himself a business. There is a turn of events however when his convoy is intercepted by bandits.
| 45 | 6 | "Black Bart's Revenge" | October 9, 2024 |
Private investigator Harry Morse join in with the hunt for the notorious stagecoach outlaw, Black Bart.
| 46 | 7 | "Elijah Briant and the Wild Bunch" | October 16, 2024 |
The episode follows Elijah Briant, a well mannered man who becomes the town sheriff. He must change his ways when bandits appear near town.
| 47 | 8 | "El Bandito Vasquez" | October 23, 2024 |
The notorious bandito, Tiburcio Vásquez, is known for terrorising Los Angeles county, with a keen reporter shadowing the sheriff in the hunt for Vasquez.
| 48 | 9 | "Law Comes to No Man's Land" | October 30, 2024 |
Oklahoma's Panhandle is viewed as a no mans land, with Marshal Chris Madsen and judge John Buford aim to bring law and order to this part of OK.
| 49 | 10 | "Willie Kennard Makes His Mark in History" | November 6, 2024 |
Yankee Hill runs a newspaper ad to find a new marshal after the town comes under siege by gunslingers.
| 50 | 11 | "John Wesley Hardin: Killer on the Texas Frontier" | November 13, 2024 |
When John Wesley Hardin murders a sheriff, it creates a ripple effect across Texas. An unlikely duo team up to end Hardin's criminal enterprise.
| 51 | 12 | "The Battle of Stone Corral" | November 20, 2024 |
The episode follows the pursuit of bandits to Stone Corral, when a legendary gun fight begins. Today its known as the Battle of Stone Corral.

== Reception ==
The Dove Foundation awarded the series the Dove Seal of Approval.
