= Neurologic & Orthopedic Hospital of Chicago =

Hospital in Chicago, Illinois, US

Coordinates: 41°57′50.2″N 87°40′37.7″W

The Neurologic & Orthopedic Hospital of Chicago (or NOHC) was a medical center from 1987 to 2009.

NOHC was an eight-storey hospital with approximately 200,000 square feet (19,000 m^{2}), with all services conveniently located off of a central elevator bank. It had 10 operating rooms, 52 medical/surgical beds, 15 rehabilitation beds, and 18 intensive care beds. NOHC was also equipped with state-of-the-art medical equipment, including a stereotactic radiosurgery suite (Gamma Knife), a neuroangiography suite (Siemen's Biplane), and a comprehensive diagnostic imaging suite (1.5 MRI, CT and general x-ray).

In 2009 the hospital closed and the doctors merged with NorthShore University HealthSystem.

== History ==
Dr. Leonard J. Cerullo founded the Chicago Institute of Neurosurgery and Neuroresearch Medical Group (“CINN”) in 1987 and oversaw its growth into one of the largest physician practices specializing in neurologic care in the Midwest. Dr. Cerullo's original vision was to create a hospital dedicated to neurologic care with the founding of the Neurologic & Orthopedic Institute of Chicago in 2003. In 2007, the name was changed to “Neurologic and Orthopedic Hospital of Chicago.” The hospital closed suddenly in 2009.

== Clinical leadership ==
NOHC's medical staff included a number of the most respected neurological and orthopedic physicians in the market. The neurological practice was led by CINN (Chicago Institute of Neurosurgery and Neuroresearch), which consisted of 9 neurosurgeons, 2 neurologists, 1 neurointerventionalist, and 5 physiatrists. While NOHC acted as the “hub,” CINN also maintained satellite offices at four other locations throughout Chicago. Dr. John Hefferon, one of the leading orthopedic physicians in Chicago, was the Medical Director for NOHC's orthopedic service line that focuses on sports medicine, joint replacement & resurfacing, and work-related injuries. He is also the former team physician for the Chicago Bulls and is a current league physician for the NBA.

Preston Wolin, director of sports medicine, is also the former team physician for Major League Soccer's Chicago Fire.

== Specialized services and treatments ==
NOHC was the nation's first hospital dedicated exclusively to the diagnosis, treatment, and rehabilitation of neurological and orthopedic patients. From October 2006 to September 2007, NOHC performed over 1,100 neurosurgical cases, 910 orthopedic cases and 1650 pain procedures. NOHC physicians took part in studies that lead to new treatment options for challenging conditions. They were among the first in the nation to use technologies that later became standards of care: guided imaging in spine surgery, implanted artificial discs, inserted stents and coils designed to keep blood vessels open, and use of the Gamma Knife to destroy tumors. They were developing new knee and hip replacement options that allow patients to resume an active lifestyle.

Offered at NOHC, BIRMINGHAM Hip resurfacing was a relatively new procedure approved by the FDA in 2006. It is a minimally invasive alternative to total hip replacement that preserves the top of the femur with a metal ball. Dr. Mitchell Sheinkop, director of the joint replacement program, has performed this procedure on former MLB player Albert Belle and former NFL quarterback Jim Miller. He was also the first orthopedic surgeon in Chicago to be trained in the use of a knee-preserving resurfacing procedure called “The Journey Deuce.”

== Ranking and achievements ==
NOHC was named by HealthGrades in 2008 as the best hospital in Illinois for spine surgery, and given 5 stars for back and neck surgery, spinal fusion, and the Spine Surgery Excellence Award 2008, placing it in the top 5% of the country. The same study also noted that patients who undergo brain or spine surgery at NOHC frequently have fewer complications and shorter hospital stays, and that the joint replacement department claims one of the lowest infection rates in the nation.
