= INSP (TV network) =

American pay television channel

- Country: United States
- Headquarters: Indian Land, South Carolina

Programming
- Language: English
- Picture format: 1080i (HDTV); 480i (SDTV)

Ownership
- Owner: INSP LLC (The Inspirational Network, Inc.)
- Key people: David Cerullo (Chairman and Chief Executive Officer); Dale Ardizzone (Chief Operating Officer); Mark Favaro (Executive VP Worldwide Sales); Doug Butts (Senior VP Programming)

History
- Launched: 1978; 48 years ago
- Former names: PTL – The Inspirational Network (1978–1990); The Inspiration Network (1990–2010)

Links
- Website: insp.com

Availability

Streaming media
- Service(s): Frndly TV, FuboTV, Philo, Sling TV

INSP (formerly The Inspiration Network) is an American digital cable television network that features primarily western programs and films and is headquartered in Indian Land, South Carolina, a suburb of Charlotte, North Carolina.

Until 2010, INSP was a non-profit ministry focused network. In October 2010, it was rebranded and launched as a socially conservative, commercial-supported family entertainment network (over time becoming centered around westerns), and has Nielsen C3 ratings status. As of 2021, more than 60 million households receive INSP.

== History ==
INSP was founded in 1978 as the PTL Television Network, a religious television network founded by Christian televangelists Jim Bakker and his wife, Tammy Faye Bakker. The network was the flagship channel for their daily Christian variety program, The PTL Club. The network later became known as the PTL Satellite Network and then PTL – The Inspirational Network.

In 1990, after Jim Bakker resigned, the PTL Television network filed for bankruptcy. Morris Cerullo World Evangelism eventually purchased the network from the United States Bankruptcy Court in Columbia, South Carolina, and subsequently removed PTL from its name. Morris Cerullo's son, David Cerullo, is CEO of the network.

In October 2010, the network had a major rebranding with an added emphasis on family programming. Along with the rebranding came a new logo, tagline and renaming from The Inspiration Network to INSP. At the end of 2021, Variety reported that INSP's household viewers were up 1,171% since 2010.

In 2022, INSP changed its logo to include a cowboy hat to emphasize the continued success of its western-based shows and films. Prior to the logo change, INSP had also introduced the tagline, "Heroes Live Here". Its focus on western-based programming has been reported to be the reason behind its continued ratings success, with primetime viewing growing 17% on the previous year. On March 30, 2022, Imagicomm Communications purchased eighteen stations in twelve markets from Cox Media Group for $488 million; this was to help Cox Media comply with regulatory requirements related to a proposed merger between Tegna and Standard Media, which Cox was assisting in side transactions. Imagicomm operates as a shell company of INSP.

In May 2022, INSP launched the Cowboy Way Channel, an internet streaming service aimed at younger viewers. Named after INSP's original series, The Cowboy Way, the service features other original series and Western and outdoor-themed movies. On September 3, 2024, the service rebranded as Western Bound.

== Programming ==
=== Current programming ===
Currently, INSP features mostly Westerns (both series and movies), with Mike Murdock's Campmeeting in the early mornings. As of January 9, 2024, Western television series regularly aired by INSP include Gunsmoke, Bonanza, Wagon Train, The Virginian, Rawhide, Tales of Wells Fargo, The Rifleman, Laramie, The Big Valley, Cheyenne, Alias Smith and Jones, and How the West Was Won. Films regularly aired by INSP include More Dead Than Alive, Rage at Dawn, Gun the Man Down, High Lonesome, Hardcase, Yuma, Fort Dobbs, Yellowstone Kelly, The Outlaw Josey Wales, They Call Me Trinity, Joe Kidd, Comanche Station, Tall Man Riding, Badman's Territory, Man in the Saddle, Tulsa, Ambush at Cimarron Pass, Colt .45, and Open Range.

=== Original series ===
In its early years, INSP produced a wide range of original programming, including specials, concerts, and inspirational entertainment. While some of the overnight or early morning programming was faith-based, the network's daytime and evening scheduling was original content focused on a variety of family-oriented and traditional value productions. In 2010, with INSP's rebrand, the channel subsequently changed its programming. It increased the amount of original series, but also diversified into other areas of content, such as dramas and lifestyle television series. One of the first major projects of this transition was A Walton's Family Reunion, a program that increased the network's focus on Western-themed entertainment. In the special, the surviving cast members of The Waltons reunited on Walton's Mountain almost 30 years after the series' conclusion.

In 2011, a short-form episode from INSP's Moments titled "Thank You for Your Service" became viral. It was featured on ABC's The View, the Pentagon Channel, and USAA's website. It was also shown at several national conventions and conferences, including the American Legion, Veterans of Foreign Wars, Vietnam Veterans of America, and Jewish War Veterans. During a Vietnam memorial in which "Thank You for Your Service" aired, General Claude M. Kicklighter noted, "This stirring tribute never fails to inspire deep emotions. It has helped bring healing and encouragement to true patriots, many of whom have felt taken for granted and ignored."

In 2013, Old Henry was launched by INSP, a series of interstitials. Actors who appeared on the interstitials included Ralph Waite from The Waltons (in one of his final television roles before his death in February 2014) and Rachel Hendrix from October Baby. They aired as six separate interstitials, but due to their popularity, were merged together into a 30-minute version with additional content. In early 2014, INSP announced plans for an increased focus on original content, creating the position of Vice President of Original Programming.

Content on INSP changed again in 2015, as it premiered its first reality television series titled Handcrafted America, hosted by Jill Wagner. Handcrafted America originally aired exclusively on INSP. After its linear run, the series was licensed by Amazon Prime Video. In the program, host Wagner travels the country to interview talented artisans who continue to make products the traditional way, with their own two hands. A year later, one of its longest running original series The Cowboy Way premiered, running until 2020, and aired for seven seasons. In 2019, Ultimate Cowboy Showdown, hosted by Trace Adkins premiered, airing for four seasons until 2023. It continued with the same strategic approach as The Cowboy Way, with the entire schedule for INSP having a focus on Westerns.

As of 2025, INSP has a number of original series currently airing or new series in development, many of which are described as Western dramas. Into the Wild Frontier and Wild West Chronicles are both docudramas, exploring the historical events in the American frontier. Both have been widely praised for the depiction of the timeline in American history. The most successful historical docuseries by INSP is Elkhorn, which has run for two seasons, with the first winning many notable accolades for its depiction of Theodore Roosevelt. Blue Ridge: The Series is a police drama based on the film of the same name that premiered on INSP in 2024, and is one of a few non-Western programs that airs on the channel.

== Facilities and studio ==
INSP originally was headquartered in studios and offices in Charlotte, North Carolina. The broadcast facility remains in Charlotte, while the network's offices were relocated to a campus known as CrossRidge (formerly named the City of Light) in Indian Land, South Carolina in the 2010s.

== Accolades ==
INSP has been honored with several industry awards in television:

- 2012: The PTC Seal of Approval from the Parents Television Council
- 2012: Cablefax FAXIES Awards finalist in two categories; Trade Show Marketing/PR and Direct Response Marketing
- 2013: Nominated in the Category for Human Concerns at The New York Film & Television Festival
- 2014: CableFax Digital Awards finalist in their Social Good Campaign for Moments.org
- 2014: Telly Awards:
  - The Silver award in the Category of Entertainment for Going Home
  - The Bronze award in the Category of Entertainment for Italian Family
  - The Bronze award in the Category of Use of Humor for Italian Family
- 2016: CableFax Program Award: Jill Wagner, Best Family Friendly Host, Handcrafted America Season 1
- 2017: Telly Awards:
  - The Bronze award in the Category of General Cultural for Handcrafted America
  - The Bronze award in the Category of General Travel/Tourism for Handcrafted America
- 2017: CableFax Program Award: Taylor Hicks, Best Family Friendly Host, State Plate
