= Legacy International Center =

Coordinates: 32.7592°N 117.1709°W

Legacy International Center is a biblical-themed hotel and religious center in San Diego's Mission Valley, California, US. It was built by American televangelist Morris Cerullo.

The 18-acre complex was built for $190 million and opened in February 2020. The center contains a 110-foot-long replica of the Wailing Wall in Jerusalem, and a 250-seat restaurant. It also contains a 4-D domed theater (motion seats, wind blasts, mist, smells) that initially showed two films, “Wings Over Israel” and “Walk Through the Bible”. It also contains Cerullo's religious relics, depictions of catacombs with replicas of biblical scenes, and a child/teen area.

The hotel contains 126 rooms, a 150-seat restaurant, and a conference facility.

The center also includes the offices for Morris Cerullo World Evangelism, a ballroom, and a 500-seat theater.

Morris Cerullo World Evangelism purchased the foreclosed Mission Valley Resort in 2011, and the center was approved for construction in 2017.
