= John Potts (American frontiersman) =

Member of the Lewis and Clark Expedition (born c. 1776)

John Potts (born about 1776 in Dillenburg † 1809 at the banks of the Jefferson River) was a member of the Lewis and Clark Expedition.

After the expedition, Potts frequently teamed up with John Colter, another former expedition member, to explore what is now Montana. In 1808, he and Potts were both injured fighting the Blackfoot tribe as they led a party of the Crow Tribe to Fort Raymond. In 1809, another altercation with the Blackfoot resulted in John Potts' death and Colter's capture. While going by canoe up the Jefferson River, Potts and Colter encountered several hundred Blackfoot who demanded they come ashore. Colter went ashore and was disarmed and stripped naked. When Potts then refused to come ashore he was hit by an arrow and wounded. Potts in his turn shot one of the Blackfoot and died riddled with arrows fired from the shore. His body was brought ashore and hacked to pieces.

A rock on the Martian Endeavour Crater was named for Potts.
