= Handcrafted America =

American TV series

- Genre: Reality
- Starring: Jill Wagner
- Country of origin: United States
- No. of seasons: 3
- No. of episodes: 39

Production
- Executive producers: David Cerullo; Dale Ardizzone; Scott Galloway
- Producers: Doug Butts; Craig Miller; Rex Robinson; Sheri Spitz; Liz Pollock; Christiana Tye; John Litschke; Linda Midgett; Eric Davis; Jeanne-Marie Bremer; Theresa Hayward; Cindy Wallach; Patti Hughes
- Running time: 30 minutes
- Production companies: INSP; Susie Films

Original release
- Network: INSP
- Release: March 1, 2016 – November 3, 2017

Handcrafted America is an American TV series, which is broadcast on INSP. It is hosted by Jill Wagner, who travels across the United States visiting people with specialist crafts. Each episode, Wagner visits three different artists to discuss and study their craft.

The show first aired in 2015 and has a total of 39 episodes across three seasons. The entire series is available on Amazon Prime Video.

== Synopsis ==
Each week, the show visits three different locations to interview and study certain specialist crafts. There is typically a range from ceramics to homemade products, to largescale productions of a particular item. In an interview, the host of the show Jill Wagner stated that she feels privileged to speak each week with people who have perfected their craft. The crafts on each episode are diverse, ranging from musical instruments, silverware, bicycles, glassware, and jewelry.

== Cast ==
Each show is hosted by Jill Wagner. Each week, three guest artists and craftsmen and women are visited at their place of work.

== Episodes ==
=== Series overview ===
Season	Episodes	Originally released	
Season	Episodes	First released	Last released
1	13	March 1, 2016	May 17, 2016
2	13	October 21, 2016	February 17, 2017
3	13	August 11, 2017	November 3, 2017

=== Season 1 (2016) ===
No. overall	No. in season	Title	Directed by	Original release date
1	1	"Handcrafted America – Clocks, Chairs and Blacksmithing"	Scott Galloway and Sheri Hirshman	March 1, 2016
Host Jill Wagner meets a clockmaker in Michigan who keeps a dying art ticking, a 7th generation chair maker in North Carolina who uses no glue or nails, and a female blacksmith in Washington who shapes iron and defies stereotypes at the same time.
2	2	"Handcrafted America – Quilt Maker, Rifles and Stone Carver"	Scott Galloway and Sheri Hirshman	March 1, 2016
Host Jill Wagner travels to Texas to meet a young woman steeped in the traditions of quilt making. In North Carolina, Jill has a blast with a gunsmith who makes flintlock rifles. Finally, she heads to Illinois to watch a gifted stone carver at work.
3	3	"Handcrafted America – Glasses, Bicycles and Books"	Scott Galloway and Sheri Hirshman	March 8, 2016
Host Jill Wagner meets a glass blower who makes drinking glasses that overflow with colors, a bicycle maker with a 7‐year waiting list, and a book publisher who painstakingly builds books one letter at a time on his 100‐year‐old printing press.
4	4	"Handcrafted America – Leather Wallets, Guitars and Shoes"	Scott Galloway and Sheri Hirshman	March 15, 2016
Host Jill Wagner travels to Texas Hill Country to meet a fifth‐generation leatherworker. In Virginia, she hangs out with one of America's greatest guitar makers. Finally, she meets a Chicago architect who gave up designing buildings to make shoes.
5	5	"Handcrafted America -Bladesmithing, Woodworking and Leather Bags"	Scott Galloway and Sheri Hirshman	March 22, 2016
Host Jill Wagner meets husband‐and‐wife master blade smiths who forget their own knives in the Alaskan backcountry, a master woodworker in North Carolina, and a talented Texas leatherworker who makes handbags worthy of the red carpet.
6	6	"Handcrafted America – Wood Pens, Leather Boots and Doors"	Scott Galloway and Sheri Hirshman	March 29, 2016
Host Jill Wagner travels to Illinois to meet a husband and wife who fashion pens from reclaimed wood. In California, she hangs out with a custom cowboy bootmaker. Finally, she visits a New Mexico business that gives new life to vintage doors.
7	7	"Handcrafted America – Sgraffito Ceramics, Wood Tables, and Steampunk Lamps"	Scott Galloway and Sheri Hirshman	April 5, 2016
Host Jill Wagner visits a New Jersey ceramicist who scratches beautiful designs into pottery. In Wisconsin, she meets a woodworker who makes wood low like fabric. Finally, in Minnesota, she watches a lamp maker make new lamps from old machine parts.
8	8	"Handcrafted America – Woven Rugs, Sunglasses and Billiard Tables"	Scott Galloway and Sheri Hirshman	April 12, 2016
Host Jill Wagner visits a Minnesota weaver who makes rugs with intricate geometric designs. In San Francisco, she learns how to make handcrafted sunglasses. And, in New Jersey, she meets a man who left a career in engineering to make billiard tables.
9	9	"Handcrafted America – Stained Glass, Baseballs, Footballs, and Jewellery Boxes"	Scott Galloway and Sheri Hirshman	April 19, 2016
Host Jill Wagner meets a Minnesota artist who creates landscape-themed, stained-glass panels. In New Jersey, she visits an entrepreneur who makes vintage baseballs and footballs. And, in Wisconsin, she helps a woodworker make intricate jewellery boxes.
10	10	"Handcrafted America – Millinery, Longbows and Surfboards"	Scott Galloway and Sheri Hirshman	April 26, 2016
Host Jill Wagner visits the Milwaukee studio of husband-and-wife hat makers who use 18th century technology to build 21st century hats. Then, she's off to California to meet two artisans who use exotic woods to make precision longbows and surfboards featuring Ventana Surfboards & Supplies.
11	11	"Handcrafted America – Denim, Wood Marquetry, and Bedframes"	Scott Galloway and Sheri Hirshman	May 3, 2016
Host Jill Wagner visits a North Carolina clothing designer who makes custom-fitted blue jeans. In Boston, she learns how to create elaborate designs using thin sheets of wood veneer. Finally, in Oregon, she meets a man who makes custom steel bedframes.
12	12	"Handcrafted America – Silver Flatware, Aviaries, and Bamboo Fly Fishing Rods"	Scott Galloway and Sheri Hirshman	May 10, 2016
Host Jill Wagner visits a Massachusetts silversmith who uses centuries-old techniques to make heirloom flatware. In North Carolina, she meets a craftsman who builds amazing aviaries. Lastly, she visits Oregon where she learns how to make traditional bamboo fly rods.
13	13	"Handcrafted America – Outdoor Furniture, Flutes, and Paper Goods"	Scott Galloway and Sheri Hirshman	May 17, 2016
Host Jill Wagner visits a North Carolina woodworker who turns whiskey barrels into rustic outdoor furniture. In Boston, she watches artisans form precious metals into world-class flutes. And, in Oregon, she helps transform old rags into fine papers.

=== Season 2 (2017) ===
No. overall	No. in season	Title	Directed by	Original release date
14	1	"Handcrafted America – Glass Chandeliers, Garden Tools, Western Saddles"	Scott Galloway and Sheri Hirshman	October 21, 2016
Host Jill Wagner visits an Arizona glassblower creating elaborate, colorful chandeliers. In Oregon, she meets one of the only men in the world making iron garden tools. Then, in California, Jill visits a leather maker who carves exquisite saddles.
15	2	"Handcrafted America – Metal Spurs, Hiking Boots, Backpacks"	Scott Galloway and Sheri Hirshman	October 28, 2016
Host Jill Wagner visits a Texas metal worker keeping the cowboy spur tradition alive. In California, Jill treks to a custom hiking boot maker. Finally, in Oregon, she meets a family from Mexico making durable backpacks from all-American materials.
16	3	"Handcrafted America – Kayaks, Door Knockers, Rocking Horses"	Scott Galloway and Sheri Hirshman	November 4, 2016
Host Jill Wagner is in New York meeting a multi-award-winning kayak builder. In Arizona, Jill learns how a craftsman makes old-world style brass door knockers. Finally, in Texas, the grandson of a saddle maker carves incredible wood rocking horses.
17	4	"Handcrafted America – Violins, Yarn and Golf Putters"	Scott Galloway and Sheri Hirshman	November 11, 2016
Host Jill Wagner is in New York City with a violin maker whose instruments are played around the globe. In California, she visits a sheep farm where wool is spun into yards of yarn. In Arizona, Jill improves her golf swing with a custom brass putter.
18	5	"Handcrafted America – Cuckoo Clocks, Baseball Bats, Work Gloves"	Scott Galloway and Sheri Hirshman	November 18, 2016
Host Jill Wagner travels to Wisconsin to meet a multi-award-winning cuckoo clock maker. In Maine, she helps hand turn custom baseball bats from native hardwood trees. In Oregon, she visits one of the last leather work glove makers in the country.
19	6	"Handcrafted America – Pianos, Cowboy Hats, Tin Coffee Pots"	Scott Galloway and Sheri Hirshman	November 25, 2016
Host Jill Wagner meets a cowboy hat maker living in an Old West town in Arizona. Next, in Maine, she visits a piano maker with a passion for the sound of old wood pianos. Then, in Wisconsin, she meets a tinsmith who makes authentic 1800s coffeepots.
20	7	"Handcrafted America – Rocking Chairs, Banjos, Fishing Hoop Nets"	Scott Galloway and Sheri Hirshman	January 6, 2017
Host Jill Wagner travels off the grid in Arkansas to meet a woodworker who whittles stately rocking chairs. In Tennessee, a man has reproduced the sound of a classic 1930s banjo. And in Indiana, she visits a 4th generation fishing hoop net maker.
21	8	"Handcrafted America – Brooms, Copper Kitchenware, Hawaiian Drums"	Scott Galloway and Sheri Hirshman	January 13, 2017
Jill Wagner is in Arkansas with a man who turns broomcorn into handmade brooms. In Tennessee, she meets a craftsman making copper and antler kitchenware. In Hawaii, Jill meets an artisan who crafts traditional Pahu drums from coconut trees.
22	9	"Handcrafted America – Willow Furniture, Skis, Cutting Boards"	Scott Galloway and Sheri Hirshman	January 20, 2017
Host Jill Wagner gathers wheat and learns how to turn it into custom furniture. In Colorado, she helps make custom, handcrafted skis. Finally, in Arkansas, Jill meets a father and son who craft end grain cutting boards using an innovative technique.
23	10	"Handcrafted America – Leather Chinks, Koa Chess Sets, Weathervanes"	Scott Galloway and Sheri Hirshman	January 27, 2017
Host Jill Wagner visits a father son team in Tennessee who make leather riding chinks. In Hawaii, she meets one of the only woodworkers in the world turning Koa chess sets. And in New Hampshire, she's with a coppersmith crafting custom weathervanes.
24	11	"Handcrafted America – Belt Buckles, Music Boxes, Pocket Knives"	Scott Galloway and Sheri Hirshman	February 3, 2017
Host Jill Wagner is in Colorado with an acclaimed team of Western belt buckle makers. In Vermont, she visits a maker using modern technology to revive the distinct sound of 19th century music boxes. And in Indiana, Jill meets a knife making legend.
25	12	"Handcrafted America – Cast Iron Skillets, Baskets, Axes"	Scott Galloway and Sheri Hirshman	February 10, 2017
Host Jill Wagner is in Wisconsin with a metalworker making iron skillets shaped like the 50 states. In Massachusetts, an accomplished basket weaver creates her own designs. In Tennessee, an axe maker uses methods from the 1600s to craft his tools.
26	13	"Handcrafted America – Torches, Stained Glass, Wind Chimes"	Scott Galloway and Sheri Hirshman	February 17, 2017
Host Jill Wagner catches the Aloha spirit in Hawaii with an outdoor torch maker. In Colorado, she meets one of the last traditional stained glass makers. Finally, in Texas, a father and son make wind chimes that can be customized to play any tune.

=== Season 3 (2018) ===
No. overall	No. in season	Title	Directed by	Original release date
27	1	"Handcrafted America – Spear Guns, Wood and Tile Cabinets, and Pewter Goblets"	Scott Galloway and Sheri Hirshman	August 11, 2017
Host Jill Wagner dives deep in Florida with a fisherman making spear guns as accurate as they are beautiful. In Nevada, a female woodworker builds one of a kind wood and tile benches. In California, a metalsmith makes pewter chalices fit for kings.
28	2	"Handcrafted America – Salvaged Stools, Baby Wraps, and Porch Swings"	Scott Galloway and Sheri Hirshman	August 18, 2017
Host Jill Wagner travels to New Orleans to meet a man making colorful stools from hurricane debris. In Alabama, a woman expertly weaves fashionable, functional baby wraps. Finally, in Nevada, a woodworker builds beautiful one-of-a-kind porch swings.
29	3	"Handcrafted America – Street Tiles, Hammocks, and Glass Doors"	Scott Galloway and Sheri Hirshman	August 25, 2017
Host Jill Wagner meets a husband/wife team using ceramic skills to recreate street tiles in New Orleans. A man in Georgia makes camping comfortable with his innovative hammocks. And in Nevada, a glass sculptor creates beautiful, carved glass doors.
30	4	"Handcrafted America – Glass Piggy Banks, Espresso Machines, Rubboards"	Scott Galloway and Sheri Hirshman	September 1, 2017
Host Jill Wagner is in Florida with a glass blower producing piggy banks. In California, she meets a handcrafter of espresso machines. And in Louisiana, she's with an artisan making rubboards, one of the only instruments created in America.
31	5	"Handcrafted America – Fire Screens, Toy Cars, and Pine Needle Baskets"	Scott Galloway and Sheri Hirshman	September 8, 2017
Host Jill Wagner starts in South Carolina with a metalsmith making fire screens in the shape of natural bamboo. In Nebraska, she meets a woodworker making nostalgic toy cars. Finally, a Mississippi woman weaves baskets with materials found in nature.
32	6	"Handcrafted America – Saddle Shoes, Ceramic Stoneware, Spanish Lanterns"	Scott Galloway and Sheri Hirshman	September 15, 2017
Host Jill Wagner visits a 4th generation Nebraskan shoemaker. In South Carolina, she meets a potter who incorporates his backyard greenery finds into stoneware. Finally, in California, Jill meets a couple that recreates historical Spanish lanterns.
33	7	"Handcrafted America – Lightning Etched Lighting, Driftwood Pens, Straw Hats"	Scott Galloway and Sheri Hirshman	September 22, 2017
Host Jill Wagner learns how a Detroit woodworker uses electricity to "paint" light fixtures. In Maryland, an airline pilot finds fragile driftwood to make unique pens. An award-winning South Carolina hat maker is creating museum quality sinamay hats.
34	8	"Handcrafted America – River Fishing Nets, Stand Up Paddle Boards, Aluminium Tables"	Scott Galloway and Sheri Hirshman	September 29, 2017
Host Jill Wagner wades into the waters of Washington with a woodworker making fishing nets. Next, she hits the Florida coast with a stand-up paddleboard maker. In Philadelphia, Jill meets an artisan mixing metal and wood to create whimsical tables.
35	9	"Handcrafted America – Canoes, Adirondack Chairs, Wood Music Stands"	Scott Galloway and Sheri Hirshman	October 6, 2017
Host Jill Wagner visits a maker in Georgia crafting wood canoes. In Michigan, Jill finds a self-taught woodworker who is making state shaped Adirondack chairs. In Idaho, Jill discovers someone hitting the right note making intricate wood music stands.
36	10	"Handcrafted America – Lass and Metal Faucets, Steamer Trunks and Shuffleboard Tables"	Scott Galloway and Sheri Hirshman	October 13, 2017
Host Jill Wagner meets two friends in Maryland who fuse their metal and glass working skills to make unbelievable faucets. A woodworker in Michigan creates classic steamer trunks. And in Georgia, a second-generation family builds shuffleboard tables.
37	11	"Handcrafted America – Metal Handbags, Razors, Neon Signs"	Scott Galloway and Sheri Hirshman	October 20, 2017
Host Jill Wagner heads to Pennsylvania to meet a maker who crafts metal purses in a way no one thought was possible. In Maryland, Jill helps make razors with exotic woods and stones. In Las Vegas, see how neon signs are created to light up the city.
38	12	"Handcrafted America – Silver Teapots, Reclaimed Wood Guitars, Infinity Bookcases"	Scott Galloway and Sheri Hirshman	October 27, 2017
Host Jill Wagner meets a South Carolinan who uses precious metal to shape modern teapots. A maker in Michigan transforms reclaimed wood into electric guitars. And in Georgia, a woodworker shows Jill how he makes his unique infinity shaped bookcase.
39	13	"Handcrafted America – Luminarias, Wristwatches, Cowboy Whips"	Scott Galloway and Sheri Hirshman	November 3, 2017
Host Jill Wagner is in Maryland with a woodworker using rare wood to create incandescent luminarias. A watchmaker in Pennsylvania makes his parts himself, no matter how long it takes. And Jill gets crackin' in Washington with a renowned whip maker.
