= John A. Hefferon =

American sports medicine physician and orthopedic surgeon

John A. Hefferon (born 1950), is an American co-medical director and chairman of the orthopedic surgery department at the Neurologic & Orthopedic Hospital of Chicago (NOHC), founded in 2003 and formerly known as the Neurologic & Orthopedic Institute of Chicago. He is affiliated with Northwestern Memorial Hospital and Saint Joseph Hospital. Hefferon also is an assistant professor in the Department of Orthopaedic Surgery at Northwestern University Medical School in Chicago.

Hefferon’s specialties are arthroscopy, sports medicine, knee surgery, and shoulder replacement surgery. He attained his certification in orthopedic surgery in 1980 from The American Board of Orthopaedic Surgery.

Originally from Bridgeport, Connecticut, Hefferon earned his medical degree in 1972 from Northwestern University Medical School. After graduation, he served as an intern at two places: Northwestern Memorial Hospital (1973) and at Los Angeles County - USC Medical Center, Department of Medicine (1974). His residency at the State University of New York at Buffalo continued his advanced training in orthopedic surgery. After his residency, he pursued a fellowship in Los Angeles in hand surgery at Boyes, Stark, Ashworth, Zemel, Rickard, Inc.

== Career ==
Hefferon is known for total joint replacement of the knee and shoulder, as well as orthopedic sports medicine. He also performs ACL surgery, shoulder replacement, arthroscopic repair surgery, arthroscopic rotator cuff repair surgery, and arthroscopic labrum tear repair surgery.

A former medical director and current league physician for the NBA and WNBA, as well as the 1996 United States Olympics Team, his most famous role may be that of former team physician for the Chicago Bulls, his title from 1984 to 1996. In that capacity he has treated patients as notable as former NBA players Michael Jordan, Scottie Pippen, Dennis Rodman, Ron Harper, John Paxson, Steve Kerr, and Bill Cartwright. He is also a former medical advisory board member at the Lincoln Park Zoo, where he operated on the late Frank the Gorilla in 1996.

== Professional memberships and awards ==
Hefferon was a diplomat for the National Board of Medical Examiners in 1974. He is a current member of the American Medical Association, Chicago Medical Society, Illinois State Medical Society, American College of Sports Medicine, and the NBA Team Physicians Society. From 2000-2003, he was named one of Castle Connolly's “Top Doctors” in the Chicago Metro area.
