= Ben Cerullo =

American evangelist

- Born: Bejamin Cerullo; July 12, 1976 (age 50); San Diego, California, U.S.
- Occupations: evangelist, broadcaster, minister, TV personality
- Years active: 1996–present
- Spouse: Jessica (m. 1998)
- Children: 3

Benjamin Cerullo (born July 12, 1976) is an American evangelist, Christian television show host and producer. He is also the son and first child born to The Inspiration Networks CEO and American televangelist David and his wife Barbara Cerullo. He is also the grandson of the controversial international televangelist and TV show host Morris Cerullo.

== Early life and ministry ==
Cerullo was born in San Diego, California where he lived for 15 years. He grew up surfing, skateboarding, and snowboarding. At the age of 15, Ben's parents, David and Barbara moved the family, Ben and his sister Becky (now Becky Cerullo-Henderson), from San Diego to Charlotte, North Carolina after purchasing Jim & Tammy Faye Bakker's former PTL cable network, The Inspirational Network, out of bankruptcy.

At the age of 18, Ben's love of action sports took him to Vail, Colorado to pursue his dream of becoming a professional snowboarder. Ben spent two seasons in Vail and one season in Mammoth Lakes, California before returning to Charlotte. Ben is a part of The Inspiration Ministries (INSP) where he works with his father David Cerullo. As part of The Inspiration Ministries, Ben is President and Founder of Steelroots, the youth outreach for INSP.

=== Steelroots ministry ===
Named by Charisma Magazine as one of the "30 Emerging Voices that will lead the church in the next decade," Cerullo used his action sports background to start the youth-culture ministry, Steelroots, in 2000. The ministry was one of the first to blend action sports and Christian music to reach youth and young adults.

=== Ben Cerullo Ministries ===
In 2007, Cerullo stepped out from behind the camera as the spokesperson and television personality of Steelroots to launch Ben Cerullo Ministries. Ben still oversees and manages the team and efforts of the Steelroots ministry while serving as the driving force as head of Ben Cerullo Ministries.

== Family and personal ==
Cerullo currently lives in Charlotte with his wife, Jessica, and their daughter, Victoria, and sons, Joel and Josiah.
