= Susan Anderson =

American physician and doctor

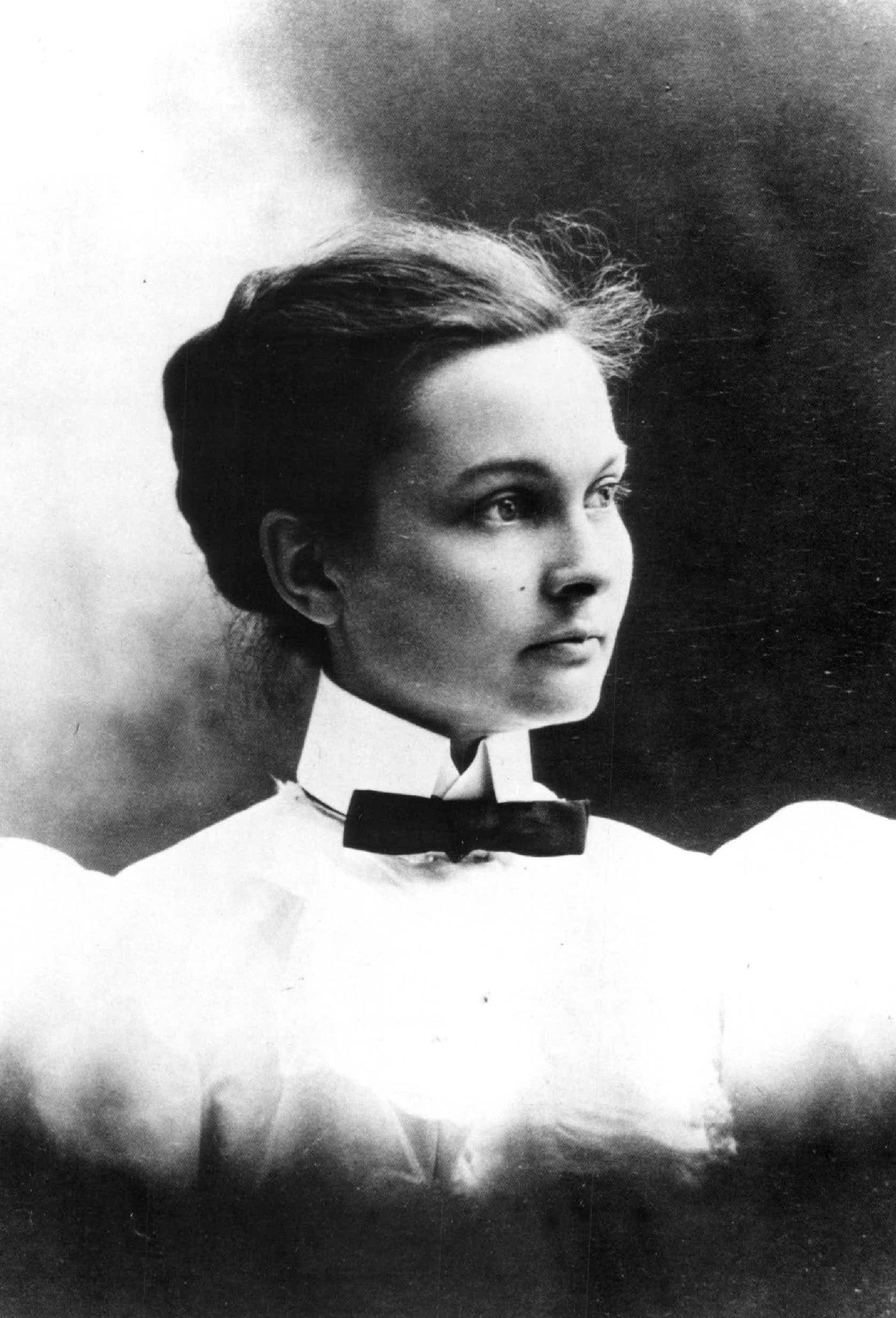
- Born: January 31, 1870; Fort Wayne, Indiana, US
- Died: April 16, 1960 (aged 90); Denver, Colorado, US
- Education: University of Michigan
- Medical career
- Profession: Physician

Susan Anderson (January 31, 1870 – April 16, 1960) was an American physician and one of the first women to practice medicine in Colorado.

== Biography ==
Anderson was born in 1870 in Fort Wayne, Indiana, and later moved to Kansas. Her parents divorced when she was young, and she lived with her father, younger brother, and grandmother. After she graduated from high school in 1891, her family moved to Cripple Creek, Colorado after gold had been discovered there. Although she originally wanted to work as a telegraph operator, she was encouraged by her father to attend medical school at the University of Michigan.

Anderson became a licensed physician after graduating from medical school in 1897. She returned to Cripple Creek before moving around Colorado in attempt to practice in Denver, Greeley and Eaton, but found it difficult to find work. She was briefly engaged but was left at the altar by her fiancé in 1900. In 1904, she was appointed Coroner of Grand County, Colorado, during which time she investigated many of the deaths involved in the construction of the Moffat Tunnel railroad.

After contracting tuberculosis in 1907, Anderson relocated to Fraser, Colorado, where residents affectionately nicknamed her "Doc Susie"; for 49 years, she was the only physician in Fraser. She tended to a range of patients and medical conditions including childbirth, skiing injuries, and particularly pneumonia during the 1918 flu pandemic. Although most of her work involved making house calls to patients, Anderson never owned a horse or car, and she was usually paid in food or firewood rather than money.

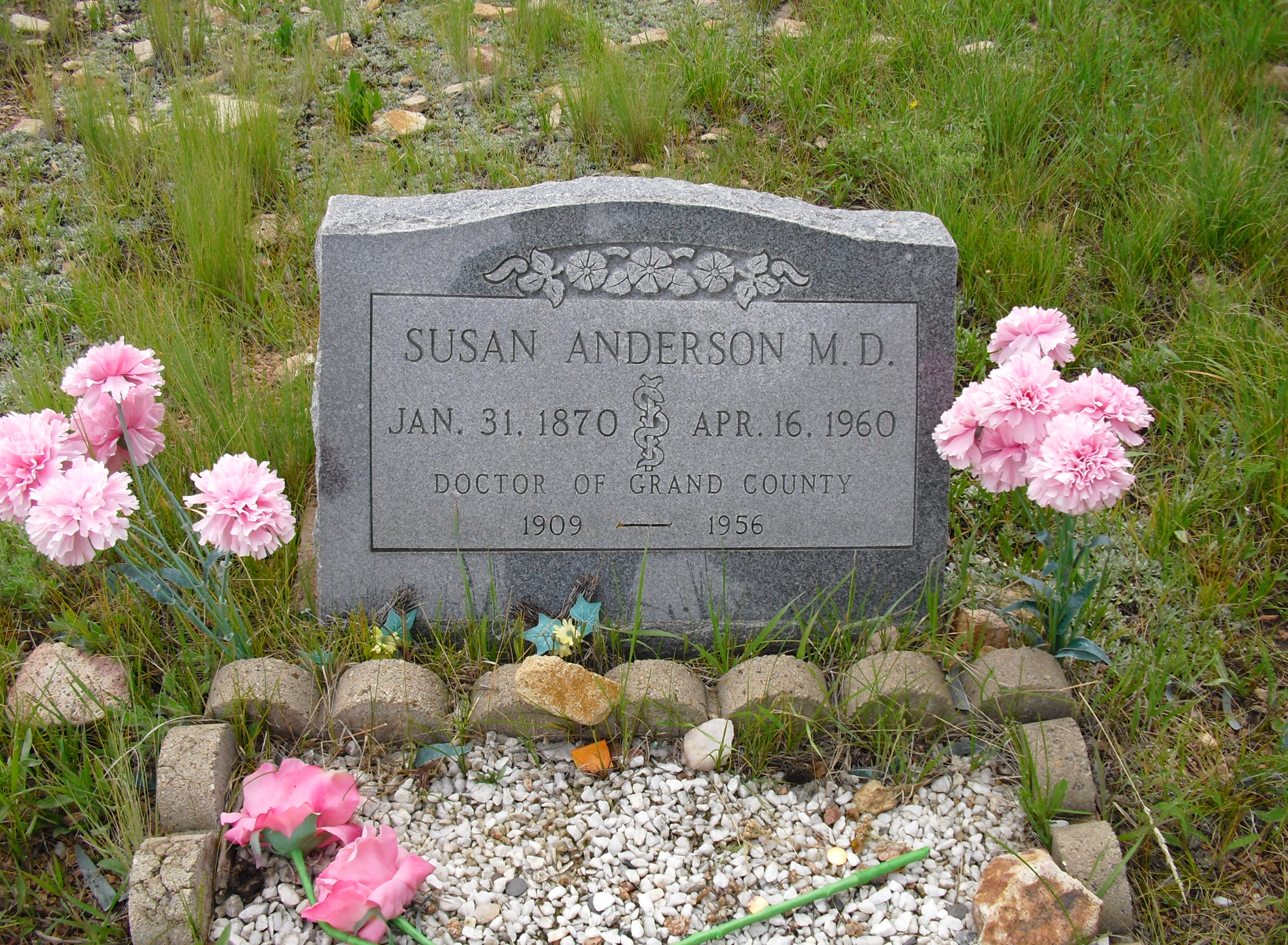
Her grave in Mount Pisgah Cemetery (Cripple Creek, Colorado)

During the 1950s, Anderson was the focus of several newspaper and magazine stories. Actress Ethel Barrymore offered to make a film about Anderson's life, but the latter declined. Anderson retired in 1956 and was admitted to Denver General Hospital with poor health in 1958, where she stayed until her death; she died in 1960, aged 90, and was buried in Cripple Creek.

Anderson was inducted into the Colorado Women's Hall of Fame in 1997.

There are unsubstantiated claims that the television character hero of Dr. Quinn, Medicine Woman is based on Doc Susie.
