= The Cowboy Way (TV series) =

- Genre: Reality series; Western
- Country of origin: United States
- Original language: English
- No. of seasons: 7
- No. of episodes: 67

Production
- Executive producers: Andrew Glassman; Aaron Long; Larissa AK Matsson
- Production location: Alabama
- Running time: 43 minutes

Original release
- Network: INSP
- Release: January 17, 2016 – October 14, 2020

The Cowboy Way is an INSP original reality series, filmed in Alabama. It originally aired on the INSP TV network in the US. After its linear run, it was available for streaming on Amazon Prime from July 16, 2016. In November 2019, Roku made the first five seasons available on its streaming platform.

In July 2020, it was renewed for a seventh season, and would contain 12 episodes.

== Plot ==
The reality series follows three modern-day cowboys, Bubba, Cody and Booger in Alabama. The series follows the three building their cattle business, herding cattle and breaking horses. It follows the strict codes of practice, passed down from the days of the Old West.

== Main cast ==
- Bubba Thompson as himself
- Cody Harris as himself
- Booger Brown as himself

== Episodes ==
Series	Episodes	Originally released	
Series	Episodes	First released	Last released
1	10	17 January 2016	7 December 2017
2	8	4 January 2018	22 February 2018
3	9	26 April 2018	21 June 2018
4	10	26 August 2018	23 December 2018
5	9	6 January 2019	3 March 2019
6	9	5 February 2020	1 April 2020
7	12	29 July 2020	14 October 2020

=== Season 1 (2016-2017) ===
No. overall	No. in season	Title	Original release date
1	1	"Bubba, Cody and Booger"	January 17, 2016
Another busy week starts for the Alabama cowboys. Cody tries to carry on after selling his prized horse, Booger mulls over a job opportunity in Texas, while Bubba tries to get his house ready for his fiancée.
2	2	"An American Tradition"	August 10, 2017
Faith Cattle Company's cowboys take safety risks removing a rogue bull from the herd. A newborn is on the way for Bubba and Kaley, will Cody's rodeo be successful, and Booger attempts to tame a wild horse.
3	3	"Midnight Cowboys"	August 17, 2017
A young horse ends up on a nearby baseball field, and the three cowboys are called in to rope them. A surprise office job offer comes Bubba's way, Cody looks at the possibility of a new home, and Booger teaches a new recruit about being a cowboy.
4	4	"The Friend Zone"	August 24, 2017
A delivery doesn't arrive as planned after the truck gets stuck in a ditch. Booger goes on a date with friend Ashley, Cody's dream home requires him to sell a horse, and Bubba considers launching a new business after building a custom grill.
5	5	"Is It a Boy or a Girl?"	August 31, 2017
A prized young horse goes missing, the guys search for him before it is injured. Booger looks online for a date, Bubba's horse is rushed to the vet after becoming sick, and Cody finds out the gender of his baby.
6	6	"Misty Makes a Match"	September 7, 2017
Its a busy week for the three cowboys, after they're called to capture a wild hog causing problems for a neighbor. Cody and Misty consider baby names, and Booger finds himself on a blind date after Misty arranges it.
7	7	"Frost Moves In"	September 14, 2017
The guys need new heavy machinery to plant winter grass. Bubba helps out a neighbor so that he can use his tractor for the grass, Booger's relationship starts to get serious, and Cody's plans for his home move a step forward.
8	8	"An Extra Hand"	September 21, 2017
The three cowboys need a new ranch hand and begin their search. Bubba takes time off and takes a trip to visit Kaley's family in Mississippi. Booger makes a last-ditch effort to save family land.
9	9	"New Beginnings"	September 28, 2017
Bubba welcomes his baby girl into the world after Kaley gives birth, Cody is given a week to complete a job for a local rancher, and Booger introduces his new girlfriend to grandma. The who gang is introduced to Andie.
10	10	"The Cowboy Way: Season Round Up"	December 7, 2017
The first season finishes with a special episode to bring you the best of Bubba, Cody and Booger from season one. From their personal lives, to the cattle ranch, the finale gives an in-depth look into the lives of the three cowboys.

=== Season 2 (2018) ===
No. overall	No. in season	Title	Original release date
11	1	"Bubba, Cody and Booger: Back in the Saddle"	January 4, 2018
Bubba, Cody and Booger undertake a huge cattle drive in Mississippi. A bet is wagered between Bubba and Kaley, Misty suffers an accident trying to help Cody, while Booger considers whether his should propose to his girlfriend.
12	2	"Put a Ring on It"	January 11, 2018
An infection in one of the cows could threaten the entire heard. Misty moves into the cattle business, Bubba gets a dose of tough love when dealign with his in-laws, while Booger professes his love to Jaclyn.
13	3	"Tradition vs. Technology"	January 18, 2018
After a struggle to round up the herd, could GPS come to the rescue for Cody. Jaclyn goes shopping for a perfect wedding dress, Bubba thinks about a crash diet to get into his tux, and Cody writes a song for the wedding.
14	4	"Bulls on the Beach"	January 25, 2018
After an injury on the job, Cody must overcome issues to pull off his annual rodeo event, Bulls on the Beach. Bubba helps out at his father-in-law's company in Mississippi. Wedding preparations are Booger and Jaclyn's focus.
15	5	"Saddle Up or Settle Down?"	February 1, 2018
A dangerous cow is removed from a nearby rancher's herd. Bubba continues to work alongside his father-in-law and is rewarded for his efforts. Misty and Cody negotiate over a range horse, and wedding planning leads to tension for Booger and Jaclyn.
16	6	"Tying the Knot"	February 8, 2018
A rogue cow ends up in a pond, Booger and Cody come to the rescue. Bubba's father-in-law makes him a job offer, Misty has a hard time negotiating buying cows for her business, and its Boogers wedding day.
17	7	"All for One or One for Himself"	February 15, 2018
A romantic honeymoon for the newly wed couple, Booger and Jaclyn. Misty and Cody contemplate becoming business partners. Its Bubba's wedding anniversary, and tensions in Mississippi while Bubba mulls over the job offer from his father-in-law.
18	8	"Happy Trails"	February 22, 2018
Bubba reveals to the guys that he is taking a new job. Cody proves to everyone he can predict the weather, Booger give the weather forecast on the news. Bubba and Kaley host a cookout to bid farewell to Bubba.

=== Season 3 (2018) ===
No. overall	No. in season	Title	Original release date
19	1	"My Heart’s in Alabama"	April 26, 2018
The trio reunite in Alabama to help with a cattle drive. Cody's rodeo contract is in jeopardy after hitting problems. Jaclyn and Booger turn his bachelor pad into a family home and Bubba admits he's missing Alabama.
20	2	"There’s No Place Like Home"	May 3, 2018
A rogue cow ends up in a fishing role, which Booger and Cody deal with. Misty holds a tasting party for her beef, Booger looks at becoming a family man. Bubba moves back to Alabama, with Kaley staying in Mississippi.
21	3	"Man Down"	May 10, 2018
Bubba is back, but suffers an injury on his first day back in Alabama. Misty gives a gift to Cody and Carter, Booger hopes some wild cows can make him some quick money, and the trio consider a new restaurant concept.
22	4	"Filet of Dreams"	May 17, 2018
Bubba has a broken sacrum and looks into acupuncture to heal his injury. Misty has problems with stillborn calves, but thinks she's found out why. Booger spends time with Matthew one-on-one. A skeptical restaurant owner listens to the pitch from the cowboys for their new restaurant concept.
23	5	"True Grits"	May 24, 2018
Bubba, Cody and Booger need help so begin the hunt for a secretary. Bubba and Kaley make birthday plans, Booger tries to repurchase his family land, and while there is excitement about the new restaurant, the chef doesn't like the dishes.
24	6	"Man Up"	May 31, 2018
The cowboys help deal with dangerous cattle on another rancher's property. Booger begins to train a new colt, Chef Bill insists more training is needed before opening the restaurant and Misty gets some assistance with her new cattle pens.
25	7	"Horse of a Different Color"	June 7, 2018
A young polo player challenges Booger's horsemanship. Cody's grandfather gets his favourite fishing hole cleaned. Bubba and Kaley watch Andie take her first steps. Chef Bill is convinced to return to the restaurant.
26	8	"Aged to Perfection"	June 14, 2018
Booger has a surprise for his grandma on her 85th birthday, the cowboys get a reality check when they open the pop-up steakhouse restaurant. It becomes a wild ride when there are more customers than they anticipated.
27	9	"On a Mission"	June 21, 2018
With the restaurant a fading memory, the cowboys start to think about finding partners for the ranch hands, Frankie and Hodge. Bubba and Cody help Booger with his horse clinic.

=== Season 4 (2018) ===
No. overall	No. in season	Title	Original release date
28	1	"Big Deal"	August 26, 2018
A multi-million dollar cattle deal comes the way of the cowboys. Booger's family struggles with an overwhelming work schedule, Misty teaches kids about cattle and roles are reversed as Bubba teaches his father-in-law about cowboys.
29	2	"New Sheriff in Town"	September 2, 2018
The trio take on one last job before signing a lucrative deal. Bubba plans for Andie's future, Booger celebrates Matthew's birthday and Cody befriends a young autistic boy.
30	3	"A New Chapter"	September 9, 2018
The trio begin to process hundreds of cattle as part of their new deal. Bubba and Kaley call in favours, Booger and Jaclyn worry about her job situation, Cody decides to write a book about the values of being a cowboy.
31	4	"Keep on Chuckin’"	September 16, 2018
Cody and Booger enter a chuck wagon race, but Bubba refuses to join them. Ranch duties are handled by the wives while they're away. Jaclyn worries when she is told how dangerous the race can be.
32	5	"Getting Schooled"	September 23, 2018
The cowboys hit a problem when the cattle venture onto a neighbors land. Cody's brother-in-law checks in to look at Misty's herd. Bubba worries about the cattle industry, while Booger tries cattle auctioneering.
33	6	"Keep on Truckin’"	September 30, 2018
The trio go to Louisiana in search of a bull, with some memorable stops along the way. Cody and Bubba's patience wears thin with Booger during the journey. The wives spend some time together.
34	7	"Cajun Persuasion"	October 7, 2018
The cowboys look into airboats to herd cattle. Booger helps Matthew learn to play T-Ball. Cody researches his family tree to see if he, Booger and Cody are related. Bubba and Kaley host a river outing.
35	8	"Get Off My Lawn!"	October 14, 2018
Cows from the herd end up on a mobile home park, leading to the cowboys getting an earful. It's Cody and Misty's anniversary, Booger and Jaclyn search for a new home, while Bubba is contacted by a potential buyer.
36	9	"Done Deal"	October 21, 2018
The cowboys rush to help when called upon, Misty plans a launch party for an upcoming book, Jaclyn helps renovate a family porch. The guys secure a big cattle deal, and all are invited to the annual Cattlemen’s Association Ball.
37	19	"The Three Wise Cattleman"	December 23, 2018
The season finale ends during the holiday season, for the guys its calving season. Bubba, Cody and Booger work long hours to monitor the health of the herd. Problems mean the trio nearly miss their annual holiday party.

=== Season 5 (2019) ===
No. overall	No. in season	Title	Original release date
38	1	"Don’t Mess with Texas"	January 13, 2019
A trip to Texas is planned for the cowboys to broker their first cattle deal. Cody decides it is time for his own rodeo. Bubba and Kaley take a struggling cowboy in, Booger and Jaclyn start the hunt for a piece of land.
39	2	"New Sheriff in Town"	January 13, 2019
The trio take on one last job before signing a lucrative deal. Bubba plans for Andie's future, Booger celebrates Matthew's birthday and Cody befriends a young autistic boy.
40	3	"Crazy Rich Texans"	January 20, 2019
The guys work to make new friends in Texas, and a promising deal fails to materialise. Kaley is left to deal with her cowboy houseguest, Misty considers barrel racing, and Jaclyn is left in charge of the ranch.
41	4	"Cash Cows"	January 27, 2019
A two-day cattle drive in Texas is the cowboys focus. Misty continues to train a mare for the rodeo, Jaclyn and Matthew are in charge while Booger is out of town, Kaley's houseguest continues to cause problems.
42	5	"The Fall of Booger"	February 3, 2019
What looked a simple job for Booger turns dangerous when he and his horse have a bad fall. The trio close their first deal in Texas, Booger and Matthew search for the perfect anniversary gift.
43	6	"Storm’s A-Brewin"	February 10, 2019
A lead comes the trio's way in Texas, but its threatened when a hurricane is forecast. The whole gang tries to prepare for the storm. After it passes, the cowboys prioritize helping the community recover.
44	7	"Horsing Around"	February 17, 2019
Another set of cattle are planned for the company, but issues put it in jeopardy. Cody prepares for his rodeo, and Misty decides its time for a new horse. The live-in cowboy has his family come to visit, meaning its a full house.
45	8	"Kiddie Corral"	February 24, 2019
The cattle deal falls through, meaning the cowboys have to auction off unwanted cattle. Booger is tasked with the responsibility of looking after Andie, so Bubba and Kaley can spend some time away. Cody hunts to find an announcer for the rodeo.
46	9	"Ride ‘Em High"	March 3, 2019
A group of investors come calling, meaning the cowboys fly to Texas to meet with them. Cody impresses after his first rodeo, Misty has another go at barrel racing. The season finale concludes celebrating the cowboys' successes as cattlemen.

=== Season 6 (2020) ===
No. overall	No. in season	Title	Original release date
47	1	"Drone’T Knock It ‘Til You Try It"	February 5, 2020
A unique job opportunity in Texas gives the cowboys ideas for their next business venture. Bubba is stressed about coming up with a plan, Cody attempts to modernize, while Booger gets an unexpected opportunity.
48	2	"Obstacle Horse, of Course of Course"	February 12, 2019
The cowboys find day-work in Texas but struggle to figure out their next business venture. Bubba considers a career move. Cody formulates a new idea. Booger starts training for Road to the Horse and the families come together to help Booger prepare.
49	3	"Unsaddled and Unraveled"	February 19, 2020
Booger continues to train for his competition, but Bubba and Cody are surprised to learn he will be going to Austin to train with a pro. Cody speaks about his cow sale idea, but few are positive about it. Tension builds between everyone.
50	4	"Buckskin for the Win!"	February 26, 2020
While business is slow, the guys take on additional work to make ends meet. Cody is urged to go ahead with the cow sale by Misty. Bubba gets a business opportunity, while Booger faces a challenge.
51	5	"Buck Up, Cowboy"	March 4, 2020
Bubba and Booger are out of town, Cody tries to balance the ranch and cow sale. Bubba tells his in-laws about a job opportunity, and Booger makes a hard decision during his horse training.
52	6	"Partnership Hits the Fan"	March 11, 2020
When volunteering for the community, Cody secures a new buyer for his cow sale. Bubba learns about grass fed cattle, Bother gets a horse training offer. Emotions spill over as tension between the cowboys continues.
53	7	"Friends or Foes?"	March 18, 2020
Following the tension between the trio, they take a break from the partnership. Cody secures buyers, while Bubba heads north to meet with organic investors. Jaclyn pushes for the guys to resolve their differences.
54	8	"Friends ‘Til the End"	March 25, 2020
Cody secures the cattle deal, but at a price. Bubba goes back over previous ground, Booger heads to Austin to add English-style to his training. The guys make amends and consider an offer from Texas.
55	9	"A Pea in the Pod"	April 1, 2020
Cody works alongside Misty to conclude a successful sale. Bubba's organic idea fails to deliver, Booger is again back in Austin, taking Jaclyn and Matthew with him. A cattle drive in Texas for the trio brings surprises.

=== Season 7 (2020) ===
No. overall	No. in season	Title	Original release date
56	1	"Saddle Up, Partner"	July 29, 2020
Roping skills are tested when the cowboys are asked to help out catching wild hogs. A gender reveal party for Bubba and Kaley, while Booger looks for opportunities in Florida. Cody and Misty start to think about a new home.
57	2	"Trigger Happy"	August 5, 2020
A round up in South Florida leads to a new venture for the trio. Bubba is on hand to provide strange food for Kaley's pregnancy cravings. Misty's health has Cody worried, Booger and family say goodbye to Matthew's pony.
58	3	"This Is My First Rodeo!"	August 12, 2020
A broken fence interrupts plans to house a new herd during the winter months. Bubba creates a stall to protect his horse, Misty has surgery, while Booger gets Matthew ready for his first rodeo.
59	4	"A Dying Breed"	August 19, 2020
After heading back to Florida, the cowboys carry out an overnight cattle drive for an old family friend. Booger considers leading his own cattle drives, Kaley misses Bubba while he's away. Cody and Misty throw a party.
60	5	"Another Man’s Treasure"	August 26, 2020
An unruly herd nearby has the cowboys coming to their neighbor's aid. The cows are uncooperative, meaning a return visit once the cattle settles. Bubba invests in horses, Booger plans an old-fashioned community cattle drive.
61	6	"Keep Them Doggies Rollin’"	September 2, 2020
Another attempt is made to round up the unruly herd. Everyone gets on-board for Booger's old-fashion cattle drive through the middle of town. Grandma gives the wives a lesson in cowgirl cooking.
62	7	"Northern Exposure"	September 9, 2020
The cowboys make connections with Alabama, partnering with a successful rancher. Misty mentors a barrel racer. Bubba looks at training new horses to try and make a profit. Booger cooks up something special for grandma.
63	8	"Gator Raid"	September 16, 2020
With herds across two states, the cowboys split to manage the workload. Booger and Bubba find a predator in Florida causing them problems, and Cody processes a cattle shipment in Alabama. Matthew needs help with his school science project.
64	9	"Specialty Sales and Recipe Fails"	September 23, 2020
The cowboys round up the cattle, ready to be shipped to South Florida Cody can't decide whether to hold a special cattle sale. Bubba finds a buyer that could prove lucrative. Booger and Jaclyn attempt to recreate family recipes.
65	10	"Generations to Come"	September 30, 2020
Booger and Bubba attempt to keep things moving while Cody concentrates on his cattle sale. The barn is full of buyers, but will Cody make any sales? A room is renovated ready for the new arrival. Booger adds stories to the family cookbook.
66	11	"Lett It Ripp"	October 7, 2020
Skills are tested when equipment failure causes problems with a cattle shipment. Booger enters a local competition, Cody organizes a campout, with everyone celebrating at the baby shower.
67	12	"The Final Cow Down"	October 14, 2020
Following the long drought, the trio can celebrate a successful calving season. Cody purchases a high-value bull for his business, Bubba and Kaley welcome a new baby boy, Booger completes Grandma's cookbook.
