= William Thomas Hamilton (frontiersman) =

American frontiersman and author

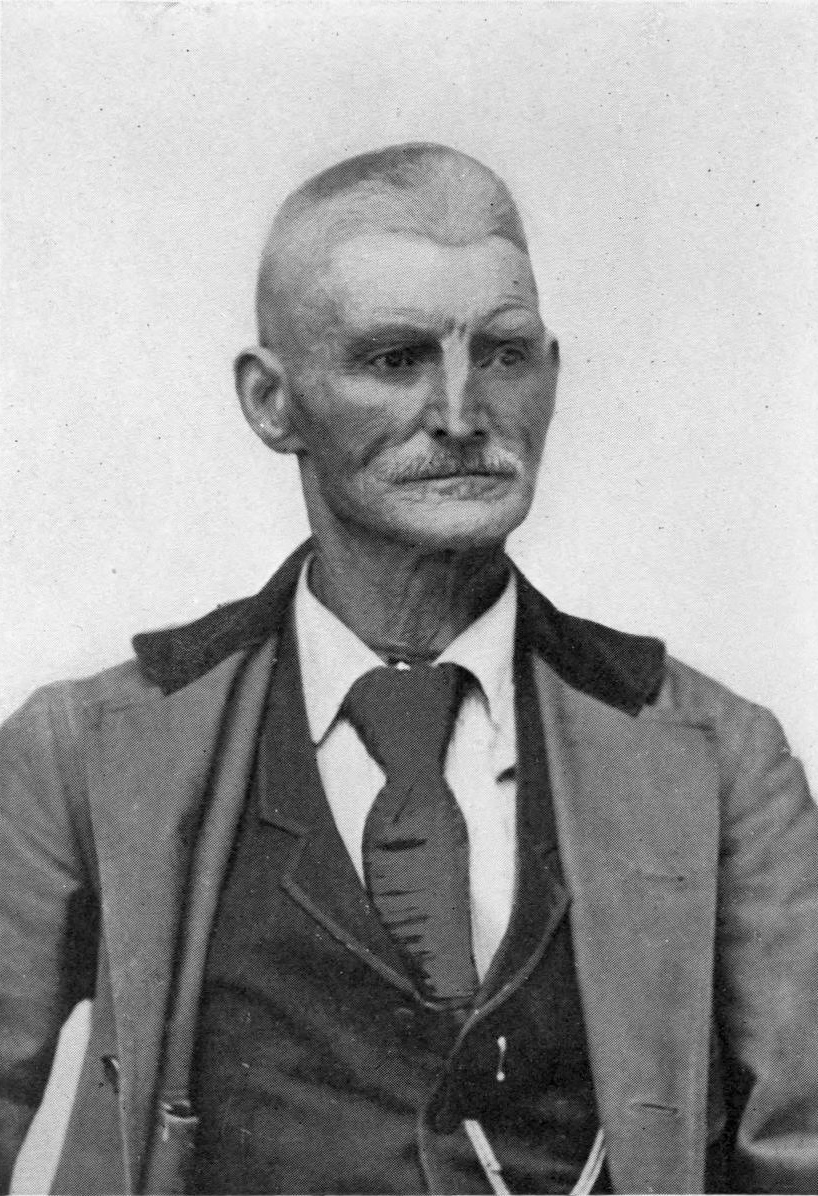
William T. Hamilton

William Thomas Hamilton (December 6, 1822 – May 24, 1908), also known as Wildcat Bill, was an American frontiersman and author of Scottish and English heritage.

== Early life ==
His gravestone and obituaries indicated that William T. Hamilton was born on December 6, 1822, and the 1900 Census agrees he was born in December 1822. According to his autobiography, he was born on the River Till in the Cheviot Hills of Scotland. However, while the Cheviot Hills straddle northeastern England and the Scottish borderlands, the River Till is entirely in Northumberland, England, being the major tributary of the River Tweed which forms the eastern border of England and Scotland. The 1900 Census indicates he was born in England, while his father was born in Scotland and his mother in England, but possible census entries for William Hamilton in 1870 and 1880 indicate he was born in Scotland. Some undocumented family trees claim that William was the son of Alexander and Margaret Hamilton, but this is not clear.

In his autobiography, My Sixty Years on the Plains, published in 1905, William wrote that he was the youngest child with older brothers, but does not name his parents or siblings. His family was among a company of 25 Scottish partners who determined to leave Scotland for either India or America, with a vote determining which. His paternal uncle (described as the "captain" of the company, but also not identified by name) cast the tie-breaking vote to go to America. William wrote that he was two years and eleven months old (hence, about October 1825) when the ship arrived at New Orleans, Louisiana. After traveling around the United States, his family settled in St. Louis, Missouri where he was raised and attended school for five years. The son of financially comfortable parents, he grew up on a farm and learned to shoot a weapon and ride a horse.

After first venturing west about 1843, he returned home to Saint Louis after a couple years for a short time, and again in the spring of 1848, at which time his parents were living, but they died within the year. His autobiography indicates that he never saw any members of his immediate family again.

== Career ==
In the death of "Uncle Billy" Hamilton the United States loses its greatest Indian fighter and most skillful Indian sign talker and sign reader that this country ever produced.
Few men had the adventurous career that was Hamilton's, although because of a modesty that rarely permitted him to talk of himself, comparatively few persons knew his record on the plains.

— "Hero of Many Battles Dead". The Butte Daily Post. May 26, 1908.

Along with Old Bill Williams, Hamilton worked and was friends of John Bozeman and Jim Bridger. He has been described as a mountain man, trapper, and scout of the American West, living in the mountains for more than 50 years. He was given the name Wildcat Bill by Native Americans. He was considered a healer among Native Americans. Also called Sign Man, he excelled in Native American sign language according to Favour.

At the age of 19, in March 1842, Hamilton left Missouri for the Rocky Mountains to improve his health with Old Bill Williams, whom he worked with and became a companion. He was a trapper and trader for six years. His father bought a third interest in the trapping enterprise led by Williams. With the California Gold Rush, he moved in 1848 to Hangtown (now Placerville), California, where he married and had a child. In 1851, both his wife and child died.

After protecting miners from Native Americans with the Buckskin Rangers in California, Hamilton worked for the government protecting pioneers from Native Americans in Nevada, Oregon and Montana and was a scout for George Armstrong Custer from the 1850s through the 1870s. During that time period, he also worked as a trader at Fort Benton, around Flathead Lake, and during the winter of 1858-1859 he established a trading post just west of Rattlesnake Creek where it joins the Clark Fork River, being the first cabin built at what would become Missoula. He also served as the sheriff of Chouteau County, Montana, and then as a U.S. Marshal in 1869. Continuing his work for the government, he worked with the Blackfoot People in 1873. Three years later he served under General George Crook and fought the Sioux in the Great Sioux War of 1876.

Hamilton lived many years in Montana and trapped and hunted throughout the Yellowstone area. In Montana Territory and state, he was commonly known as "Uncle Billy." He later assisted the Smithsonian Institution in translating hundreds of Native American signs and pictographs painted on the cliffs along Lake Flathead near present-day Lakeside, Montana.

In his later years, he was a guide and hunter. The 1900 U.S. Census enumerated William T. Hamilton, age 77, widower, in Stillwater, Carbon County, Montana, and recorded his occupation as Quartz Miner (indicating a miner who typically mined gold from lode deposits rather than from placer deposits). Hamilton lived in Columbus, Montana by 1903 when he was one of the co-founders of the Pioneers of Eastern Montana.

== Death ==
He died of stomach cancer on May 24, 1908, in a hospital in Billings, Montana and was buried in Columbus, Montana.

== Bibliography ==
His autobiographical writings include:

- My sixty years on the plains: trapping, trading, and Indian fighting. Forest and Stream Pub. Co. 1905.
- Spying on the Blackfoot: A Mountain Man's Secret Mission Across the Rockies Into Blackfoot Country (1900)

== See also ==
- American Indian Wars
