= Leonard J. Cerullo =

Leonard J. Cerullo (born June 1944- January 16, 2024) was a board-certified neurosurgeon and founder/medical director.

== Early life and education ==
Cerullo was born in Hazleton, Pennsylvania in June 1944. He was the middle child of the large family of Leornard Frank Cerullo, an electrical contractor, and Marion née Yori, a nurse; his parents met at Hazleton General Hospital.

Cerullo graduated from Georgetown University in 1966, majoring in English and minoring in philosophy. He spent the following summer studying Japanese literature in Japan. He began his medical career as a student at Jefferson Medical College in Philadelphia, Pennsylvania, earning his M.D. in 1970. Upon completion of the M.D., Cerullo moved to Chicago to begin post-graduate neurosurgery medical training at Northwestern University. Under the direction of Paul C. Bucy and Anthony J. Raimondi, he was awarded an MS in surgery.

Cerullo earned a specialty certification in neurological surgery in 1979, granted by The American Board of Neurological Surgery.

== Career ==
Cerullo served on the faculty at Northwestern University Medical School, under an Associate Professor of Neurosurgery appointment, later serving as Acting Chief of Neurosurgery from 1984 through 1986.

Additionally, he served as co-medical director of the Neurologic & Orthopedic Hospital of Chicago (NOHC), founded in 2003 and formerly known as the Neurologic & Orthopedic Institute of Chicago. Cerullo also served as a professor of Neurosurgery at Rush Medical College.

In 1987, Cerullo founded CINN and in 1998, he joined Rush Medical College. In 1999, he was named Professor and Chairman of the Department of Neurosurgery at Rush University Medical School in Chicago. Notable patients he has treated include Chicago TV personalities Tim Weigel and Theresa Gutierrez. He has been featured repeatedly in Chicago Magazine's “Top Doctors” special issues in lists prepared by Castle Connolly.

Cerullo is most noted for helping people with neck and back pain. In 1989 he pioneered use of the Gamma Knife in the Midwest for minimally invasive treatment of brain tumors with focused radiation therapy. One of the first neurosurgeons to embrace Gamma Knife surgery, he helped to promote its widespread use.

He was elected to the Society of Neurological Surgeons in 2001, and is an active member as of 2008.

In 2017 he opened a clinic in Chicago focussing on chronic pain.
