= Morris Cerullo =

American televangelist (1931–2020)

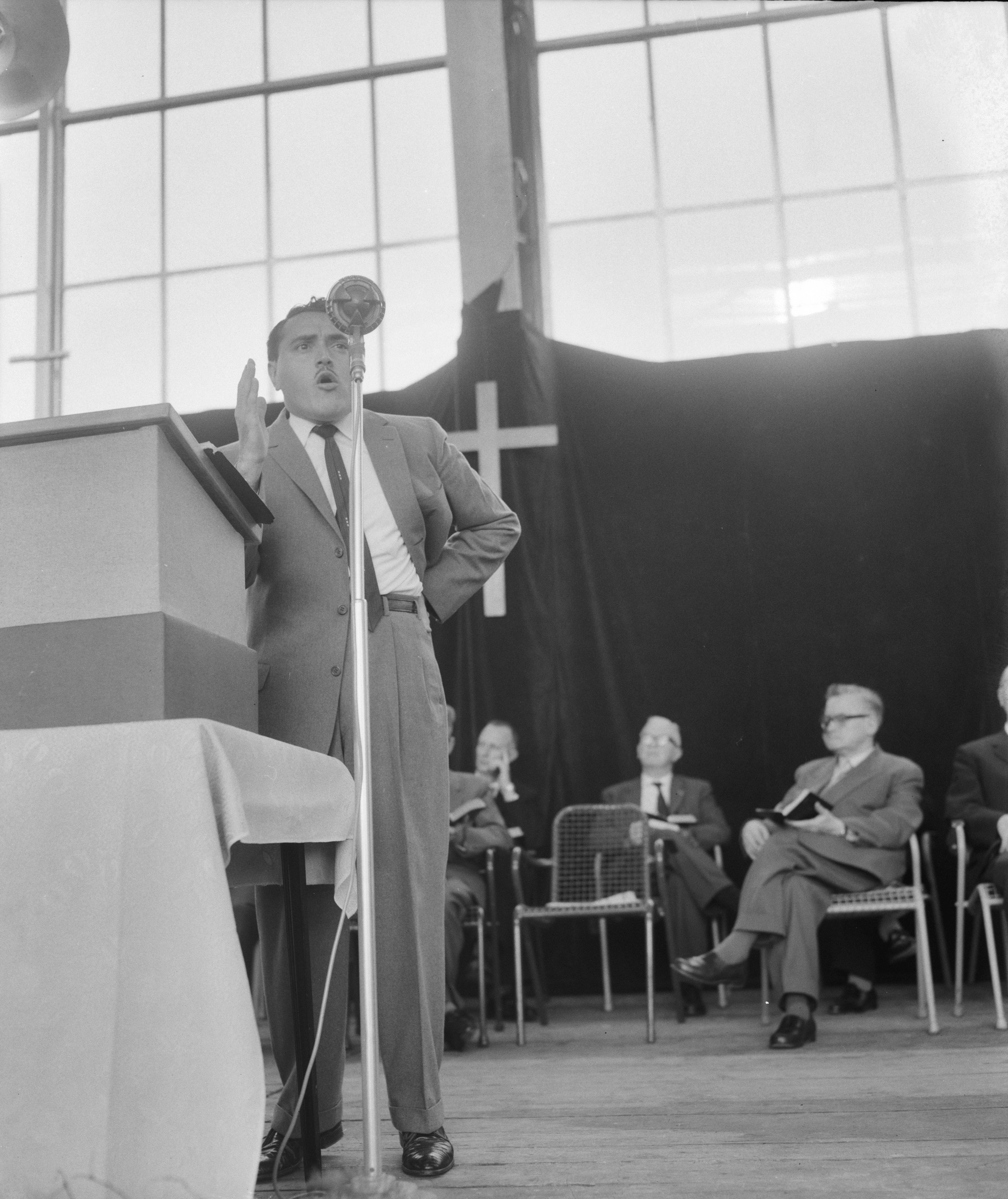
- Morris Cerullo preaching in the Apollo hall, Amsterdam
- Born: October 2, 1931; Passaic, New Jersey, US
- Died: July 10, 2020 (aged 88); San Diego, California, US
- Other name: Dr. Morris Cerullo
- Occupations: Evangelist, inspirational speaker, missionary, author,
- Spouse: Theresa (m.1951)
- Children: David (b. 1952); Susan (b. 1954); Mark (b. 1957–1993)

Ecclesiastical career
- Religion: Judaism, then Pentecostalism
- Church: Christianity (Pentecostal)
- Offices held: Founder, Morris Cerullo World Evangelism; Founder, Morris Cerullo Schools of Ministry
- Website: https://mcwe.com/

Morris Cerullo (October 2, 1931 – July 10, 2020) was an American Pentecostal evangelist. He traveled extensively around the world for his ministry. He hosted Victory Today, a daily television program, and published more than 80 books.

Cerrullo bought the assets of Jim Bakker's PTL ministry in 1990 including The Inspiration Network cable television network. He was the subject of criticism for some of his fundraising efforts, and for claims made on television programmes, particularly in the UK, regarding his healing ministry.

== Early life and family ==
=== Early life ===
Cerullo was born in Passaic, New Jersey, to an Italian father and a Russian Jewish mother. His mother committed suicide when he was very young and his father died of a stroke at age 62. He was raised in various orphanages, the last being an Orthodox Jewish orphanage in nearby Clifton, New Jersey. He converted to Christianity at age 14 with the guidance of a nurse in the Clifton orphanage. Soon after, Jewish orphanage directors restricted him from practicing certain matters of his new faith, so he ran away from the orphanage. He began preaching the gospel at the age of 16, after claiming to have seen a vision from God, in which he witnessed people suffering torments in Hell. He attended and graduated from divinity school in New York state in 1953, and began ministering with the help of his then soon-to-be bride, Theresa. In the early 1950s, he was ordained in the Assemblies of God.

=== Family ===
The Cerullos are the parents of three children, David (b. 1952), Susan (b. 1954) and Mark (b. 1957). At the time of his death, he had 7 grandchildren and 9 great-grandchildren.

=== Siblings ===
Morris had one brother, Abe Cerullo and three sisters, Pauline Cerullo (Frenchko), Frances Cerullo and Beatrice Cerullo.

=== Half Siblings ===
Morris also had two half brothers, Richard Cerullo and Albert Cerullo, and three half sisters, Dolores Cerullo (Stricchiola), Helen Cerullo (Pickel) and Lilian Cerullo (Mozer) born when his father, Joseph Cerullo remarried to Josephine Kastella after the death of his mother.

== Ministry ==
For many years Morris Cerullo conducted repeated "Schools of Ministry" in several countries like Mexico, Brazil, the Philippines, Korea, Zimbabwe, South Africa, Kenya, Nigeria, Indonesia, the Netherlands and many others. During these "SOMs" one of the days of the conferences he would preach in an open air crusade, or a large theater/arena, and lead people in a commitment to Jesus Christ and then would pray for healings to happen in the crowd. He would have the school of ministry students test the genuineness of the reports from the people's testimonies. After the large mass meetings he would charge the "SOM," School Of Ministry, students to reach out to their countrymen with the same message being inspired by the results of the public rally. Cerullo often stated that not he, but Jesus Christ was the healer. He would encourage faith in, as he would say, "the written and the living word of God."

=== Heritage USA ===
In 1990, Cerullo purchased, from the United States Federal Bankruptcy Court in Columbia, South Carolina, the assets of Jim Bakker's bankrupt ministry, PTL. These assets included the Heritage USA Christian theme park in Fort Mill, South Carolina, which he purchased in partnership with Malayan United Industries (Berhad). After a dispute with his business partners over his issuance of discount cards to the theme park, the Malaysian entity bought out Cerullo's interest in Heritage USA.

=== The Inspiration Network (INSP) ===
As a part of his agreement to purchase Heritage USA, the bankruptcy court also approved Cerullo's $7 million offer to purchase PTL's cable television network, The Inspiration Network, which was renamed INSP-The Inspiration Network and transferred into a new, separate entity, The Inspiration Networks. Cerullo's son, David, has served as the corporation's president and CEO, and as a member of its board of directors since its formation. In 2005 he was elected to serve as its chairman. The organization, located in Charlotte, North Carolina, is currently building a new multi-million dollar broadcast headquarters facility known as "CrossRidge" in Lancaster County, South Carolina. This was opened on March 1, 2009. Cerullo and his son David were both featured in a 2009 Charlotte Observer article.

Cerullo still travelled as a missionary, and in the 2014 World Conference, he stated that God told him that "Prophets never retire!". In 2015, at the age of 83, Cerullo toured Africa for nine days, during which time he held meetings in six African countries, preaching, holding training sessions and meeting with political leaders.

== Death ==
Cerullo died from pneumonia and on July 11, 2020, at the age of 88.

== Controversy ==
=== General ===
Cerullo is considered by some critics to be controversial, with concerns having been raised about his financial practices. He was indicted for income tax evasion in California. Those charges were dismissed by the court.

As a Christian of partially Jewish origin, he carried a few evangelistic campaigns targeted at the Jewish community, drawing some condemnation from anti-missionary organizations and claims of deceptive practices.

While no charges were brought against Cerullo's ministry, Cerullo was found to have underrepresented his income for 1998 through 2000. However, on August 8, 2007, the US District Court, Southern District of California ordered that the indictment be dismissed as a consequence of the prosecutor's inaccurate explanation of the Duberstein test to the jury. An extract from the ruling was published on Cerullo's website.

=== United Kingdom ===
Cerullo's activities in the United Kingdom have attracted considerable critical attention, particularly during the early 1990s.

In 1991, British authorities suspended the license of a satellite station for broadcasting the program, Victory with Morris Cerullo. The license was reinstated after the station agreed to precede the program with the disclaimer, "Morris Cerullo World Evangelism cannot substantiate the claims made by those participants featured in this programme," and advising all persons suffering from illness to seek medical attention.

Following Cerullo's Mission at Earl's Court London in 1992, a documentary on the BBC, Newsround, reported that a lady called Audrey Reynolds stopped taking medication for epilepsy (although she was never instructed or advised to do so by the ministry) after she believed herself to have been healed during Cerullo's rally. She subsequently died following a seizure in her bath. The story was also reported in a Christian newspaper. Another report from this crusade claimed that Cerullo pronounced a four-year-old cancer sufferer to be free from the disease, yet she died from it just two months later.

Cerullo claimed that giving money to send evangelistic booklets to Jewish people would result in family members becoming Christians. Chris Wright, principal of All Nations Christian College, denounced Cerullo's methods as "spiritually perverted and pastorally disastrous". The Chief Rabbi Jonathan Sacks was quoted as being "deeply distressed by missionary tactics specifically targeted against Jews".

Subsequently, Cerullo was challenged on British television to produce his three best examples of claimed miraculous healing for scrutiny by a panel of doctors. Their final report was "there is no evidence that anything has occurred that is outside the realm of normal clinical experience".

On 19 August 1995 Cerullo was interviewed at length by Andrew Neil for his British one-on-one interview show Is This Your Life?, made by Open Media for Channel 4.

In 1996 the Evangelical Alliance considered, but decided against, ejecting Cerullo after the Advertising Standards Authority upheld four complaints against him relating to his claims of being able to offer miraculous healing to the disabled. Cerullo later resigned from the alliance. Following Cerullo's resignation, Britain's then-largest church, Kensington Temple, also left the Alliance in protest.

In 1999, the Christian Channel, a UK cable channel, broadcast an advertisement for one of Cerullo's European rallies which claimed that "Satanic hordes" had "occupied the principal palaces of power." As a result, the channel was fined £20,000 for breaching advertising codes requiring political impartiality, for denigrating other religious beliefs, for potentially frightening viewers, and for making statements prejudicial of "respect for human dignity".

=== India ===
Cerullo was expelled from India in 1992 after disturbances erupted at one of his rallies. The Times of India on October 17, 1992, reported, "A so-called miracle healer, Morris Cerullo, who prefers to call himself a man of God, was declared 'persona non-grata' and bundled out of the country by Calcutta police this morning after mass healing services on Park Circus Maidan yesterday evening turned into a fiasco when members of the crowd stormed the dais challenging the efficacy of his healing power".

=== Brazil ===
In 2009, Cerullo was invited to be a guest in a television show in Brazil. During the interview, he introduced his special financial healing to the televiewers. He asked for 900 Brazilian Reals in order to avail this ‘God’s life-time annointment’. His action was refuted by the overall servant of Members Church of God International (MCGI) Eli Soriano (deceased).

== See also ==
- Faith healing
- Prosperity theology
- Legacy International Center
