= David Cerullo =

American businessman and televangelist

- Born: C. David Cerullo; October 23, 1952 (age 73); Newburgh, New York, U.S.
- Education: Oral Roberts University (BA)
- Occupations: Televangelist, broadcaster, minister, television personality
- Years active: 1974–present
- Spouse: Barbara (m. 1975)
- Children: 2
- Parent: Morris Cerullo
- Church: Christianity (Pentecostal)
- Offices held: CEO, Imagicomm Communications (f/k/a Inspiration Networks) (1990)

C. David Cerullo (born October 23, 1952) is an American Pentecostal minister and televangelist who promotes prosperity theology. Chairman and CEO of Imagicomm Communications, Cerullo is also an entrepreneur and businessman.

== Early life and education ==
The son of international evangelist Morris Cerullo, Cerullo is a graduate of Oral Roberts University with a degree in business administration.

== Ministry ==
=== The Inspiration Networks ===
Under Cerullo's leadership, The Inspiration Networks, which includes INSP, Inspiration Network International (INI), and La Familia Cosmovision, a Spanish-language network for Hispanic families, the combined viewership has reached more than 150 million households across the globe.

The flagship network INSP carries a variety of programming, ranging from ministry programming to such wholesome family classics as The Waltons, Little House on the Prairie, The Virginian, Bonanza, Daniel Boone, and The High Chaparral.

Cerullo's Inspiration Network compensation in 2012 was nearly $1.7 million, with his wife and two children additionally receiving more than $100,000 each, according to a 2013 report by the Chronicle of Philanthropy.

=== Inspiration Campmeeting ===
INSP periodically airs revival specials, known as Inspiration Campmeeting, which also feature evangelists such as Mike Murdock and George Bloomer, and Christian recording artists such as Judy Jacobs, Sandi Patti and Larnelle Harris. Ministry Contributions and prayer requests can also be made during the airing of these specials.

== Entrepreneur and businessman ==
In addition to organizing international business projects, Cerullo founded an advertising and public relations firm, a management consulting firm, and a real estate company that developed and constructed hotels, commercial office buildings, single-family home subdivisions, apartments and retail.

== Criticism ==
Cerullo and family have received criticism due to building a $4 million gated-community home on Lake Keowee in South Carolina. Boasting 9,000 square feet, and one of the most expensive homes in the area, the purchase brought concern from viewers who donated money to the organization.

The home, with 4 bedrooms and 5 full and 3 half baths and located on 1.12 acres in Salem, SC 29676, was subsequently listed for resale on beginning on February 16, 2013, for $5.95 million and then after delistings and relistings on March 23, 2015, (MLS 20152389) for $4.95 million. The home currently belongs to a different family.

Cerullo's Inspiration Network compensation in 2012 was nearly $1.7 million, with his wife and two children additionally receiving more than $100,000 each, according to a 2013 report by the Chronicle of Philanthropy.

== Personal and family ==
Cerullo and his wife, Barbara have been married for 42 years, and have two adult children, evangelist Ben Cerullo and Becky Cerullo-Henderson and five grandchildren. Together, David and Barbara Cerullo host the daily national television series, Inspiration Today.
