= Cycle of the West =

Poetry collection

A Cycle of the West is a collection of five epic poems (called "Songs") written and published over a nearly thirty-year span by John G. Neihardt. As one extended work of literature, the Cycle treats historical topics from the American settlement of the Great Plains and the displacement of the Native American cultures there.

Each poem is written as enjambed heroic couplets in several chapters. As Neihardt gained experience with the form, he began to close chapters, and often verse paragraphs, in the middle of a line, with the first line of the next chapter completing both the suspended line and rhyme. The effect is to pull the speaker forward until the only completely resolved couplet is the one at the end of the Song.

By internal chronological order, the five songs are (with the date of first)

- The Song of Three Friends (1919)
- The Song of Hugh Glass (1915)
- The Song of Jed Smith (1941)
- The Song of the Indian Wars (1925)
- The Song of the Messiah (1935)

== The Song of Three Friends ==
This poem comprises eight cantos.

The story begins in 1822—and follows an expedition of Major Andrew Henry during a series of arduous journeys over the Trans-Missouri region: following the Grand, Missouri and Yellowstone Rivers.

The poem examines the exploits of three trappers—Will Carpenter, Mike Fink, and Frank Talbeau—who through shared experiences have developed a close friendship. But the bonds of friendship uniting the trio explode after Will succeeds in wooing the Indian girl who had stolen Mike's heart. Mike's jealously leads to murder: the remaining cantos complete the narrative, in which only one of the original three will survive to tell the tale.

== The Song of Hugh Glass ==
This poem comprises five cantos.

The story begins in 1823—just after the Leavenworth campaign against the Arikara Indians—and follows an expedition of Major Andrew Henry during a series of arduous journeys over the Trans-Missouri region.

The poem describes the friendship that springs up between two trappers—an older man named Hugh Glass, and a younger named Jamie—who fight, scout and hunt together in the wilds. The story is set when Jamie and a companion betray Hugh: Hugh is abandoned—alive, and badly wounded—to die by the Missouri; to allow Jamie and his companion to safely flee the enmity of hostile Indians in the vicinity. Jamie and his fellow cover their cowardice with a specious lie: that they left only after Hugh died of natural causes, whereupon they first buried him before riding north to rejoin the trapping-party.

However, against all odds, Hugh survives. Regaining consciousness and finding himself alone, Hugh shrewdly deduces the identity of those who betrayed him. Then—fired by a relentless hate to punish those who left him to die—Hugh claws his painful way back to the land of the living: but only to set out to track down his betrayers and deal out some requisite summary justice.

The story is retold in the 1971 film Man in the Wilderness. It is also the basis for Michael Punke's 2002 novel The Revenant, which was adapted into the 2015 film of the same name starring Leonardo DiCaprio.
