= Hugh Glass =

American fur trapper and frontiersman (1783–1833)

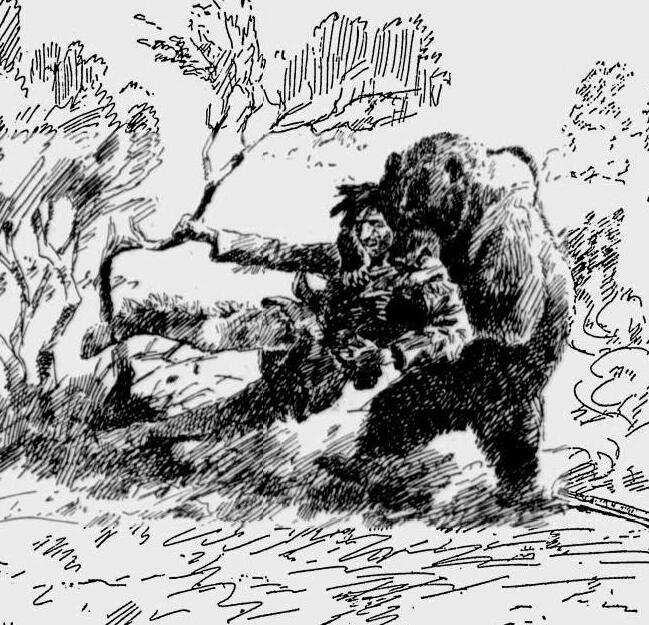
- Depiction of the bear attacking Glass. Drawing by Charles M. Russell, 1922.
- Born: c. 1783; Scranton, Pennsylvania, U.S.
- Died: 1833 (aged approximately 50); Unorganized U.S. territory (near present-day Williston, North Dakota)
- Other names: Old Hugh, Old Rinoe, Old Glass
- Occupations: Frontiersman, trapper, fur trader, hunter, explorer
- Employer(s): Rocky Mountain Fur Company, Jean Lafitte, self-employed
- Known for: Surviving a grizzly bear attack
- Spouse: Unknown

Hugh Glass (c. 1783 – 1833) was an American frontiersman, fur trapper, trader, hunter and explorer. He is best known for his story of survival and forgiveness after being left for dead by companions when he was mauled by a grizzly bear.

No records exist regarding his origins but he is widely said to have been born in Pennsylvania to Scotch-Irish parents. Glass became an explorer of the watershed of the Upper Missouri River, in present-day Montana, the Dakotas, and the Platte River area of Nebraska. His life story has been the basis of two feature-length films: Man in the Wilderness (1971) and The Revenant (2015). They both portray the survival struggle of Glass who, after being abandoned by companions, crawled and stumbled 200 miles (320 km) to Fort Kiowa, South Dakota.

Despite the story's popularity, its accuracy has been disputed. It was first recorded in 1825 in The Port Folio, a Philadelphia literary journal, as a literary piece and later picked up by various newspapers. Although originally published anonymously, it was later revealed to be the work of James Hall, brother of The Port Folio's editor. There is no writing from Hugh Glass himself to corroborate the tale's veracity, and even if true there were likely embellishments added over the years.

== Early life ==
Hugh Glass is believed to have been born in Pennsylvania, to Irish parents who had emigrated from present day Northern Ireland. His life before the famous bear attack is largely unverifiable, and his frontier story contained numerous embellishments. He was reported to have been captured by pirates under the command of Gulf of Mexico chief Jean Lafitte off the coast of Texas in 1816, and was forced to become a pirate for up to two years. Glass allegedly escaped by swimming to shore near what is present-day Galveston, Texas. He was later rumored to have been captured by the Pawnee tribe, with whom he lived for several years. Glass traveled to St. Louis, Missouri in 1821, accompanying several Pawnee delegates invited to meet with U.S. authorities.

== General Ashley's 1823 expedition ==
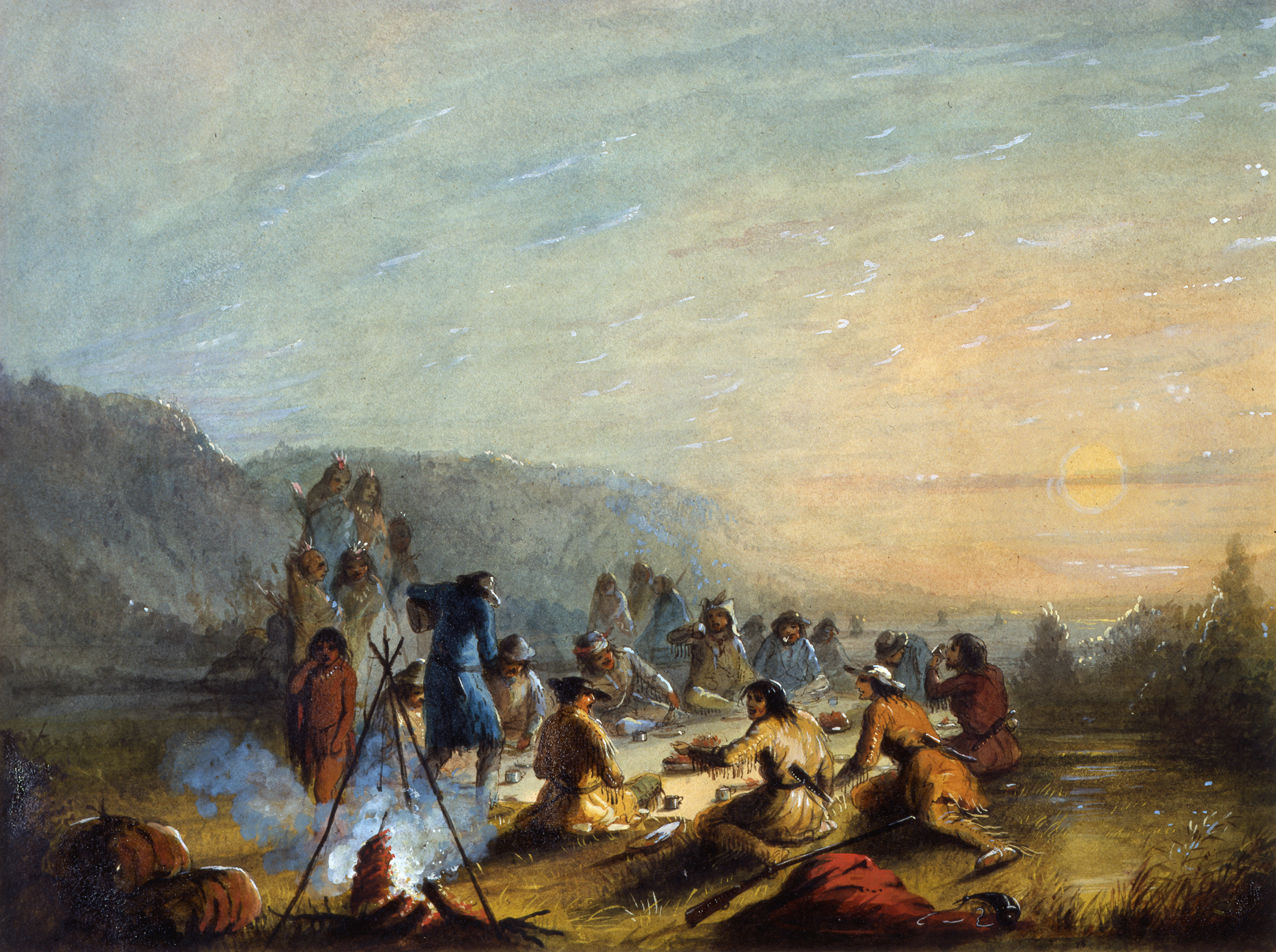
Some mountain men maintained a close relationship with the Native American tribes

In 1822, many men responded to an advertisement in the Missouri Gazette and Public Advertiser placed by General William Henry Ashley, which called for a corps of 100 men to "ascend the river Missouri" as part of a fur-trading venture. Many of them, who later earned reputations as famous mountain men, joined the enterprise, including James Beckwourth, David Jackson, William Sublette, Jim Bridger, John S. Fitzgerald, James Clyman and Jedediah Smith. These men and others would later be known as "Ashley's Hundred". Glass, however, did not join Ashley's company until the next year, when he ascended the Missouri River with Ashley. In June 1823, they met up with many of the men that had joined in 1822, and were attacked by Arikara warriors. Glass was apparently shot in the leg and the survivors retreated downstream and sent for help.

Glass wrote a letter to the parents of John S. Gardner, killed on June 2, 1823:

Dr Sir:

My painful duty it is to tell you of the death of your son who befell at the hands of the Indians 2nd June in the early morning. He died a little while after he was shot and asked me to inform you of his sad fate. We brought him to the ship when he soon died.

Mr. Smith a young man of our company made a powerful prayer who moved us all greatly and I am persuaded John died in peace. His body we buried with others near this camp and marked the grave with a log. His things we will send to you.

The savages are greatly treacherous. We traded with them as friends but after a great storm of rain and thunder they came at us before light and many were hurt. I myself was shot in the leg. Master Ashley is bound to stay in these parts till the traitors are rightly punished.

Yr Obt Svt Hugh Glass

=== Grizzly bear mauling ===
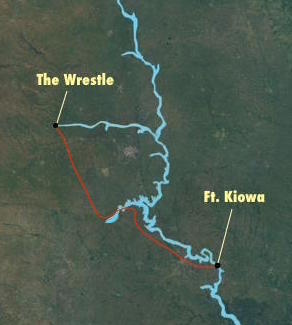
The 200 miles (320 km) route of the 1823 odyssey by Glass

Glass and the rest of the Ashley Party eventually returned to Fort Kiowa to regroup for the trip west. Andrew Henry, Ashley's partner, had joined the group, and he along with Glass and several others set out overland to the Yellowstone River. Near the forks of the Grand River, near present-day Shadehill Reservoir, Perkins County, South Dakota, while scouting for game for the expedition larder, Glass surprised and disturbed a mother grizzly bear with two cubs. The bear charged, picked him up, bit, slashed and lacerated his flesh, severely wounded him, and forced him to the ground. Hearing Glass's screams for help, several of the party made their way to Glass and killed the bear. In words attributed to another trapper, Hiram Allen, who was at the scene: "the monster had torn the flesh from the lower part of the body, and from the lower limbs. He also had his neck shockingly torn, even to the degree that an aperture appeared to have been made into the windpipe, and his breath to exude at the side of his neck. Blood flowed freely, but fortunately his hands and arms were not disabled." The men were convinced Glass would not survive his injuries; nevertheless, they carried Glass on a litter for two days, but doing so greatly slowed the pace of the group's travel.

Henry asked for two volunteers to stay with Glass until he died and then bury him. John S. Fitzgerald and a man later identified as "Bridges" stepped forward, and as the rest of the party moved on, began digging his grave. Later, claiming that they were interrupted by attacking Arikara, the pair grabbed the rifle, knife, and other equipment belonging to Glass and took flight. Fitzgerald and "Bridges" later caught up with the party and incorrectly reported to Ashley that Glass had died. There is a debate whether Bridges was actually famed mountain man Jim Bridger.

Despite his injuries, Glass regained consciousness, but found himself abandoned without weapons or equipment. He had festering wounds, a broken leg, and deep cuts on his back that exposed his bare ribs. Glass lay mutilated and alone, more than 200 miles (320 km) from the nearest American settlement at Fort Kiowa, on the Missouri River. Glass set the bone of his broken leg, wrapped himself in the bear hide his companions had placed over him as a shroud, and began crawling back to Fort Kiowa. To prevent gangrene, Glass allowed maggots to eat the dead infected flesh in his wounds.

Using Thunder Butte as a navigational landmark, Glass crawled overland south toward the Cheyenne River where he fashioned a crude raft and floated downstream to Fort Kiowa. The journey took him six weeks. He survived mostly on wild berries and roots.

== Pursuit of Fitzgerald and "Bridges" ==
After recovering from his wounds, Glass set out again to find John Fitzgerald and "Bridges". He eventually travelled to Fort Henry on the Yellowstone River but found it deserted. A note indicated that Andrew Henry and company had relocated to a new camp at the mouth of the Bighorn River. Arriving there, Glass found "Bridges", but apparently forgave him because of his youth, and then re-enlisted with Ashley's company.

Glass later learned that Fitzgerald had joined the army and was stationed at Fort Atkinson in present-day Nebraska. Glass reportedly spared Fitzgerald's life because he would be executed by the army captain for killing a soldier of the United States Army. However, the captain asked Fitzgerald to return the stolen rifle to Glass, and before departing Glass warned Fitzgerald never to leave the army, or he would still kill him. According to an account by Glass's friend George C. Yount, not published until 1923, Glass also obtained $300 as compensation.

== Further explorations for General Ashley in 1824 ==
In the period intervening, between finding "Bridges" and finding Fitzgerald, Glass and four others were dispatched in February 1824 with mail for Fort Atkinson. They traveled up the Powder River, then across to the Platte River. There they constructed bull skin boats and traveled down the Platte River to the lower end of the Black Hills. Glass and his party discovered a settlement of 38 lodges of Arikara. Their leader, who was known by Glass, declared the tribe to be friendly and invited them in so the men went ashore. While smoking with him in his lodge, Glass noticed their equipment being taken by the residents and realized it was a trap. The men quickly fled but two were killed by the pursuing war party. Glass managed to hide behind some rocks until the Arikara gave up their search but was separated from the two other survivors. He was relieved to find his knife and flint in his shot pouch and traveled to Fort Kiowa, surviving off the land.

Glass returned to the frontier as a trapper and fur trader. He was later employed as a hunter for the U.S. Army garrison at Fort Union, near Williston, North Dakota.

== Death ==
Glass was killed along with two of his fellow trappers (Edward Rose and Hilain Menard) in early 1833 on the Yellowstone River in an attack by the Arikara. One of the Ashley men told an account on his death:

“We returned together and buried the three men, amid the most terrible scenes that I had ever witnessed. The crying was truly appalling. The three men were well known, and highly esteemed by the Crows. When their bodies were lowered to their last resting-place, numberless fingers were voluntarily chopped off and thrown into the graves; hair and trinkets of every description were also contributed, and the graves were finally filled up..” .

A monument to Glass was placed near the site of his mauling on the southern shore of the present-day Shadehill Reservoir in Perkins County, South Dakota, at the forks of the Grand River. The nearby Hugh Glass Lakeside Use Area is a free state-managed campground and picnic area.

== In popular culture ==
Glass's life has been recounted in numerous books and dramas.

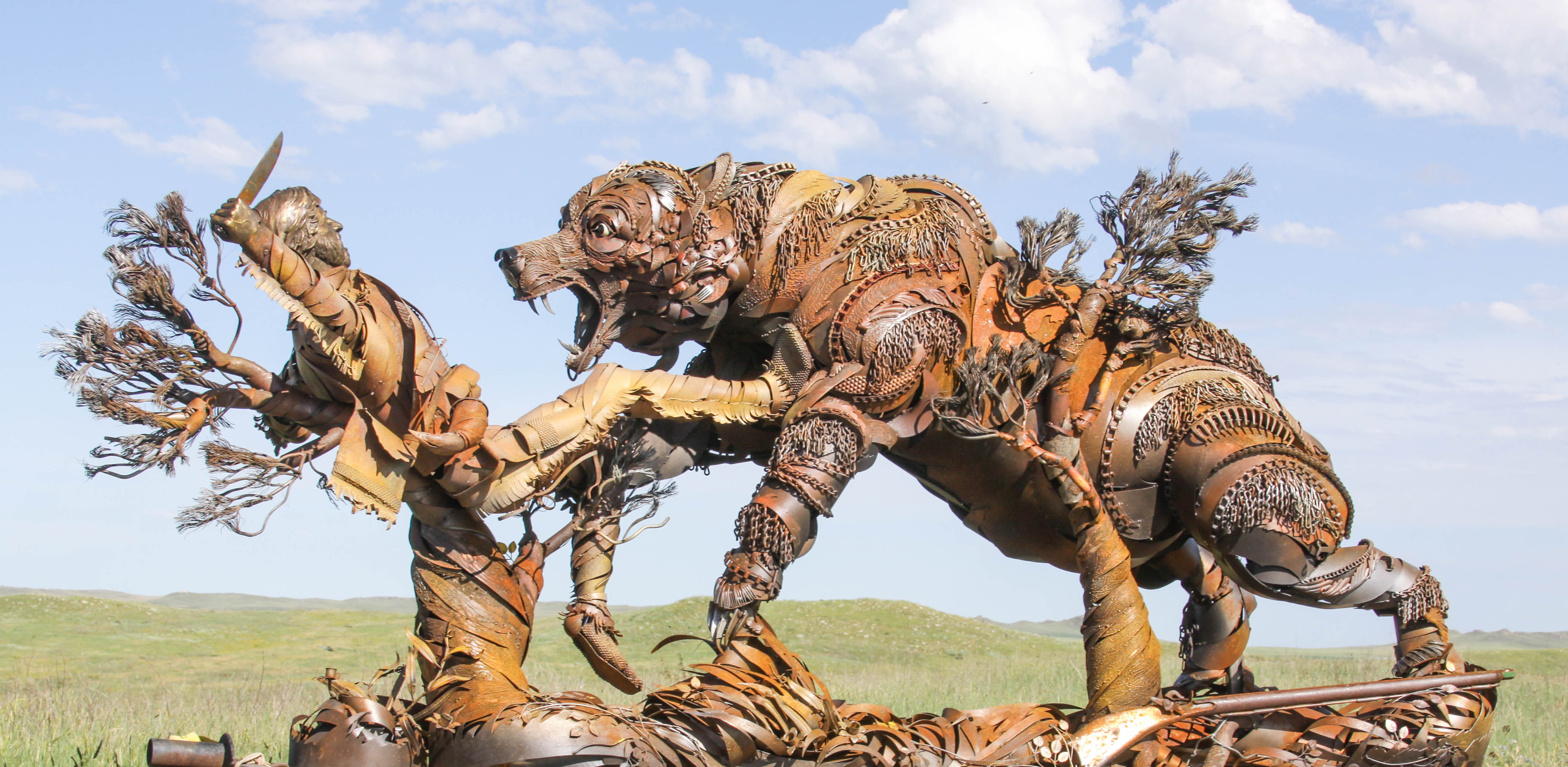
Sculpture at the Grand River Museum in Lemmon, South Dakota

- "The Song of Hugh Glass" (1915) is the second part of the sequence of epic poems, Cycle of the West, by John G. Neihardt.
- Lord Grizzly (1954) is an account of Glass's ordeal, by Frederick Manfred.
- In the 1966 episode "Hugh Glass Meets the Bear" of the syndicated television series, Death Valley Days, the British actor John Alderson played the part of Glass. Morgan Woodward was cast as trapper Thomas Fitzpatrick, Victor French as Louis Baptiste, and Tris Coffin as Major Andrew Henry.
- The film Man in the Wilderness (1971) is loosely based on Glass. It stars Richard Harris as Zachary Bass and John Huston as Captain Henry.
- Dewitt Lee played Sam Glass in a film called Apache Blood (1975), a story loosely based on that of Glass.
- Author John Myers Myers wrote The Saga of Hugh Glass: Pirate, Pawnee, and Mountain Man, a historical account published by the University of Nebraska Press in 1976.
- Roger Zelazny and Gerald Hausman meshed the stories of John Colter and Glass in the 1994 novel Wilderness.
- Hugh Glass, Jim Bridger and Thomas Fitzpatrick appear in The Wandering Hill: Volume 2 of the Berrybender Narratives by Larry McMurtry (New York, Simon & Schuster, 2003). The novel begins with the return of Glass from his bear mauling and his attempt to settle the score with Fitzpatrick and Bridger.
- The song "Six Weeks" by Of Monsters and Men is "inspired by the true tale of American frontiersman Hugh Glass, seemingly left for dead after killing a bear that attacked him."
- Michael Punke's 2002 novel, The Revenant, is a fictional retelling of Glass's encounter with the bear and search for revenge.
- A 2014 episode of podcast The Dollop features Glass as its main subject of discussion.
- The May 27, 2015, episode of the History Channel's Monument Guys, "Tesla and the Unbreakable Glass," features the construction of sculpture of Glass and a bear.
- Sculptor John Lopez unveils a life-size welded sculpture of Hugh Glass being attacked by a Grizzly at the inaugural "Hugh Glass Rendezvous" held on the site that the actual mauling took place in 1823. The sculpture is permanently on display at the Grand River Museum in Lemmon, SD.
- Leonardo DiCaprio played a largely fictionalized version of Glass in the 2015 film The Revenant, directed by Alejandro González Iñárritu. The film is based in part on Punke's novel and was met with critical acclaim. It earned 12 Academy Award nominations and won three. For his portrayal of Glass, DiCaprio won the Academy Award for Best Actor.
- Hugh Glass appears in World of Warcraft as a deranged merchant in Grizzly Hills alongside his "pet" bear Griselda.
- The book "Cowboys, Mountain Men, & Grizzly Bears: Fifty of the Grittiest Moments in the History of the Wild West" by Matthew P. Mayo has a chapter about Hugh Glass.
- In the 2024 INSP series, The Tall Tales of Jim Bridger, Bridger and Captain Elias Colson run into Thomas Fitzgerald, and Bridger recounts the tale of the two of them leaving Hugh Glass to die.
- "Mountain Man Boogie" by Scissorfight immortalized Hugh Glass.
