= Thunder Butte =

Geographic feature in South Dakota, United States

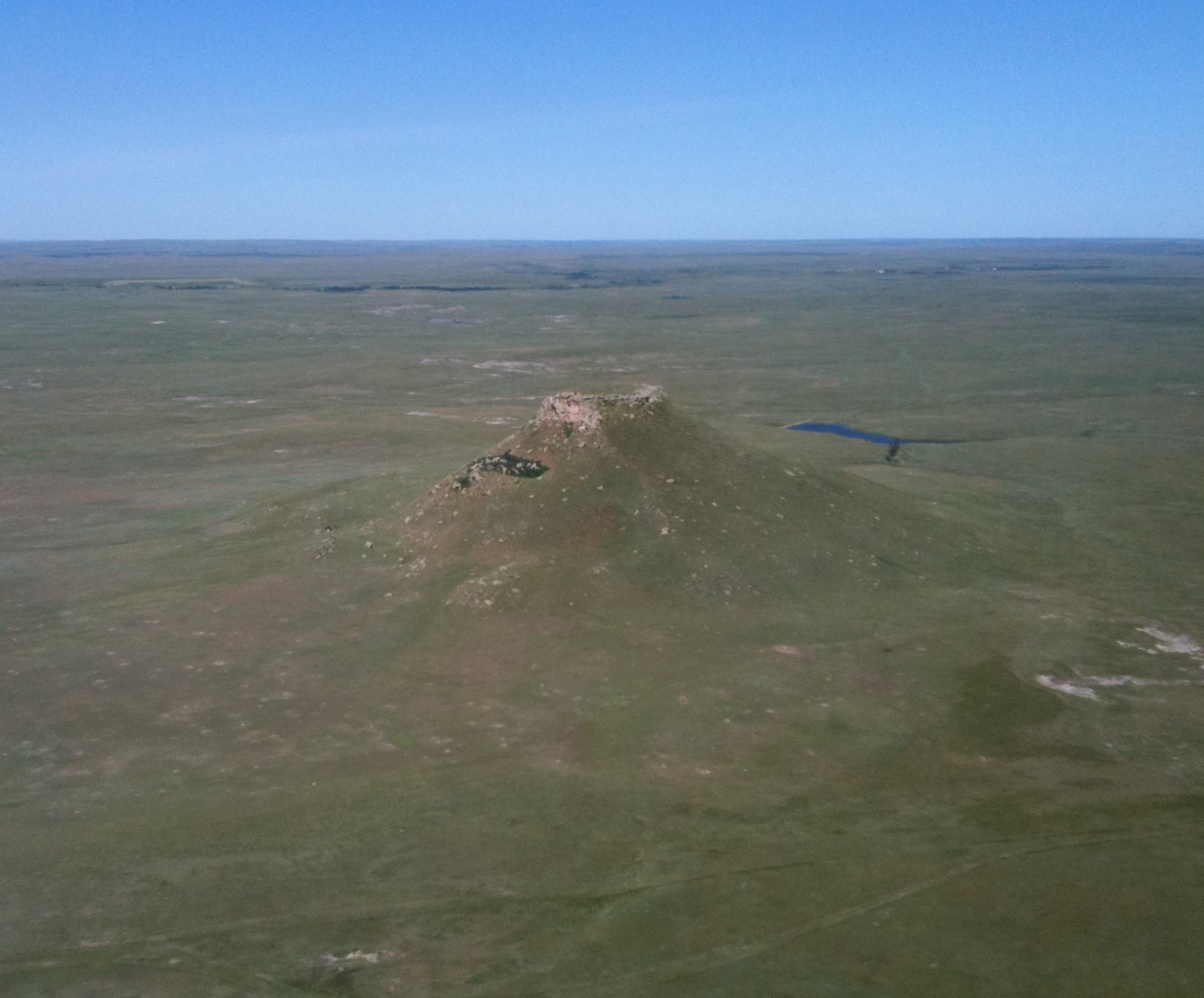

Highest point
- Coordinates: 45°19′11″N 101°52′51″W

Geography
- Location within South Dakota
- Location: Ziebach County, South Dakota

Geology
- Orogeny: Differential erosion
- Rock age: Paleocene (66 - 57 mya)

Thunder Butte (Lakota: Wakíŋyaŋ Pahá) is a prominent butte landmark located in the northwest corner of Ziebach County, South Dakota, in the United States. Thunder Butte is a large, isolated hill that can be seen for many miles in every direction, and has served throughout history as an important orientation point for area residents or a navigational aide for travelers crossing the surrounding plains. The butte gives its name to a small community at its base, and to a small creek that runs into the Moreau River.

== Geography ==
Thunder Butte was formed by differential erosion. Its summit is 2,733 feet (833 meters) above sea level, and rises some three to five hundred feet (90 – 150 metres) above the surrounding grasslands. Thunder Butte is the highest point in Ziebach County. Thunder Butte lies on the drainage divide between the Grand River, to the north, and the Moreau River to the south; both rivers drain eastward to the Missouri.

The butte is located about 75 miles (121 km) west of the Missouri River, and about 105 miles (169 km) northeast of the Black Hills, (both distances as the crow flies). The geographical coordinates of Thunder Butte (Wakinyan Paha) are Latitude N 45.319978 (49 19 12 N) and Longitude W -101.880704 (-101 52 51 W). The butte lies in the Southeast quarter of Section 26 of Township 16 North, Range 18 East.

== Native Americans and Thunder Butte ==
Thunder Butte is “Wakinyan Paha” in the language of the Lakota people, to whom the butte has historic, religious and cultural significance. In traditional Lakota lore, thunder originated on the butte. Four Bands of the Lakota Sioux has resided in this area since about 1776 after being forced onto the Reservation. A high concentration of Lakota Sioux people still reside around the Thunder Butte landmark – Ziebach County, where Thunder Butte is located, has a 72.29% Native American population. The prominent landmark is clearly visible from two surrounding reservations of the Lakota and Dakota Sioux people; the butte is within the Cheyenne River Indian Reservation which has Lakota people from four bands/tribes of the Lakota nation, and the butte is only a short distance from the southern boundary of the Standing Rock Indian Reservation which has people of the Lakota and Dakota nations

== Geology ==
Thunder Butte has an erosion resistant cap of harder Paleocene age sedimentary rock known as the Ludlow Formation. Lower elevations of surroundings grasslands/plains are underlain by the softer and more easily eroded Hell Creek sedimentary rock. The cap of Ludlow Formation rock is an erosional remnant, and other buttes in this area of western South Dakota are also capped by similar Ludlow Formation erosional remnants. Geological maps are available online, which show Thunder Butte, and its cap of the Ludlow Formation; see the 15 minute (1:62,500 scale) Glad Valley geologic map, which can be viewed and downloaded from the SD Geological Surveys website. The regional geological aspect can also be viewed on the Geologic map of South Dakota, but Thunder Butte's cap of Ludlow Formation rock is too small a feature to be shown on the regional map with its larger 1:500,000 scale.

== In literature ==
Literary references to Thunder Butte appear in the story of Hugh Glass, a mountain man/trapper with the 1823 party of William Henry Ashley and Andrew Henry, which was traveling overland from Fort Kiowa to Fort Henry at the mouth of the Yellowstone River. In August 1823, on the south fork of the Grand River (located north west of Thunder Butte, in Perkins County, South Dakota), Hugh Glass encountered a grizzly bear and was so badly mauled that he was left for dead by the others in his party. Reviving, he found himself alone and unable to travel except by crawling. Hugh Glass crawled from the Grand River to the Moreau River and then on south to the Cheyenne River, a distance of some 80 to 100 miles (130 to 160 km). This "crawl" consumed six weeks. After reaching the Cheyenne River, Hugh Glass recuperated for a time and then fashioned a crude raft on which he floated down the Cheyenne River and Missouri River to Fort Kiowa. The Grand-to-Moreau-to-Cheyenne River "crawl" took Glass by Thunder Butte on the divide between the Moreau and Grand Rivers, and factual and fictional accounts note that in making his crawl to the Cheyenne River, Hugh Glass navigated by watching Thunder Butte which was first ahead, then alongside, then behind him.

Thunder Butte has been commemorated by white settlers who saw beauty and majesty in the prominent landmark. The following poem was written by G. M. Drummond, who was appointed Zeibach County Superintendent of Schools in 1912 and elected in 1927. A pioneer and longtime resident of the area, Mr. Drummond died in 1973.

"Thunder Butte"

In northern Ziebach County
Stands Thunder Butte alone
The monarch of surrounding hills ...
With a diadem of stone!
He stood there countless ages,
While red men roamed the plains
And Buffalo and antelope
Grazed over vast domains.
There still he stands undaunted,
While seasons come and go,
Unchanged alike by summer sun
Or by the Winter snow.
The Persepolis of Persia
Stood not more dignified,
Nor the Acropolis of Athens
In its historic pride!
Rule on, Majestic Mountain!
May nothing ever mar
Your innate rugged beauty,
That may be seen afar.

G. M. Drummond

From, “South Dakota's Ziebach County, History of the Prairie” published in 1982 by the Ziebach County Historical Society in Dupree, SD.

== Other geographical features and locations named after Thunder Butte ==
Thunder Butte Creek originates to the west of the butte, and flows by the southwest side of the butte, and then extends southeasterly to join the Moreau River. The small unincorporated community of Thunder Butte is located near this river junction at these geographical coordinates: Lat. 45.21166 N, Long. -101.670016 W.

== Notes ==
Many other buttes in this area of western South Dakota are capped by erosional remnants. Besides the Ludlow Formation, buttes in this area are capped by the Tongue River formations, White River Group sediments, and clinker beds formed by the combustion of coal seams which bake the surrounding rock into a hard erosion resistant layer.

== See also ==
- Hugh Glass
- Ziebach County, South Dakota
- Lakota people
- Wakinyan
