= The Revenant (2015 film) =

American film by Alejandro G. Iñárritu

- Theatrical release poster
- Directed by: Alejandro G. Iñárritu
- Screenplay by: Mark L. Smith; Alejandro G. Iñárritu
- Based on: The Revenant by Michael Punke
- Produced by: Arnon Milchan; Steve Golin; Alejandro G. Iñárritu; Mary Parent; Keith Redmon; James W. Skotchdopole
- Starring: Leonardo DiCaprio; Tom Hardy; Domhnall Gleeson; Will Poulter
- Cinematography: Emmanuel Lubezki
- Edited by: Stephen Mirrione
- Music by: Ryuichi Sakamoto; Alva Noto
- Production companies: Regency Enterprises; RatPac Entertainment; New Regency; Anonymous Content; M Productions; Appian Way Productions
- Distributed by: 20th Century Fox
- Release dates: December 16, 2015 (TCL Chinese Theatre); December 25, 2015 (United States)
- Running time: 156 minutes
- Country: United States
- Languages: English; Arikara; Pawnee; Canadian French
- Budget: $135 million
- Box office: $533.6 million

The Revenant is a 2015 American epic Western film directed by Alejandro G. Iñárritu. The screenplay by Mark L. Smith and Iñárritu is based in part on Michael Punke's 2002 novel The Revenant, which describes frontiersman Hugh Glass's experiences in 1823. The film is a remake of the film Man in the Wilderness (1971). The film stars Leonardo DiCaprio as Glass, alongside Tom Hardy, Domhnall Gleeson and Will Poulter.

In August 2001, Akiva Goldsman purchased Punke's manuscript. Iñárritu signed on to direct The Revenant in August 2011. In April 2014, after several delays due to other projects, Iñárritu confirmed that he was beginning work on it and that DiCaprio had been cast in the lead role. Principal photography began in October 2014. Location and crew concerns delayed production from May to August 2015.

The Revenant premiered at TCL Chinese Theatre in Los Angeles, California, on December 16, 2015. It had a limited release on December 25 and a wide release on January 8, 2016 by 20th Century Fox. It was a commercial success, grossing $533 million worldwide and becoming Iñárritu's highest-grossing film. It received critical acclaim, with praise for DiCaprio's performance, Iñárritu's direction and Emmanuel Lubezki's cinematography.

It won three Golden Globe Awards and five BAFTA Awards, including Best Film at both ceremonies. At the 88th Academy Awards, the film received 12 nominations, including Best Picture and Best Supporting Actor (Hardy). It won the Academy Awards for Best Director (Iñárritu, his second consecutive in that category), Best Actor (DiCaprio, his first after 5 previous nominations), and Best Cinematography (Emmanuel Lubezki, his third consecutive in that category). DiCaprio also won the Golden Globe Award, the Screen Actors Guild Award, the BAFTA Award, and the Critics' Choice Award for Best Actor.

== Plot ==
Fur trapper Hugh Glass watches as American soldiers burn down a Native American village on the Great Plains.

Years later, in 1823, during the Arikara War, Glass guides Captain Andrew Henry's trappers through the territory of the present-day Dakotas. While he and his half-Pawnee son, Hawk, are hunting, the company's camp is attacked by an Arikara war party which is seeking to recover its chief's abducted daughter, Powaqa. Many of the trappers are killed during the fight, and the rest of them escape onto a boat. Guided by Glass, the survivors begin a trek to Fort Kiowa on foot because Glass believes traveling down the Missouri River will make them vulnerable. After docking, the crew stash their pelts near the shore.

While scouting game, Glass is mauled and left near death by a grizzly bear. Fearing another Arikara attack, trapper John Fitzgerald argues that they must mercy-kill Glass and keep moving. Henry agrees, but he is unable to pull the trigger. Instead, he offers to pay anyone who will stay with Glass and bury him after he dies. When the only volunteers are Hawk and the young Jim Bridger, Fitzgerald, wanting the money to recoup his losses from the abandoned pelts, also agrees to stay.

After the others leave, Fitzgerald attempts to smother Glass but is stopped and intervened by Hawk. Fitzgerald stabs Hawk to death as Glass watches helplessly. The next morning, Fitzgerald convinces Bridger, who is unaware of Hawk's murder, that the Arikara are approaching and they must abandon Glass. At first Bridger protests, but he ultimately follows Fitzgerald after the latter leaves Glass half-buried alive in a makeshift grave. Bridger leaves behind a canteen on which he had engraved a spiral symbol. The next morning, Fitzgerald admits to Bridger that there are no pursuing Arikara. They reach the fort, and Fitzgerald falsely reports to Henry that Hawk vanished and Glass died. Bridger is complicit in the lie about Glass's death, but remains unaware of Hawk's murder.

Glass starts an arduous journey through the wilderness, bringing Bridger's canteen with him. He performs a crude cauterization of his wounds and eludes the pursuing Arikara by jumping into river rapids. He encounters Pawnee refugee Hikuc, who tells Glass that "revenge is in the Creator's hands." The men share bison meat and travel together. As a storm approaches, Hikuc constructs a sweat lodge for the feverish Glass to shelter in. After a hallucinogenic experience in the lodge, Glass emerges to discover that French Canadian hunters have lynched Hikuc. Glass infiltrates the hunters' camp and sees their leader, Toussaint, raping Powaqa. Glass frees her; she castrates Toussaint and flees while Glass kills several hunters and recovers Hikuc's horse, leaving Bridger's canteen behind. The following morning, Glass is ambushed by the Arikara and driven over a cliff on his horse. He survives the night by disemboweling the dead horse and sheltering inside its carcass.

A French survivor staggers into Fort Kiowa, and Bridger recognizes the man's spiral-engraved canteen. Believing that it was stolen, Henry organizes a search party to find Hawk. Fitzgerald, realizing that Glass is alive, empties the outpost's safe and flees, intending to reach Texas. The search party finds the exhausted Glass. Furious, Henry orders the arrest of Bridger upon returning to the fort, but Glass vouches for him, saying Bridger was deceived by Fitzgerald, who murdered Hawk. Glass and Henry set out in pursuit of Fitzgerald.

After the two men split up, Fitzgerald ambushes, kills, and scalps Henry. Glass props up Henry's corpse on his horse to act as a decoy, taking its place himself to ambush Fitzgerald and shoot him in the shoulder. He pursues Fitzgerald to a riverbank, where they engage in a brutal fight. Glass is about to kill Fitzgerald, but he spots a band of Arikara downstream. He remembers Hikuc's words and pushes Fitzgerald downstream into the hands of the Arikara. Their chief, Elk Dog, kills Fitzgerald by stabbing and then scalping him, and the Arikara (who have found Powaqa) spare Glass. Glass retreats into the mountains, where he is visited by his wife's spirit.

== Cast ==
- Leonardo DiCaprio as Hugh Glass
- Tom Hardy as John S. Fitzgerald
- Domhnall Gleeson as Andrew Henry
- Will Poulter as Jim Bridger
- Forrest Goodluck as Hawk
- Paul Anderson as Anderson
- Kristoffer Joner as Murphy
- Duane Howard as Elk Dog
- Melaw Nakehk'o as Powaqa
- Arthur Redcloud as Hikuc
- Lukas Haas as Jones
- Brendan Fletcher as Fryman
- Joshua Burge as Stubby Bill
- Tom Guiry as Billy Brother Trapper
- Grace Dove as Hugh Glass's wife
- Fabrice Adde as Toussaint

== Production ==
=== Development ===
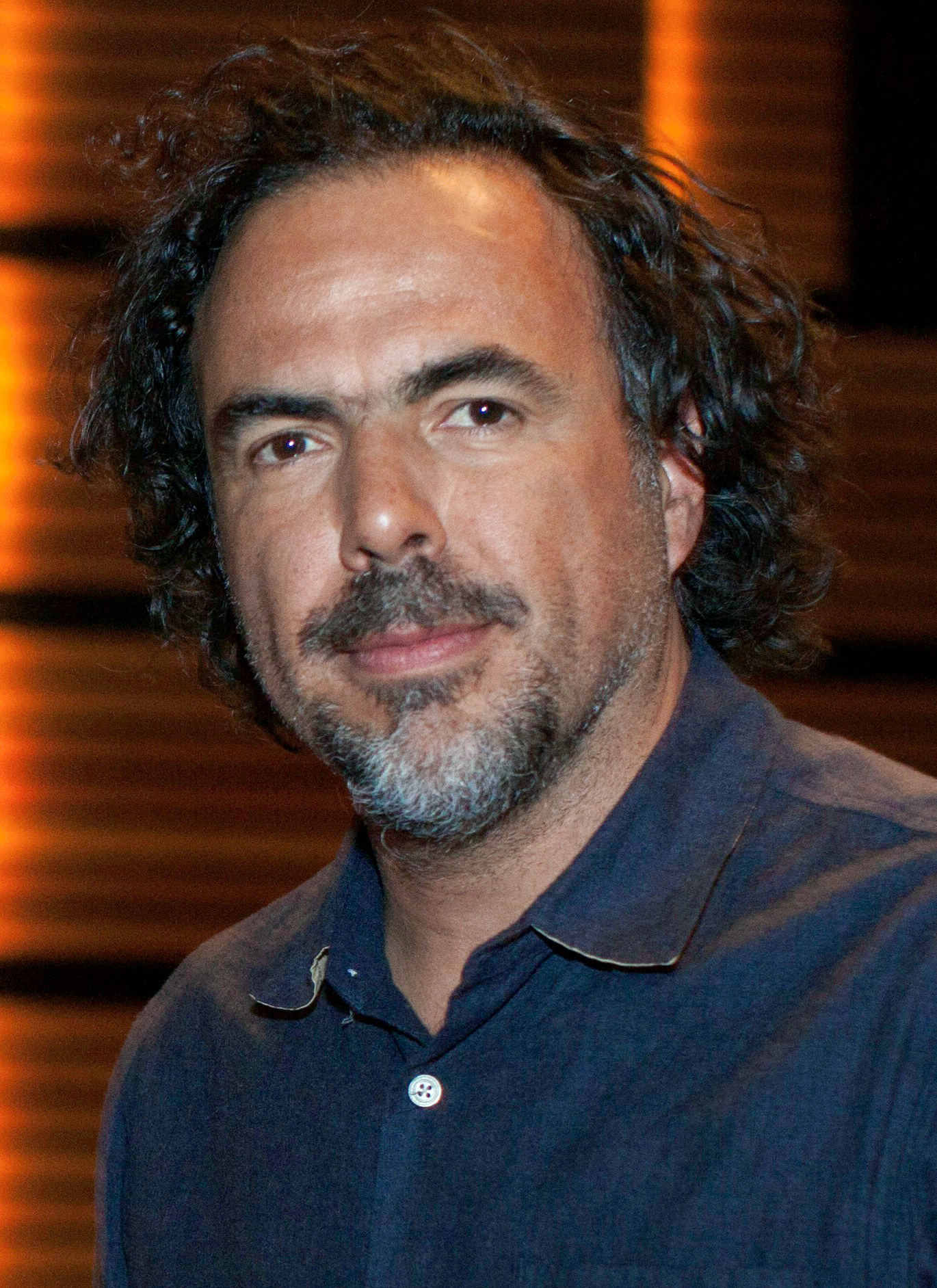
Director Alejandro G.Iñárritu

Development of The Revenant began in August 2001, with producer Akiva Goldsman acquiring the rights to Michael Punke's then-unpublished manuscript. David Rabe had written the film's script. The production was picked up by Park Chan-wook, with Samuel L. Jackson in mind to star. Park later left the project. The development stalled until 2010 when Mark L. Smith wrote a new adaptation of the novel for Steve Golin's Anonymous Content. In May 2010, Smith revealed that John Hillcoat was attached to direct the film and that Christian Bale was in negotiation to star. Hillcoat left the project in October 2010. Jean-François Richet was considered to replace him, but Alejandro G.Iñárritu signed on to direct in August 2011. Goldsman was also confirmed to be producing with Weed Road Pictures. In November, New Regency Productions joined to produce with Anonymous Content, and 20th Century Fox was confirmed to be distributing the film. Days later, Iñárritu stated that he was seeking Leonardo DiCaprio and Sean Penn for the two lead roles.

Once Iñárritu agreed to direct, he began working with Smith on script rewrites. In an interview with Creative Screenwriting, Smith admitted that during this process, he was unsure if Iñárritu would even be able to film some of the sequences they wrote. He recalled, "He would have some ideas and I would say, 'Alejandro, we can't pull this off. It's not going to work', and he would say, 'Mark, trust me, we can do this.' In the end, he was right."

The project was put on hold in March 2012, as New Regency hired Iñárritu to direct an adaptation of Flim-Flam Man, Jennifer Vogel's non-fiction book about her criminal father. Penn was also under consideration for the lead role in that film. In December 2012, Iñárritu announced that his next film would be Birdman or (The Unexpected Virtue of Ignorance), a comedy-drama about an actor who once played a famous superhero. He ended up winning the Academy Awards for Best Director and Best Original Screenplay, with the film winning Best Picture. Filming took place in March 2013. The Revenant was scheduled to begin production right after Birdman wrapped.

A production budget of $60 million was granted, with $30 million funded by New Regency. Brett Ratner's RatPac-Dune Entertainment, a joint venture between Ratner's RatPac Entertainment and Fox's former financing partner, Dune Entertainment, also funded the film. Worldview Entertainment, which also co-financed Birdman, was originally set to fund the film but backed out in July 2014 due to the departure of CEO Christopher Woodrow. New Regency approached Fox for additional funding, but Fox declined, citing the pay-or-play contracts made for both DiCaprio and Tom Hardy, which would require that the actors be paid regardless of whether the film is completed. Annapurna Pictures' Megan Ellison entered negotiations to finance the film shortly after. The Chinese company Guangdong Alpha Animation and Culture Company partially financed the film.

=== Filming ===
Principal photography for The Revenant began in October 2014. A planned two-week break from filming in December was extended to six weeks which forced Tom Hardy to drop out of Suicide Squad. In February 2015, Iñárritu, who shot the film using natural lighting, stated that production would last "until the end of April or May", as the crew is "shooting in such remote far-away locations that, by the time we arrive and have to return, we have already spent 40% of the day". Ultimately, principal photography wrapped in August 2015.

The waterfall scenes were filmed at the Kootenai Falls near Libby, Montana. Though the initial plan was to film the last scenes in Canada, the weather was ultimately too warm, leading the filmmakers to locations near the Río Olivia in Tierra del Fuego, Argentina with snow on the ground, to shoot the ending.

Crew members often complained about difficult filming, with many quitting or being fired. Mary Parent was then brought in as a producer. Iñárritu stated that some of the crew members had left the production, explaining that "as a director, if I identify a violin that is out of tune, I have to take that from the orchestra." On his experience, DiCaprio stated: "I can name 30 or 40 sequences that were some of the most difficult things I've ever had to do. Whether it's going in and out of frozen rivers, or sleeping in animal carcasses, or what I ate on set. [I was] enduring freezing cold and possible hypothermia constantly." Hardy lightly wrestled Iñárritu on set to release tension while during filming. During the scene where Hugh and Hawk prayed, both DiCaprio and Lockwood had their eyes closed due to the cold weather condition.

Iñárritu had stated that he originally wanted to film chronologically, a process that would have added $7 million to the production budget. Later he confirmed that it was shot in sequence, though Hardy had stated that it was impossible due to weather conditions. The terrain of the filming locations was not true to the actual Hugh Glass mauling story, which really occurred in modern-day South Dakota.

In July 2015, it was reported that the budget had ballooned from the original $60 million to $95 million, and by the time production wrapped it had reached $135 million.

=== Visual effects ===
The visual effects were produced primarily by Industrial Light & Magic (ILM). Other companies, such as Moving Picture Company (MPC) and Cinesite, also created visual effects.

=== Music ===
The musical score was composed by Japanese musician Ryuichi Sakamoto and German electronic musician Alva Noto with additional music composed by Bryce Dessner. The main body of the score was recorded at the Seattlemusic Scoring Stage in the Bastyr Chapel in greater Seattle, Washington by musicians of the Northwest Sinfonia. Sakamoto conducted these sessions. Bryce Dessner's portion of the score was performed by the 25-piece Berlin-based orchestra known as "s t a r g a z e" under conductor André de Ridder. Additional licensed music includes "Become Ocean", the Pulitzer Prize and Grammy Award-winning work of John Luther Adams as recorded by the Seattle Symphony with conductor Ludovic Morlot and an excerpt of "Jetsun Mila" from French musician and composer Éliane Radigue. A soundtrack album was released online on December 25, 2015, and on CD on January 8, 2016. Milan Records released a vinyl pressing of the soundtrack in April 2016.

The score by Sakamoto and Noto was ruled ineligible for the Academy Award for Best Original Score at the 2016 Oscars as it was deemed that it was "assembled from the music of more than one composer".

=== Documentary ===
The movie was accompanied by a 44-minute documentary, named A World Unseen, highlighting the process of making the production. A World Unseen was released on January 21, 2016, on YouTube. Eliot Rausch served as its director.

== Themes ==
In the Los Angeles Review of Books, critic Wai Chee Dimock compared The Revenant's themes with those addressed in the literary works of James Fenimore Cooper, particularly The Last of the Mohicans. Dimock argues that the film reinterprets the concept of "half-breeds" from a derogatory idea that Cooper despised to an aesthetic way in which to see the world. She compared both works' protagonists—Glass and Hawk-eye—as literary foils, with Glass living an inversion of the latter's biography and perspective.

In the documentary A World Unseen, the director stated that for The Revenant's main themes, he revisits the issues and concerns of intense parental and filial relations, which are readily recognizable as a recurrent theme from his previous works. Regarding the theme of revenge, he mentioned that the approach of vengeance in the film needs to be significantly tempered by anyone who would want to see vengeance as either an effective or useful moral to be applied in life. In the end, he said, there can only be a disappointment and lack of fulfillment for anyone who looks to revenge as providing a higher purpose for living or a life-defining purpose.

The film has been discussed in relation to Indigenous representation and as a rare example of a Hollywood depiction of the Native American genocide in the United States. M. Elise Marubbio states that the film "revises and critiques the grand narratives of American exceptionalism born of the frontier, [...] undercuts the [Western] genre’s tendency towards white privilege through multi-lingual narratives, and centers a counter-narrative focused on Indigenous families and women," while also critiquing Iñárritu for relying on stereotypes in his portrayal of Native women. Reactions to the film from Native commentators were mixed and complex, with Leo Killsback saying that the film "sets a new bar in filmmaking as it achieves what most films fail to do—it fairly represents Indians," while Gyasi Ross criticizes the film's centering on Glass's character, saying that the film's story falls into "the same 'white savior' garbage pile that has permeated pretty much any mainstream movie that includes Natives as major characters." Bob Goulais criticized the film for opening with a portrayal of violence committed by Native Americans, saying, "There were plenty of arrows, brutal beatings and even some scalping. All in the first ten minutes of the film." Craig Falcon, a cultural consultant on the film, praised Iñárritu for trying to ensure that the film was "not exploitative" and for his efforts to portray Native cultures authentically. Sasha LaPointe describes the experience of being retraumatized by watching the scene in which Powaqa is raped, and comments on this particular scene:

As indigenous women, we realize facing that scene was facing a mirror held up to ourselves. It was seeing the reality of our own trauma, the ways we have endured it, [...] the portrayal of violence against indigenous women captured in just a few short seconds on the screen. [...] It is facing generations of surviving, of historical trauma, of memory distilled into a short scene and watching it release from within our bodies and float out into the world. [...] There is no falseness to this scene. No dramatization. This one cuts to the bone and exposes us, because we are still being attacked, still being murdered, still going missing. We are still disappearing.

== Historical accuracy ==
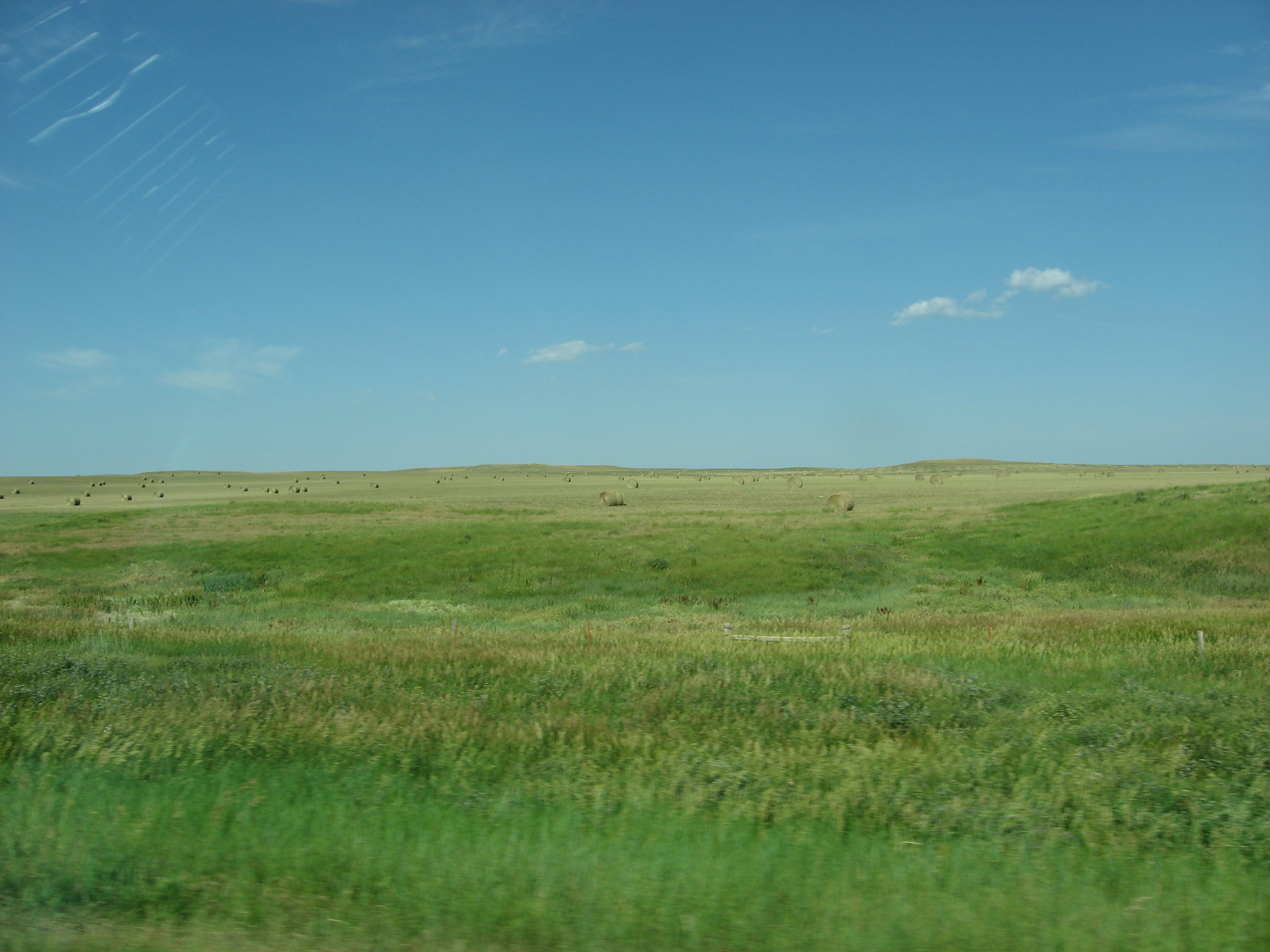
Cheyenne River Indian Reservation is in South Dakota. Glass's survival journey did not take place in the cold season, nor did it involve tall mountain ranges.

The Guardian reported, "The backstory about Glass's love for a Pawnee woman is fiction. It has been suggested the real Glass had such a relationship, but there's no firm evidence—and no evidence that he had any children. ... As for the ending, it has been changed in one significant way: in real life, nobody got killed."

Canadian actor Roy Dupuis was strongly critical of the portrayal of French-Canadian voyageurs as murderous rapists. Dupuis was originally offered a role as a voyageur, but he rejected it due to perceptions of anti-French bias and historical inaccuracies. According to Allan Greer, the Canada Research Chair of colonial North America, "generally the American traders had a worse reputation than the Canadians."

The filmmakers made a special point of emphasizing the importance of historical issues of ethnicity approached in the movie and represented in the mixed ethnic background of Hugh Glass's son portrayed in the film (portrayed as half Pawnee by Glass's wife) as relating to his own life and his identification with ethnic concerns. The director has referred to having encountered constant xenophobia and stated that: "These constant and relentless xenophobic (comments) have been widely spread by the media without shame, embraced and cheered by leaders and communities around the US. The foundation of all this is so outrageous that it can easily be minimized as an SNL sketch, a mere entertainment, a joke ... I debated with myself, if I should bring up this uncomfortable subject tonight but in light of the constant and relentless xenophobic comments that have been expressed recently against my Mexican fellows, it is inevitable."

Bruce Bradley of True West Magazine pointed out several anachronisms hinted in the film such as John Fitzgerald talking about his father having friends in the Texas Rangers and about going to Texas and joining the army himself. However, in 1823, Texas was still part of Mexico and therefore would not have had an American army, let alone the Texas Rangers. Another anachronism involved Hugh Glass discovering a mountain of buffalo skulls while working his way to Fort Kiowa despite the buffalo slaughter not occurring until the 1870s.

=== Native American culture ===
To portray Arikara culture accurately, the filmmakers hired several cultural consultants and teamed up with two linguists to provide faithful Arikara and Pawnee language lines for actors. Hikuc, the Pawnee man who helps Glass survive, is played by a Navajo actor. However, in one scene, a Pawnee character rescuing Glass is accompanied by a voiceover in Inupiaq, which is spoken in Arctic Alaska, thousands of kilometers away and a different language family from Pawnee. The voiceover was a recording of Doreen Nutaaq Simmonds reading a poem from a John Luther Adams recording; the words originally came from an Inuk woman named Uvavnuk, an angakkuq (shaman) and oral poet.

== Release ==
The Revenant had a limited release in the United States on December 25, 2015, including Los Angeles—making it eligible for the 88th Academy Awards—before being released nationwide on January 8, 2016. The film opened in Australia on January 7, 2016, and in the United Kingdom on January 15, 2016. In the Philippines, the film's release date was originally set for January 27, 2016, but it was eventually delayed one week to February 3, 2016. Although studios initially chose not to pursue a theatrical release in China, following its three wins at the 88th Academy Awards on February 28, 2016, the film was granted a release in China but with several cuts. It was released on March 18, 2016. For the film's 10th anniversary, it was released exclusively on IMAX screens for 2 days only (February 26, 2026 and March 1, 2026).

=== Home media ===
The DVD, Blu-ray and 4K Ultra HD Blu-ray were released on April 12, 2016, in the US. Opening sales of the DVD along with online streaming orders placed The Revenant as number one in sales at Amazon. Distribution to major rental outlets in the US was done on May 17, 2016.

=== Piracy ===
On December 20, 2015, less than one week before its release, screener copies of The Revenant were leaked online. The FBI linked this to Alcon Entertainment CEO Andrew Kosove, who denied responsibility. In October 2016, a former 20th Century Fox employee was fined $1.12 million in a separate case for uploading both The Revenant and The Peanuts Movie online.

== Reception ==
=== Box office ===
The Revenant grossed $184.2 million in the United States and Canada and $349.3 million in other countries for a worldwide total of $533.6 million, against a production budget of $135 million. In March 2016, before the film had completed its theatrical domestic and international runs, Deadline Hollywood calculated the net profit of the film to be $61.6 million when factoring together all expenses and revenues.

In North America, The Revenant opened in limited release on December 25, 2015, and over the weekend grossed $474,560 from four theaters in New York City and Los Angeles ($118,640 per screen), finishing twenty-third at the box office. It was the second-biggest theater average of 2015 behind the $130,000 four-screen debut of Steve Jobs. The film earned a total of $1.6 million from its two-week limited run before expanding wide on January 8, 2016, across 3,371 theaters.

It earned $2.3 million from its early Thursday preview showings from 2,510 theaters. On its opening day, the film earned $14.4 million, ranking first at the box office. The film grossed $39.8 million in its opening weekend from 3,375 theaters, exceeding initial projections by 70%, and finishing second at the box office behind Star Wars: The Force Awakens ($42.4 million), which was on its fourth weekend of play. It was the director's biggest opening of all time, and the fourth-biggest for DiCaprio and supporting actor Tom Hardy. Critics noted that The Force Awakens had an advantage from playing at 781 more theaters, family-friendly Sunday matinees, and all North American IMAX theaters. Nevertheless, The Revenant played very balanced across the US and overperformed in all states except the Northeast region. Its wide release weekend is among the top openings in January. It topped the box office in its fifth weekend overall and third weekend in wide release after competing with Ride Along 2 in its second weekend. It added $16 million in its third weekend, which was down 49.7% but topped the box office, despite a blizzard blanketing most of the East Coast which reportedly hurt many films' box office performance. The following weekend it was overtaken by Fox's own animated movie Kung Fu Panda 3 thereby topping the box office for one weekend. Following the announcement of the Oscar nominees on January 14, The Revenant witnessed the biggest boost among the Best Picture category, jumping from $54.1 million to $170.5 million, an increase of +215% up to the Oscar ceremony in the weekend ending February 28.

Outside North America, the film secured a release in 78 countries. It made $20.5 million from 2,407 screens in just 18 markets, placing behind The Force Awakens at the international box office chart and first among newly released films. The following weekend, it added $32.3 million from 25 markets on 4,849 screens. The film topped the international box office in its third weekend—the same weekend when it topped the US box office—overtaking The Force Awakens with $33.7 million from 48 markets. In the United Kingdom and Ireland, it took the number 1 spot with $7.87 million or £5.2 million ($7.4 million) from 589 theaters and remained there for a second weekend declining by 24% with £3.86 million ($5.5 million), and for a third weekend. Similarly, in Russia, it passed The Force Awakens to take the top spot with $7.5 million from 1,063 screens. In France, it has the biggest opening day in Paris and the third-biggest opening weekend of 2016 with $8.2 million. It also opened at No. 1 in Mexico ($5.1 million), Spain ($4 million), the Netherlands ($1.3 million), Belgium ($1.1 million), Argentina ($955,000), Sweden ($914,000), South Korea, Denmark, Norway, Israel, Egypt and Portugal among other markets. In Germany ($4.6 million) and Australia ($2.9 million), it debuted at No. 2 both behind The Force Awakens and in Brazil ($2.17 million) behind The Ten Commandments. It had one of the top ten openings of all time for a Fox film, not accounting for inflation in South Korea with $5.7 million and went on to top the box office there for a second weekend with $3.22 million despite cold weather affecting theater attendance resulting in low box office performance. In Russia, though not opening at number 1, it topped the box office in its second weekend with $4.4 million—more than The Force Awakens—and went on to the top for a third weekend with $3.6 million. In China, it had an opening day of around $11 million from more than 11,000 screens, including $250,000 in midnight previews, and $23 million in two days. In its opening weekend, it grossed $31 million, coming in second place behind the animated Zootopia. IMAX comprised $2.3 million on 278 screens. In terms of total earnings, its largest markets outside of the US and Canada are China ($58.6 million), the United Kingdom ($32.8 million), Germany ($28.7 million) and France ($28.2 million). The film opened in Japan on March 23.

=== Critical response ===
On Rotten Tomatoes, the film has an approval rating of 78%, based on 400 reviews, with an average rating of 7.90/10. The website's critical consensus reads: "As starkly beautiful as it is harshly uncompromising, The Revenant uses Leonardo DiCaprio's committed performance as fuel for an absorbing drama that offers punishing challenges—and rich rewards." On Metacritic, the film has a weighted average score of 76 out of 100, based on 50 critics, indicating "generally favorable reviews". Audiences polled by CinemaScore gave the film an average grade of "B+" on an A+ to F scale, and PostTrak reported audiences gave it an overall positive score of 85% and a 59% "definite recommend".

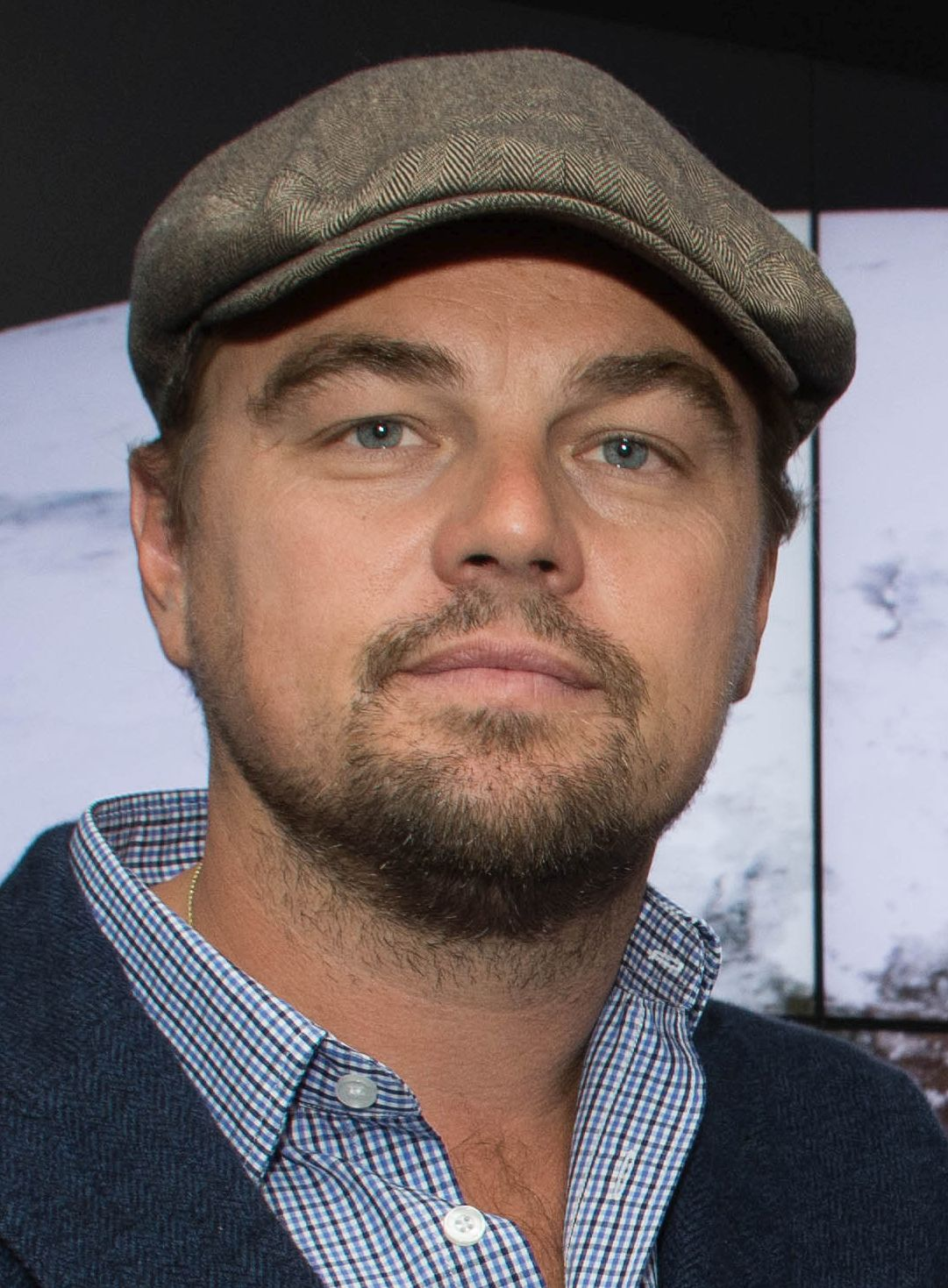
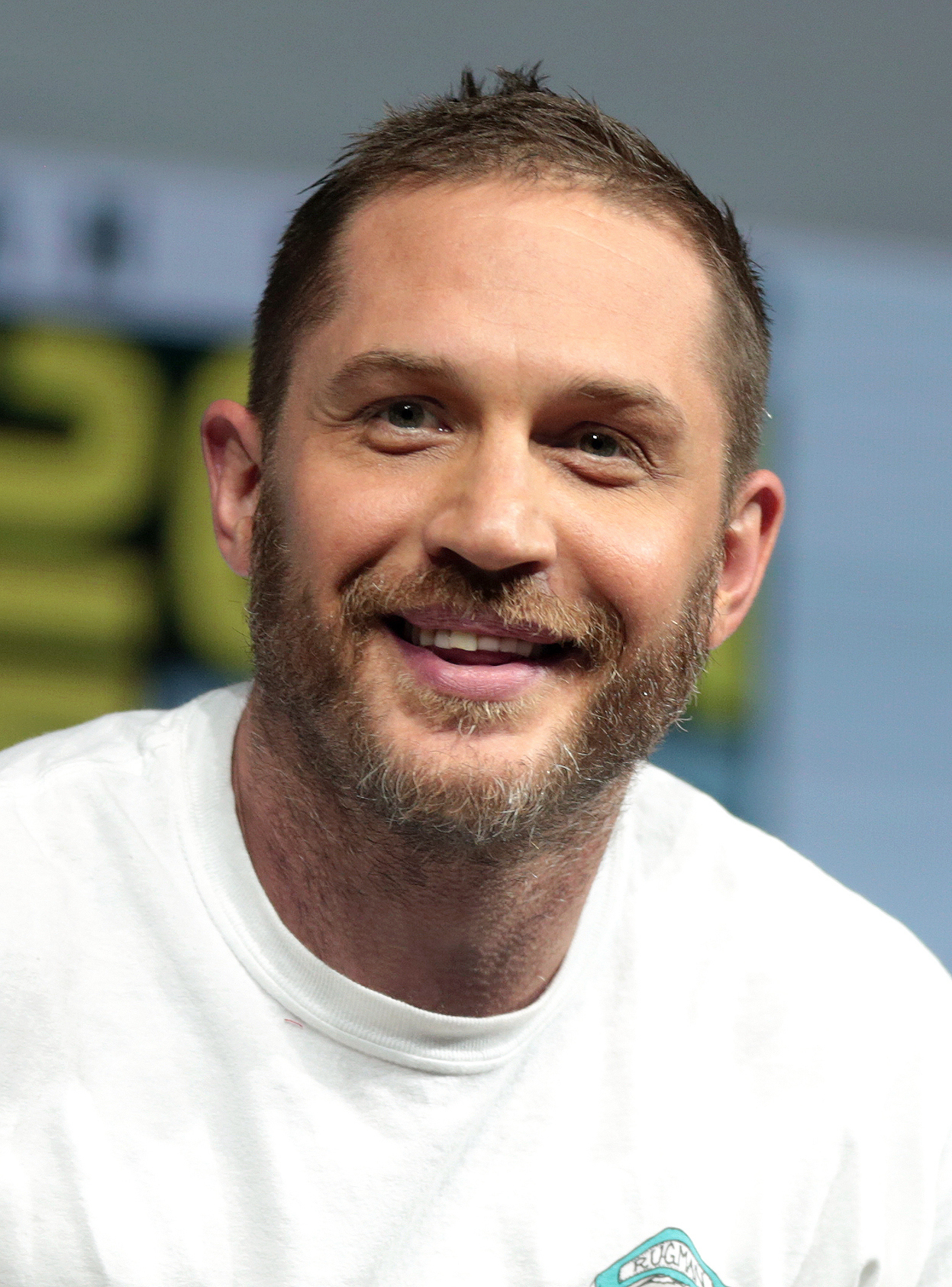
The performances of Leonardo DiCaprio and Tom Hardy garnered widespread critical acclaim, earning them Academy Award nominations for Best Actor and Best Supporting Actor respectively, with DiCaprio winning his category, marking his first Oscar win.

Reviewers cited in a CBS News survey of critics highly praised DiCaprio's performance, referring to it as an "astonishing testament to his commitment to a role" and as an "anchoring performance of ferocious 200 percent commitment". Peter Travers of Rolling Stone called DiCaprio's acting "a virtuoso performance, thrilling in its brute force and silent eloquence". Writing for Vulture, David Edelstein called the film a "tour de force" and "[b]leak as hell but considerably more beautiful", but noted it had "traditional masculinity instead of a search for what illuminates man's inhumanity to man".

Justin Chang of Variety wrote Iñárritu "increasingly succumbs to the air of grim overdetermination that has marred much of [his] past work" and it was "an imposing vision... but also an inflated and emotionally stunted one". Stephanie Zacharek, writing for Time magazine, gave a positive review to the film stating: "Inarritu may have fashioned The Revenant as the ultimate endurance test, but as Glass, DiCaprio simply endures. He gives the movie a beating heart, offering it up, figuratively speaking, alive and bloody on a platter. It—he—is the most visceral effect in the movie: revenge served warm. Bon appetit." Richard Brody of The New Yorker was critical of the film, and said that Emmanuel Lubezki's images were mere "pictorial ornament[s] to Alejandro G. Iñárritu's bland theatrical stagings". A critic for Santa Barbara Independent considered the remake of Man in the Wilderness (1971) to be too much slow paced, leaving the audience cold.

The Revenant was ranked 22nd on Metacritic's and 100th on Rotten Tomatoes' list of best films of 2015.

=== Accolades ===
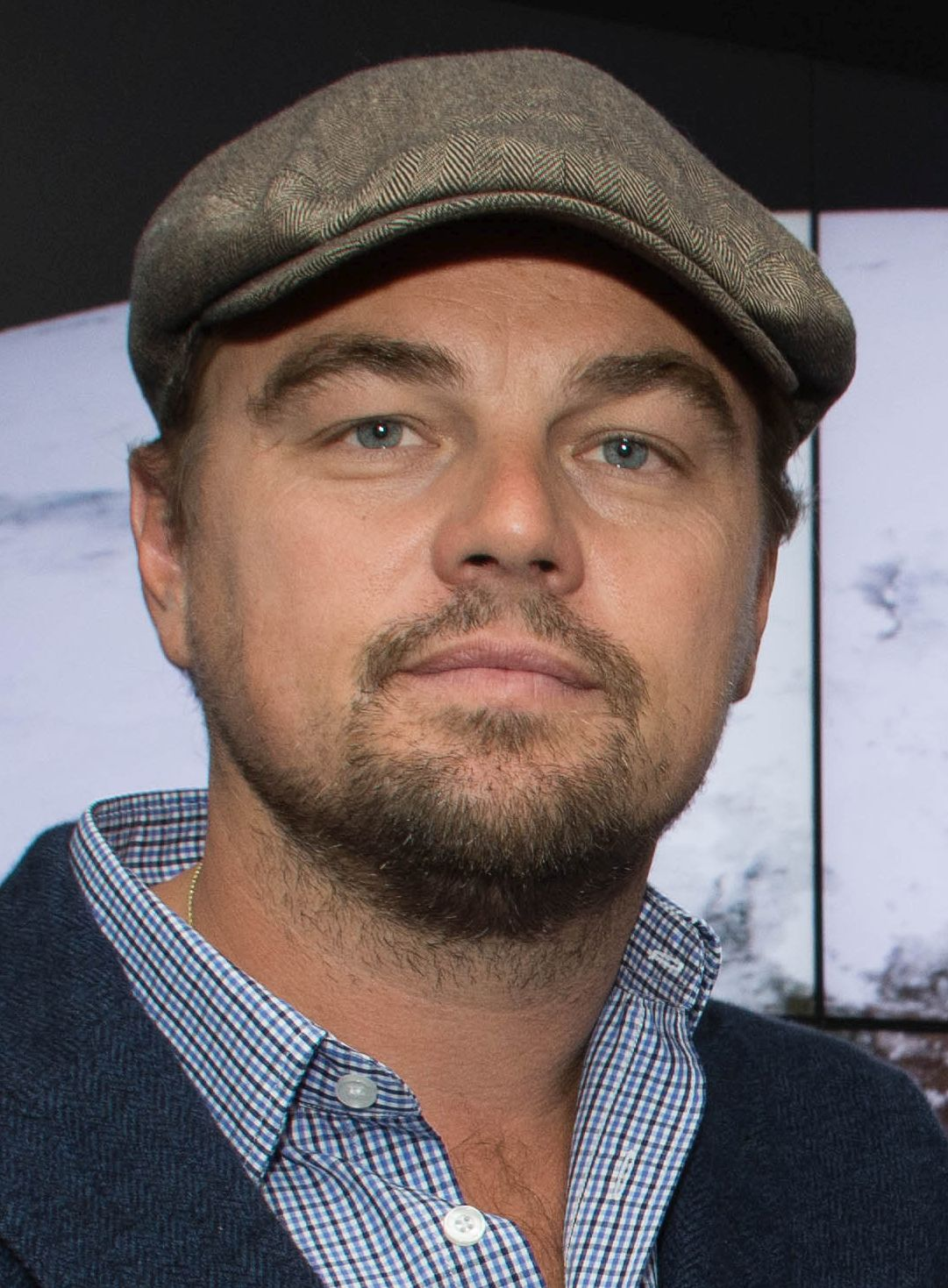
Leonardo DiCaprio's performance was widely acclaimed and ultimately won him the Academy Award for Best Actor, the first of his career after five previous nominations.

The Revenant has received numerous award nominations and wins, particularly for DiCaprio's performance, Iñárritu's direction and Lubezki's cinematography. At the 88th Annual Academy Awards, Iñárritu won Best Director for the second consecutive time, Emmanuel Lubezki won Best Cinematography for the third consecutive time, and DiCaprio won his first award for Best Actor. Hardy lost the award for Best Supporting Actor to Mark Rylance for Bridge of Spies, and the film itself lost Best Picture to Spotlight.

At the 73rd Golden Globe Awards, it won three awards: Best Motion Picture – Drama, Best Director, and Best Actor – Drama. It also had a nomination for Best Original Score. On January 14, 2016, the film received 12 Academy Award nominations (more than any other film at the ceremony), including Best Picture and Best Director, as well as Best Actor and Best Supporting Actor. On February 14, 2016, the film received the most awards at 69th British Academy Film Awards out of eight nominations, with five, including Best Film, Best Director, Best Cinematography, Best Sound, and Best Leading Actor. It received nine Critics' Choice Awards nominations, winning two Best Actor and Best Cinematography.

Tom Hardy won the Best British Actor award at the London Film Critics' Circle and was runner-up for Best Supporting Actor at Dallas–Fort Worth Film Critics Association. DiCaprio was awarded Outstanding Performance by a Male Actor in a Leading Role award at 22nd Screen Actors Guild Awards, and Iñárritu received Outstanding Directing – Feature Film award at 68th Directors Guild of America Awards. It received five Satellite Awards nominations, winning the award of Best Actor for DiCaprio.

On May 2, 2016, Time magazine included both DiCaprio and Iñárritu in its issue of the 100 Most Influential People of 2015, with a cover photograph of DiCaprio on the magazine. John Kerry, then the US Secretary of State, wrote a short testimonial to DiCaprio for this issue of Time stating that DiCaprio's dedication drives him to succeed and "that's how he takes himself back 200 years to create an Oscar-winning, bear-brawling, powerhouse performance in The Revenant."

In July 2025, it was one of the films voted for the "Readers' Choice" edition of The New York Times' list of "The 100 Best Movies of the 21st Century," finishing at number 271.

== See also ==
- Alejandro González Iñárritu filmography
- List of 2015 films based on actual events
- Survival film
- Man in the Wilderness, a 1971 Western film loosely based on the Hugh Glass story
- Lord Grizzly, a 1954 biographical novel by Frederick Manfred, about the Hugh Glass story
- The Song of Hugh Glass, a 1915 poem by John G. Neihardt
