= Michael Punke =

American jurist and lawyer

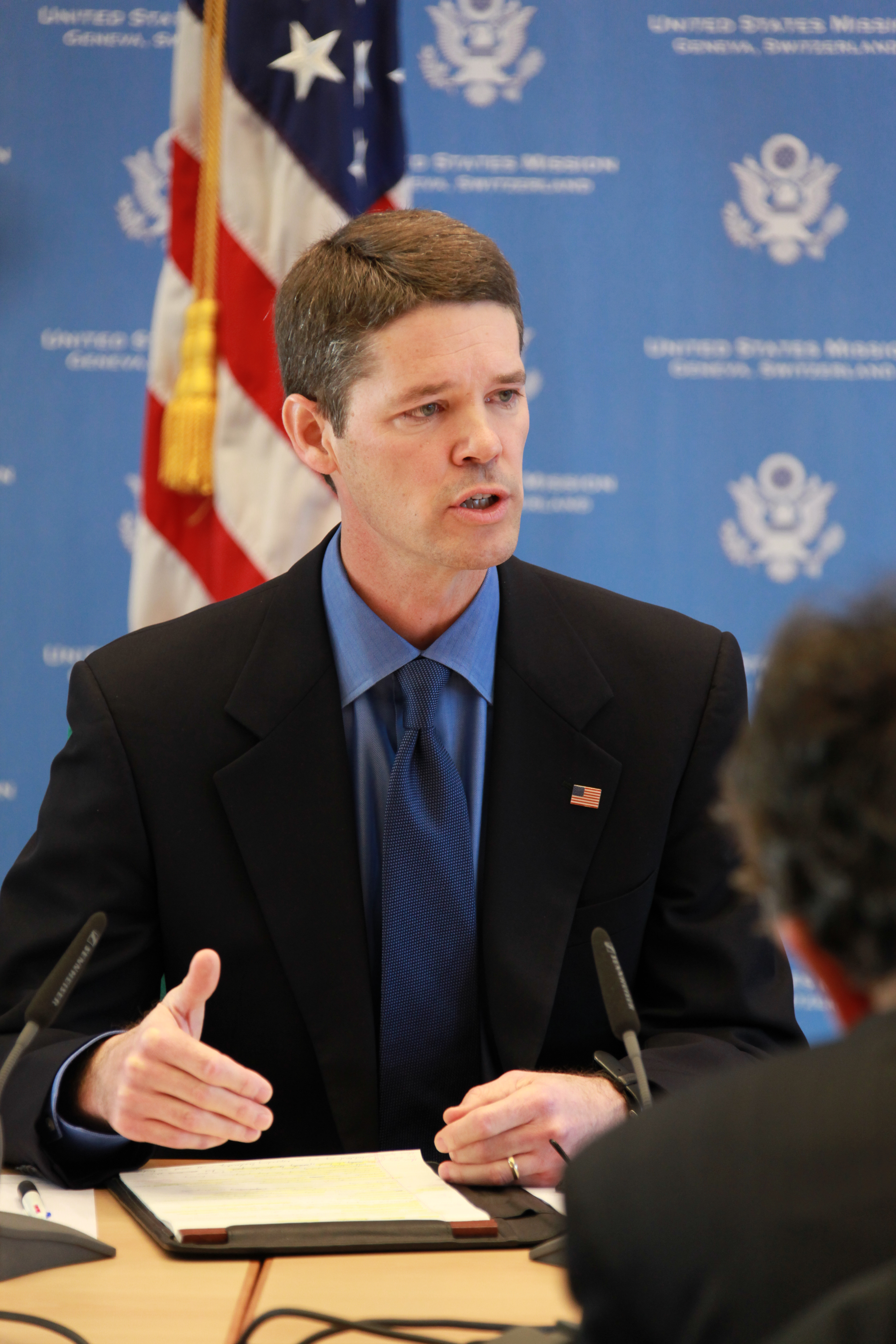

United States Ambassador to the World Trade Organization
- In office April 2010 – January 20, 2017
- President: Barack Obama
- Preceded by: Peter Allgeier
- Succeeded by: Dennis Shea

Personal details
- Born: December 7, 1964 (age 61) Torrington, Wyoming, U.S.
- Party: Democratic
- Spouse: Traci Punke
- Children: 2
- Education: University of Massachusetts, Amherst; George Washington University (BA); Cornell University (JD)
- Occupation: Author; attorney; civil servant
- Writing career
- Period: 2002–present
- Genre: Western
- Notable work: The Revenant: A Novel of Revenge

Michael W. Punke (born December 7, 1964) is an American author, attorney, academic, and policy analyst. He is a former Deputy United States Trade Representative and U.S. Ambassador to the World Trade Organization in Geneva, Switzerland. In 2017, he became vice president for public policy at Amazon Web Services.

As an author, Punke is best known for writing The Revenant: A Novel of Revenge (2002), which was adapted into film as The Revenant (2015), directed by Alejandro González Iñárritu, with a screenplay by Iñárritu and Mark L. Smith, and starring Leonardo DiCaprio and Tom Hardy.

== Early life and education ==
Punke was born and raised in Torrington, Wyoming, the son of Marilyn and Butch Punke, a high school biology teacher. He has a younger brother, Tim, and a sister, Amy. They engaged in various outdoor activities in the wilderness like fishing, hunting, hiking, shooting, and mountain biking. When he was a teenager, he also spent at least three summers working at the Fort Laramie National Historic Site as a "living history interpreter." He was also a debate team champion in high school, which he graduated early from to attend the University of Massachusetts Amherst, later transferring to George Washington University, where he graduated with a degree in International Affairs from the Elliott School of International Affairs. He later attended and received his Juris Doctor degree from Cornell Law School, where he focused on trade law, and was elected to become editor-in-chief of the Cornell International Law Journal.

== Career ==
Upon graduation from Cornell Law in 1989, Punke worked as a government staffer for Senator Max Baucus (D-Montana), who was later ambassador to China. Specifically, from 1991–92, Punke served as international trade counsel to Baucus, who was also then chairman of the Senate Finance Committee's International Trade Subcommittee. Punke also met his wife Traci while working for Baucus. During 1993–95, Punke then served at the White House as director for international economic affairs and was jointly appointed to the National Economic Council and the National Security Council.

=== Work at the Office of the United States Trade Representative ===
In 1995–96, Punke became a Senior Policy Advisor at the Office of the United States Trade Representative (the USTR), where he advised them on issues ranging from intellectual property (IP) law to trade to agricultural law. Punke has also worked on international trade issues from the private sector, including as a partner at the Washington, D.C., office of Mayer, Brown, Rowe, & Maw. From 2003 to 2009, Punke consulted on public policy issues out of Missoula, Montana.

In 2009, President Barack Obama selected Punke to serve as the Deputy United States Trade Representative and U.S. Ambassador and Permanent Representative to the World Trade Organization (WTO) in Geneva, Switzerland. Obama's selection of Punke for this position was also confirmed by the U.S. Senate in 2011.

=== Private sector work ===
Punke has been a partner at the law firm of Mayer Brown, resident in the Washington, D.C. office and working on various matters involving international trade law. In the years of 2003 to 2009, Punke served as a consultant on various public policy matters and was also based in Missoula, Montana. In February 2017, Punke joined Amazon Web Services as Vice President for Global Public Policy.

== Writing ==
=== The Revenant: A Novel of Revenge ===
Punke is the author of The Revenant: A Novel of Revenge, which was published by Carroll & Graf in 2002. He came up with the idea to write the novel while on an airplane, after reading a couple of lines in a history book about real-life frontier fur trapper Hugh Glass. Punke was also working at the law firm of Mayer Brown at the time when he started the book (1997), so he would go to the office as early as 5:00 AM before anyone else got there to write pages for roughly three hours, and then do his job for eight to ten hours. The book took a total of four years to complete and according to his brother Tim, Punke actually caught pneumonia at least four times during the writing process. Punke also performed extensive research on Glass, which included setting up and testing real hunting traps. The book was published in 2002 to little fanfare, although Punke was able to sell movie rights to it. Once he discovered the novel, Director Alejandro G. Iñárritu fought for it to be made into a movie, where other directors such as Park Chan-Wook and producers such as Megan Ellison were also attached.

After Punke relocated with his wife Traci and their two children to Missoula, Montana, where he worked part-time as a policy consultant and an adjunct professor at the University of Montana, he finished two screenplays as well as two non-fiction books, one about the fight to save the Buffalo – Last Stand (2007) – and the other about a mining disaster that occurred in North Butte, Montana – Fire and Brimstone: The North Butte Mining Disaster of 1917 (2013).

During his time as ambassador to the WTO, Punke was permitted to receive royalties from sales of his books, though he was prohibited from promoting them in any way, due to ethics policies preventing federal officials from self-enrichment. As his tenure coincided with the 2015 release of the film adaptation of The Revenant, he did not attend any public or promotional events related to the film. Instead, family members represented and spoke for him during that time.

=== Fire and Brimstone: The North Butte Mining Disaster of 1917 ===
In 2006, Punke published a non-fiction book, via Hachette Books, that covered a mining disaster that occurred in North Butte, Montana during 1917. The book was a finalist for the Mountains and Plains Booksellers Award. A reprint edition was also published in 2007. The book has received favorable reviews from Publishers Weekly, Booklist, Kirkus Reviews and other sources.

=== Last Stand ===
HarperCollins published Punke's non-fiction book about saving the Buffalo – Last Stand – in 2007. The subtitle of the book is "George Bird Grinnell, the Battle to Save the Buffalo, and the Birth of the New West."

=== Other writing work ===
Punke wrote the introduction to a contemporary reprint of Mari Sandoz's 1954 book, The Buffalo Hunters: The Story of the Hide Men. He was the historical correspondent for Montana Quarterly magazine.

== Television ==
Punke appeared in the 2023 Ken Burns documentary The American Buffalo.

== Bibliography ==
=== Fiction ===
- The Revenant: A Novel of Revenge (2002)
- Ridgeline (2021)

=== Non-fiction ===
- Fire and Brimstone: The North Butte Mining Disaster of 1917 (2006), ISBN 1401308899
- Last Stand (2007)

Diplomatic posts
Preceded by Peter Allgeier	United States Ambassador to the World Trade Organization; 2010–2017	Succeeded by Dennis Shea
