= The Divine Enchantment =

Poem

The Divine Enchantment is John Neihardt's earliest narrative poem, first published in 1900. The poem is divided into ten cantos, and uses a variety of rhyming styles.

== Introduction ==
When the Princess Devanaguy falls into a deep trance-like sleep, she is visited by the god Vishnu: who causes her to fall pregnant with his holy child, Christna.

Devanaguy's sleep is prolonged supernaturally by Vishnu: allowing the god to relate to her his divine secrets through a series of ecstatic visions. Among the mysteries revealed to Devanaguy, she is shown how the gods will shortly powerfully intervene directly in human affairs. When the princess finally re-awakens she is awestruck by her experiences, and bursts into a spontaneous rhapsody of praise.
