= Edward Rose (fur trapper) =

American fur trapper, explorer and interpreter

Edward Rose (b. circa 1780–1788, d. 1833) was an early American explorer, trapper, guide and interpreter. During his life, Rose alternated between residing with Native American tribes and working on behalf of commercial fur trapping expeditions funded by Eastern companies. His position at the intersection of these cultures made him a sought-after facilitator of communication and exchange of goods.

== Early life ==
Much of Rose's early life is obscure, but it is known that "he was a half breed" and "his color was not far from that of the savage; black hair, changeable eyes, and a fiendish expression of countenance, when he chose it, with a little paint, gave him the appearance of a natural born Indian." Historians believe that he worked along parts of the Mississippi River, ranging between Illinois and New Orleans, and that when he was young, he lived among the Crow Indians, adopting their heritage, language, religions, and customs. He grew up near Louisville, Kentucky.

As a young man, Rose travelled to the city of New Orleans while working as a keelboat deckhand. By the time he reached the age of eighteen, he was known to have participated in robberies and fights in the city

The scars and visible signs of his brawling inspired the Crow to call him Nez Coupé, or "Cut Nose."

== Fur trapping ==
=== Rose and Manuel Lisa ===
Rose got his first job in the trapping industry in 1807. He was hired as an interpreter for an expedition to the Bighorn River in modern-day Wyoming under the command of American explorer Manuel Lisa. Upon gaining his confidence, Rose was sent by Lisa, together with George Drouillard, to scout the area, build relationships with local Native American communities, and publicize Fort Raymond, the trading post Lisa's group had established. Drouillard covered around 500 miles, while Rose made it to the local Crow village and set up camp for the winter.

During his time with the Crow, Rose was trading Lisa's goods for favours from the tribe. Upon his return to camp, likely in July 1808, Rose came into conflict with Lisa over the misuse of trade goods, leading to a physical altercation between the two men. Expedition member John Potts attempted to intervene, but it reportedly took ten or fifteen men to prevent Rose from firing on the fleeing Lisa with a swivel gun. Rose stayed at the camp only to procure more goods to trade, and then returned to the Crow village.

=== Crow village and Andrew Henry ===
During his brief stay at the Crow village, the tribe was involved in a small battle against the neighbouring Hidatsa tribe. The Crow were in disarray, with some among their ranks having abandoned the fight and others preparing to follow suit. Rose purportedly grabbed two shields, an axe, and a knife and charged at the Hidatsa fort. His shield was struck by three bullets, and Rose fell momentarily, but soon got up and resumed combat. He killed three men with his axe and wounded two others who died soon thereafter, for which he earned a new nickname, "The Five Scalps". Rose was viewed as a fierce, brave, and fearless warrior by the Crow after this encounter.

In the years that followed, Rose was equally content to live among the Crow or among mountain men, meeting with both groups to work as an explorer and trapper. Later in 1809, Rose worked for Lisa's partner Andrew Henry at a trading post in present-day North Dakota. Henry employed Rose as an interpreter through the Crow territory for a few years during expeditions through Montana and into some parts of Idaho, with Rose's partnership becoming an important asset to him. After earning Henry's trust, Rose took a large number of supplies and goods to be traded, and headed back to the Crow people.

=== Wilson Price Hunt ===
In 1811, Wilson Price Hunt hired Rose to join an expedition. Hunt was trying to expand John Jacob Astor's fur business. Hunt knew about Rose's history of theft and desertion on prior expeditions and took precautions to prevent Rose from derailing his mission. Hunt initially designated guards to protect their goods against theft, but eventually became more concerned with the risk of Rose involving other men in a plot to steal the goods.

After a days-long trading negotiation with a group of Crows at Crazy Woman Creek ended without success, Hunt suspected Rose had been disloyal and blamed him for the failure. Hunt offered Rose half a year's pay, a horse, three beaver traps, and other goods to leave the expedition. After Rose left, Hunt's party lost their course in the Bighorn mountains. Despite the tensions that had led to his departure, Rose reappeared in the following days and helped them reorient and find the proper path.

In the following years, Rose lived in the Omaha village, where he married the chief's daughter. He enjoyed an elevated social standing within the tribe due to his prosperity following the expedition with Hunt. During these years in Omaha village, Rose fathered two children. He became an alcoholic, and, when intoxicated, was known to instigate fights. This eventually caused problems for both the Omaha and the traders, so he was arrested and sent to St. Louis. After his release, Rose travelled back to New Orleans, returned to the Crow, and stayed with them for close to ten years.

=== William Ashley ===
In 1823, Rose was hired again as an interpreter for an expedition led by William Ashley to the Rocky Mountains. During the expedition, Ashley's group came into contact with the Arikara Indians. The year prior, two Arikara warriors had been murdered by members of another fur trading company, leading them to distrust Ashley's expedition. For two days, the groups maintained distance and avoided conflict, but when a few members of Ashley's expedition, including Rose, ventured into the Arikara village, a skirmish broke out and one of the trappers was killed. Rose returned to camp and delivered a report to Ashley. Although some among the expedition wanted vengeance, Ashley resolved to wait overnight in the camp. The next morning, Arikara warriors attacked the camp and opened fire on the trappers, killing 15 and wounding 9, forcing the expedition to flee downriver. With these losses, and facing insolvency, the expedition had to be abandoned.

After this failure, Ashley decided to pursue a land route to find fur in the mountains, instead of a path along the Arikara-controlled Missouri River. He hired Jedidiah Smith to lead a party, in which Rose served as a guide and interpreter. They traveled northwest in 1823-1824 along a route that would become the Bozeman Trail, then crossed the Bighorns into the Wind River Valley. Rose facilitated horse trading along the way, and successfully negotiated with the Crows for passage through South Pass to the Green River beaver grounds.

== Death ==
Rose died during the winter of 1832–1833. He was accompanying Hugh Glass and Hilain Menard on a journey on behalf of the American Fur Company that was intended to take them from Fort Cass, at the mouth of the Bighorn River, to Fort Union. As the three men crossed the frozen Yellowstone River, they were attacked by a group of Arikara warriors and killed.
