= Fort Kiowa =

19th-century fur trading post in South Dakota, United States

Fort Kiowa, officially Fort Lookout and also called Fort Brazeau/Brasseaux, was a 19th-century fur trading post located on the Missouri River between modern Chamberlain, South Dakota, and the Big Bend of the Missouri.

Built in 1822 by the Columbia Fur Company to serve the expanding fur trade in the American West, the square 140-by-140-foot (43 by 43 m) fort served as an important rest stop and trading post for trappers and explorers such as Jim Bridger and Hugh Glass. In the early 1840s, as the American fur trade moved further west, Fort Kiowa was abandoned. It was eventually flooded by the Missouri River, and today the site of the building is submerged beneath the man-made reservoir of Lake Francis Case.

== Early history ==
Following the Louisiana Purchase in 1803, the size of the United States nearly doubled and the fur trade quickly sought to profit from the unexplored new territory. Forts sprung up along rivers and overland trails to act as parts of a burgeoning factory system. The factory system was a nationally funded and operated trade network, in which Indigenous People would meet at certain forts and exchange furs for finished goods. The American government had hoped that nationalizing the fur trade would prevent the debauchery caused by the trading of alcohol with the natives. The factory system eventually failed for many reasons. First, the men working the factories were ex-military men and not experienced fur traders. These men often mishandled the furs resulting in major profit shifts. Second, the government failed to stop all private traders who bribed natives with alcohol. Eager to get access to liquor, the natives would break treaties with the government to get it. Lastly, the factories were not permitted to give gifts to natives or assimilate into native culture as many private fur traders could. Miscegenation was a major uniting force between private fur traders and natives that strengthened their relationship.

With the demise of the factory system, private companies emerged and made large sums of money. Included in these were Manuel Lisa of the Missouri Fur Company and John Jacob Astor of the American Fur Company. These men were two of the richest men in America during this time. These private companies established forts that acted as rest stops for trappers. Among the most well-regarded forts was Fort Kiowa, also known as Fort Lookout.

Fort Kiowa was constructed in 1822 by Joseph Brazeau Jr. of the Berthold, Chouteau, and Pratte French Company. Brazeau fortified the ~20,000-square-foot complex with a blockhouse and watchtower to guard against Crow and Sioux attacks. Fort Kiowa soon became known as the jumping-off point for the 1823 trading expedition known as "Ashley's Hundred", which included traders Hugh Glass and Jim Bridger. Several months after the journey began, Glass was brutally attacked by a grizzly bear. Glass was able to kill the bear, but suffered many serious life-threatening wounds in the process. Two of Glass’ companions were instructed to remain with Glass until he died, and then bury him before reuniting with the rest of the party. However, the pair were allegedly chased off by a group of Arikaree natives, and Glass was left alone to die.

Bridger returned to the hunting party and reported to his commander that Glass had perished. However, Glass survived and was able to set his own wounds and crawl more than 200 miles back to Fort Kiowa. This feat and others where pioneers such as Adam Helmer showed perseverance despite harsh challenges in the wild have maintained a special place in the folklore of the American West.

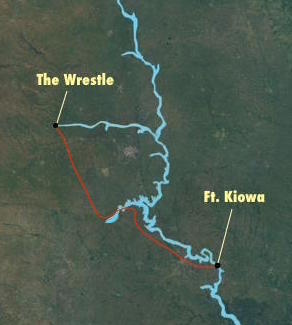
Hugh Glass' route to Fort Kiowa

== Late history ==
In 1827, Bernard Pratte purchased Fort Kiowa from Brazeau and made significant improvements. Pratte added several four room log houses, a storehouse, and a smith shop. Furthermore, Pratte encircled the fort with a wooden picket fence roughly twenty or thirty feet high to prevent Native attacks. Thus fortified, Fort Kiowa was expanded into a major trading post for Natives in the region.

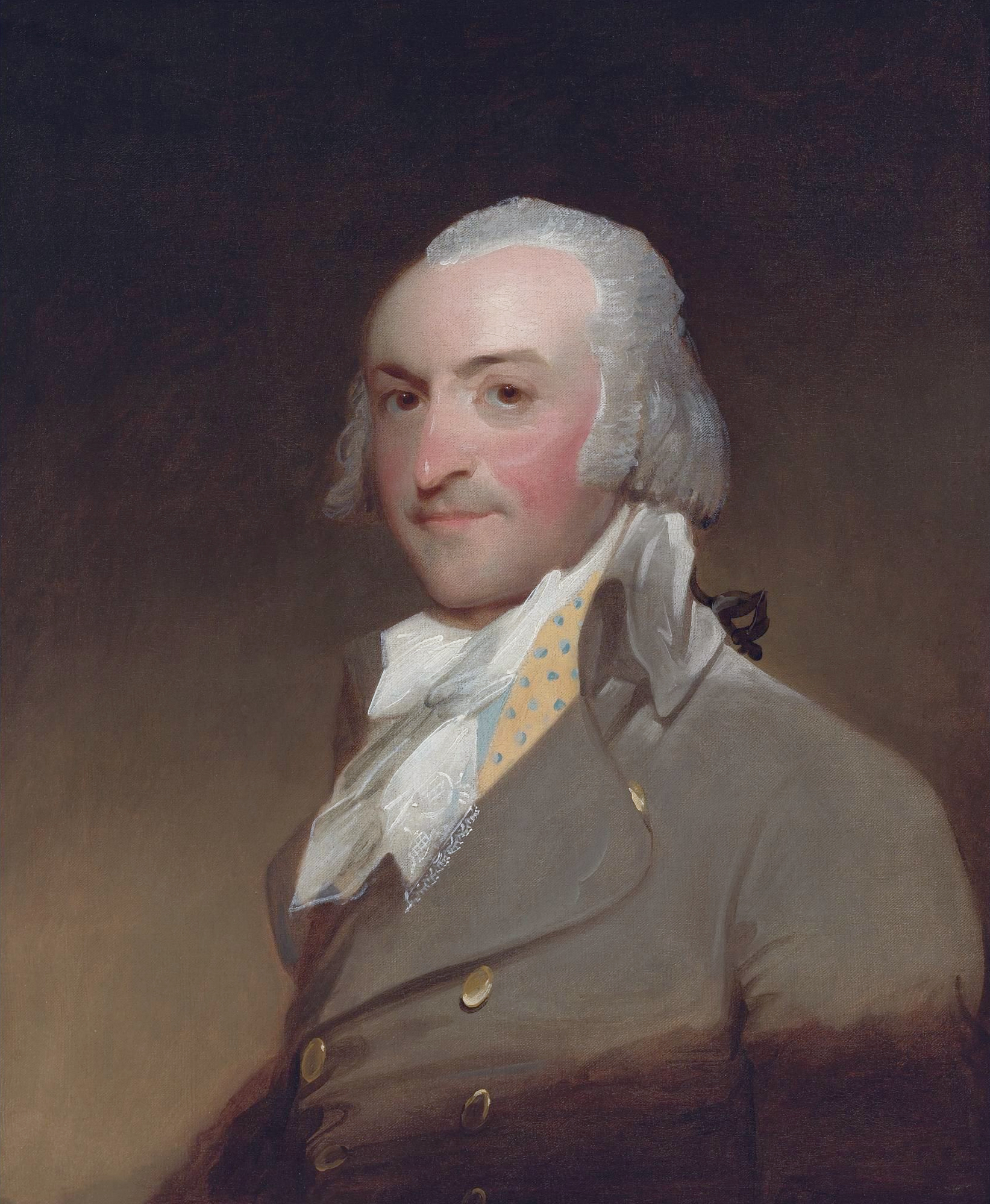
Oil Painting of John Jacob Astor

Later in the same year, John Jacob Astor purchased Fort Kiowa from Pratte for his rapidly expanding American Fur Company. Astor, who was the first multi-millionaire in America, bought Fort Kiowa to establish his presence in the upper Missouri and to further his monopoly on the American fur trade. Astor found the upper Missouri river area to be extremely prosperous. However, in the late 1830s, Astor’s American Fur Company was forced to abandon Fort Kiowa as the once lucrative fur trading business was no longer profitable due to several factors. First, there was a scarcity of beaver caused by rapid overhunting by intruding trappers. Second, there was a lack of public demand in America and Europe for pelts, as a new style, silk hats, was gaining prominence. Lastly, the intrusion of American trappers on what natives perceived as their land angered native tribes who began to revolt against the trappers. As supply and demand both declined, fur trading in America faced extinction.

In 1840, Joseph LaBarge, a former steamboat captain, bought Fort Kiowa as a wintering post and Indian Agency. LaBarge housed many Indian agents whose job was to monitor and control trade between Native tribes and Euro-Americans. These agents lost popularity among the latter, who tended to view them as exploiters of the Native peoples, corrupt leaders who acted in their own interests. Popular opinion was relatively accurate as many Indian Agents were replaced during the 1840s after corruption was discovered. Under LaBarge’s ownership, Fort Kiowa was an unsuccessful venture, and as a result he abandoned it within the year. LaBarge is the last known inhabitant of Fort Kiowa.

== Today ==
Fort Kiowa is currently underwater, possibly submerged under a dam reservoir, Lake Francis Case. The area where Fort Kiowa once stood is recognized as a National Historic Fort of South Dakota. Fort Kiowa is advertised as a tourist attraction in which adventure-seeking tourists can follow the same path Hugh Glass did in 1823.

The 2015 film The Revenant is based on the life of Hugh Glass, and features Fort Kiowa as a major location.
