= The Revenant (novel) =

Book by Michael Punke

The Revenant: A Novel of Revenge
- Hardcover edition
- Author: Michael Punke
- Language: English
- Subject: Hugh Glass
- Genre: Historical fiction
- Publisher: Carroll & Graf
- Publication date: 2002
- Publication place: United States
- Media type: Print, e-book
- Pages: 272 pp.
- ISBN: 978-1250066626
- OCLC: 885224613

The Revenant: A Novel of Revenge is a 2002 novel by American author Michael Punke, based on a series of events in the life of American frontiersman Hugh Glass in 1823 Missouri Territory. The word "revenant" means someone who has risen from the grave to terrorize the living.

The novel was later adapted as a screenplay for a 2015 feature film directed by Alejandro G. Iñárritu. The novel was republished in January 2015 in anticipation of the upcoming film release.

== Development ==
Many of the outdoor adventures depicted in the novel are based on Punke's outdoor interests and hobbies, such as fishing and exploring the backcountry, which he enjoyed while growing up in Wyoming. Punke had originally intended to write a political novel. He started archival research and writing in 1997, and it took four years for him to complete the novel, with the long hours taking a toll on his health. Maxim reporter Walter Bonner interviewed Punke's brother who described the novel as an attempt by Punke to "write his way out of D.C. and back to the big sky country". The novel is dedicated to his high school English teacher, Roger Clark.

The novel was republished in January 2015 in anticipation of the upcoming film release, but Punke's role as an ambassador to the World Trade Organization (WTO) prevented him from participating in pre-release publicity.

== Critical reception ==
Reception of the novel has been largely positive. Publishers Weekly described the novel as "Told in simple expository language, this is a spellbinding tale of heroism and obsessive retribution." Similarly, Kirkus Reviews called the novel "A good adventure yarn, with plenty of historical atmosphere and local color." Writer William Nauenberg describes the story as "the epitome of determination and willpower in action."

When reviewing the novel for its 2015 re-release to coincide with the film, critic Brian Ted Jones described the novel as not fulfilling the expectation of "the novel's higher bar", describing it as more like Punke's non-fiction, and stylistically not very well executed. Jones also described the novel's subtitle "A Novel of Revenge", as misrepresentative, claiming the novel's real plot device "is actually more prosaic: He wants his stuff back." A review of the same edition by Library Journal, called the novel "A must-read for fans of Westerns and frontier fiction and recommended for anyone interested in stories that test the limit of how much the human body and spirit can endure."

== Film adaptation ==
Development of The Revenant began in August 2001, with producer Akiva Goldsman acquiring the rights to Punke's unpublished manuscript for The Revenant. David Rabe wrote the first script. The production was picked up by Park Chan-wook, who had Samuel L. Jackson in mind to star. Park later left the project.

Development stalled until 2010, when Mark L. Smith wrote a new adaptation. Alejandro G. Iñárritu signed on to direct in August 2011. Weed Road Pictures, New Regency Productions, Anonymous Content, and 20th Century Fox supported development and distribution of the film. Leonardo DiCaprio and Tom Hardy were cast in the lead roles. The film had a limited release in the United States on December 25, 2015, and had its wide release in the United States on January 8, 2016.

After the novel was optioned for adaptation, publishers chose to republish it in hardback in January 2015. However, because Punke had become a Deputy United States Trade Representative and US Ambassador to the World Trade Organization, the State Department prohibited him from doing any publicity for his book in preparation for the film release (one representative noted that "He can't even sign copies").
