= Peter Allgeier =

American trade representative

Peter Frederick Allgeier
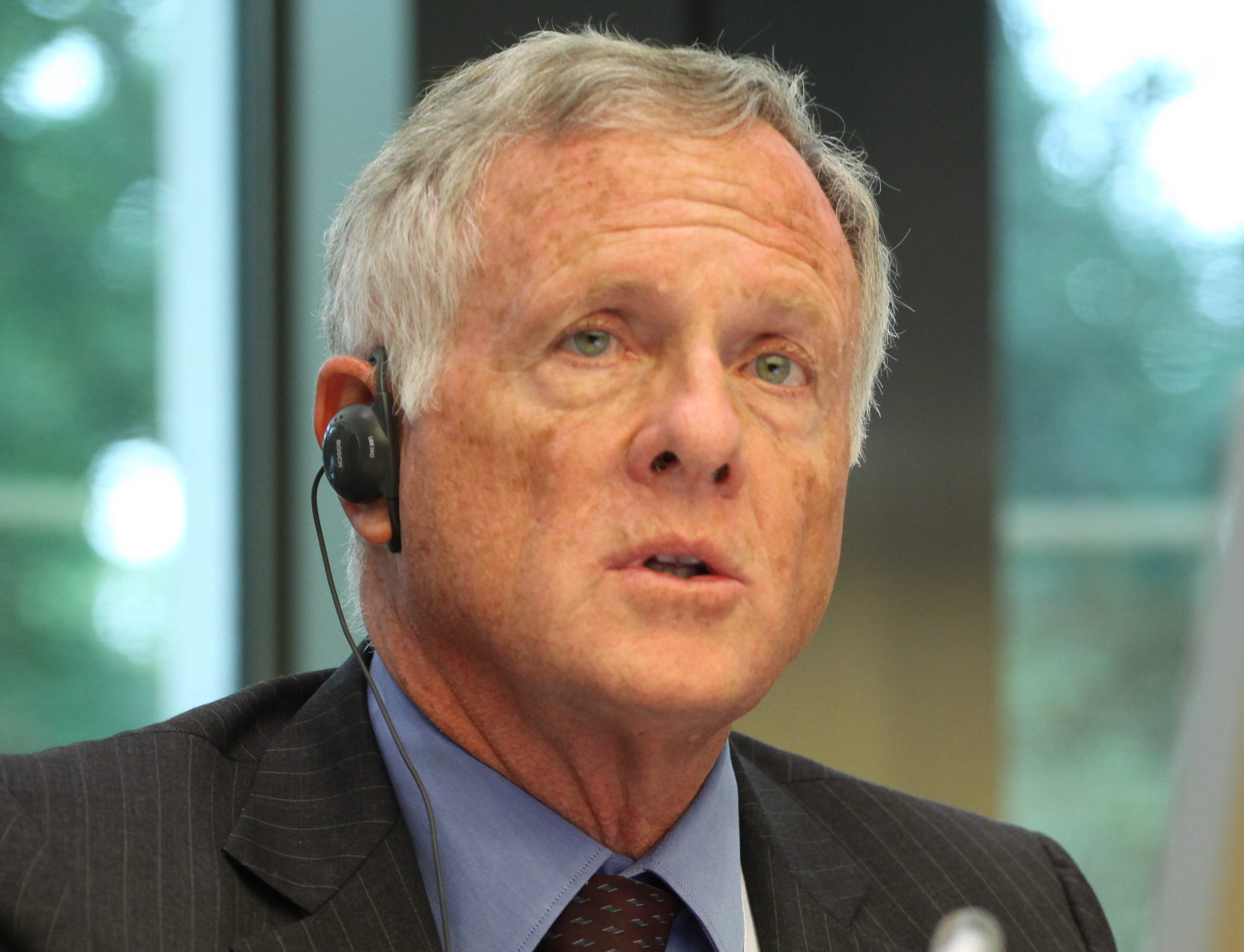

United States Trade Representative Acting
- In office January 20, 2009 – March 18, 2009
- President: Barack Obama
- Preceded by: Susan Schwab
- Succeeded by: Ron Kirk
- In office February 18, 2005 – April 29, 2005
- President: George W. Bush
- Preceded by: Robert Zoellick
- Succeeded by: Rob Portman

Peter Frederick Allgeier (born May 17, 1947) was the U.S. Deputy Trade Representative from May 2001 until August 2009. Allgeier was also the President of C&M International, Ltd., an affiliate of Crowell & Moring LLP, a law firm with offices in Washington, D.C., California, New York, Brussels, and London. He has been the President of the Coalition of Services Industries (CSI) since 2012.

== Education ==
Allgeier graduated cum laude from Brown University with an A.B in international relations and earned a master's degree in international relations from the School of Advanced International Studies at Johns Hopkins University. He received a PhD in economics from the University of North Carolina at Chapel Hill. He was also a visiting instructor at Duke University and a Rockefeller Fellow at Harvard Divinity School.

== Career ==
Allgeier joined the U.S. Trade Representative in June 1980, as an international economist dealing with Asia, serving in 1981 as Director for Japanese Affairs. Between 1981 and 1985 he was Deputy Assistant Trade Representative for Asia and the Pacific. In 1985 he became Assistant Trade Representative for Asia and the Pacific. In 1989 he became Assistant Trade Representative for Europe and the Mediterranean. In 1995 he was appointed Associate U.S Trade Representative for the Western Hemisphere by USTR Mickey Kantor. As a U.S Trade Representative, Allgeier was accused of intimidating other countries to back down from tobacco control measures, including making efforts to get Korea and Taiwan to back down on marketing restrictions to children.

Allgeier has conducted major trade negotiations with countries throughout Asia, Europe (including the former Soviet Union), the Middle East, Canada, Latin America, and the Caribbean, and in multilateral organizations, including the UN, WTO, and OECD.

Allgeier was nominated by President George W. Bush as Deputy U.S.Trade Representative and confirmed by the United States Senate on May 26, 2001. He also served twice as Acting U.S. Trade Representative, during two transitions, in 2005 and in 2009. In 2005, he was appointed United States Ambassador to the World Trade Organization in Geneva.

As President of C&M International, Allgeier lobbied against anti-smoking laws around the world. When questioned about Allgeier's lobbying, the CEO of British American Tobacco Australia would not comment on whether his company is directly connected to it. C&M International has a history of working with the tobacco industry, and has strong links to tobacco company Philip Morris. Allgeier has been described as the "private face" of the tobacco industry. According to Steve Cannane from the Australian Broadcasting Corporation, Allgeier turned down a request from Lateline in 2011 to comment on or be interviewed about his lobbying against anti-smoking laws.

In 2020, Allgeier, along with over 130 other former Republican national security officials, signed a statement that asserted that President Trump was unfit to serve another term, and "To that end, we are firmly convinced that it is in the best interest of our nation that Vice President Joe Biden be elected as the next President of the United States, and we will vote for him."

Political offices
Preceded by Robert Zoellick	United States Trade Representative; Acting; 2005	Succeeded by Rob Portman
Preceded by Susan Schwab	United States Trade Representative; Acting; 2009	Succeeded by Ron Kirk
