= John G. Neihardt =

American poet

John Gneisenau Neihardt (January 8, 1881 – November 3, 1973) was an American writer and poet, amateur historian and ethnographer. Born at the end of the American settlement of the Plains, he became interested in the lives of those who had been a part of the European-American migration, as well as the Indigenous peoples whom they had displaced.

His best-known work is Black Elk Speaks (1932), which Neihardt presents as an extended narration of the visions of the Lakota medicine man Black Elk. It was translated into German as Ich rufe mein Volk (I Call My People) (1953). In the United States, the book was reprinted in 1961, at the beginning of an increase in non-Native interest in Native American cultures. Its widespread popularity has supported four other editions. In 2008 the State University of New York published the book in a premier, annotated edition. However, the accuracy of the book is controversial.

== Biography ==
Neihardt was born in Sharpsburg, Illinois. He published his first book, The Divine Enchantment, at the age of 19. The book is based on Hindu mysticism.

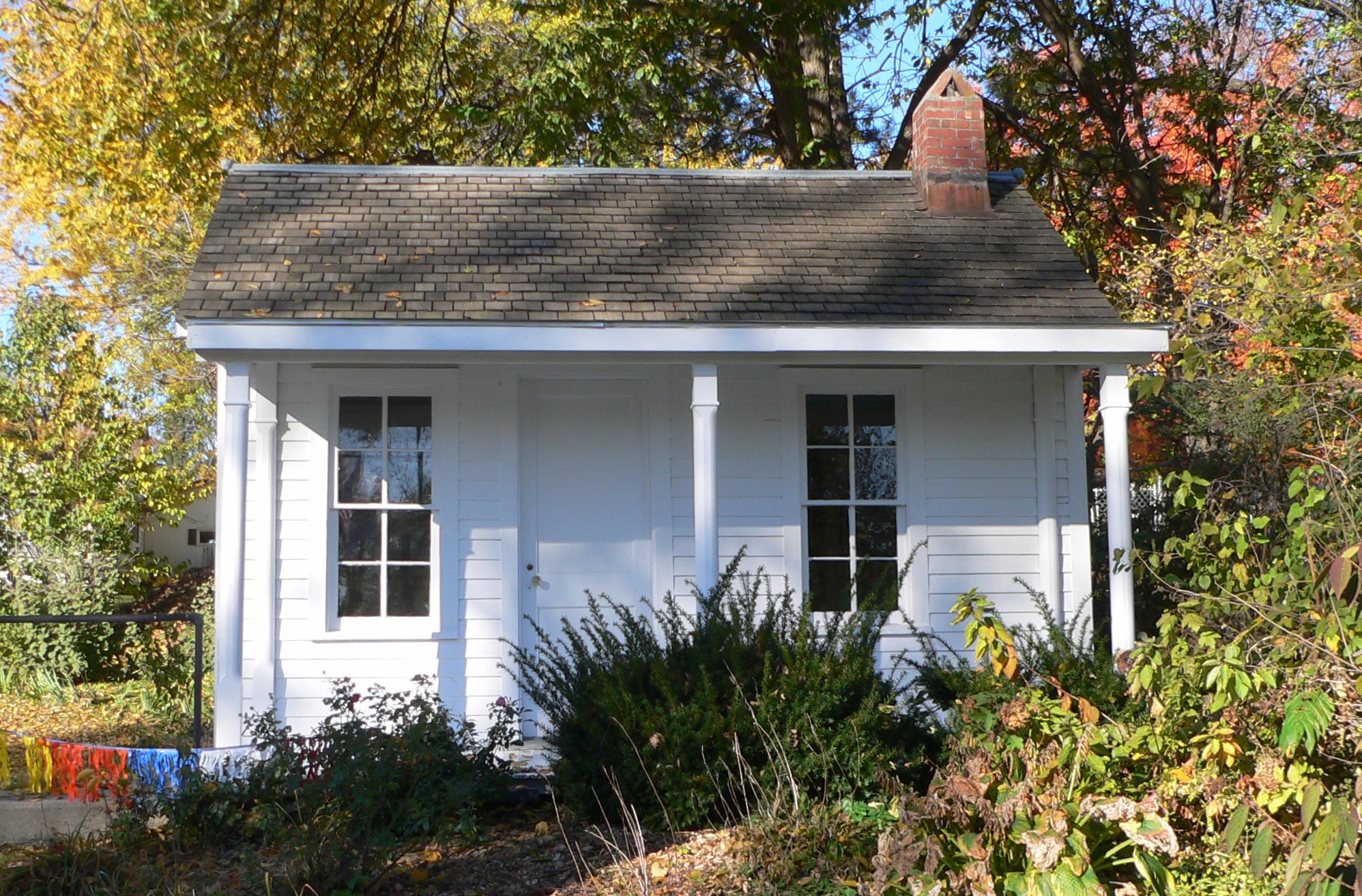
Neihardt's study in Bancroft

In 1901, Neihardt moved to Bancroft, Nebraska, on the edge of the Omaha Reservation, beginning a lifelong fascination with Indian cultures. He also co-owned and edited the local newspaper, the Bancroft Blade. After a trip to the Black Hills, Neihardt published A Bundle of Myrrh, romantic poetry in free verse.

In 1920, Neihardt moved to Branson, Missouri. In the summer of 1930, as part of his research into the American Indian Ghost Dance movement, Neihardt contacted an Oglala holy man named Black Elk. Neihardt developed the book Black Elk Speaks from their conversations, which continued in the spring of 1931, and published it in 1932. It is now Neihardt's best known work. The book was translated into German in 1953. In the United States, it was reprinted in 1961 and there have been four additional editions. In 2008 the State University of New York Press published a premier edition of the book, with annotations. However, the accuracy of the book is controversial.

Neihardt served as a professor of poetry at the University of Nebraska, and a literary editor in St. Louis, Missouri. He was a poet-in-residence and lecturer at the University of Missouri in Columbia, Missouri from 1948 on.

In 1971 and 1972 Neihardt appeared on The Dick Cavett Show, spurring renewed interest in Black Elk Speaks.

Neihardt died in 1973.

=== Controversy surrounding Black Elk Speaks ===
Though Black Elk was Oglala Lakota, the book Black Elk Speaks was written by Neihardt, a non-Native. While the book is lauded by non-Native audiences, and has been inspirational to many New Age groups, some Lakota people and Native American scholars do not consider the book to be representative of Lakota beliefs. They have questioned the accuracy of the account, which has elements of a collaborative autobiography, spiritual text, and other genres. The Indiana University professor Raymond DeMallie, who has studied the Lakota by cultural and linguistic resources, published "The Sixth Grandfather" in 1985 including the original transcripts of the conversations with Black Elk, plus his own introduction, analysis and notes. He has questioned whether Neihardt's account is accurate and fully represents the views or words of Black Elk.

The primary criticism made by DeMallie and similar scholars is that Neihardt, as the author and editor, may have exaggerated or altered some parts of the story to make it more accessible and marketable to the intended white audience of the 1930s, or because he did not fully understand the Lakota context. Late twentieth-century editions of the book by Nebraska University Press have addressed this issue by entitling the book as Black Elk Speaks, as told through John G. Neihardt (aka "Flaming Rainbow").

== Legacy and honors ==
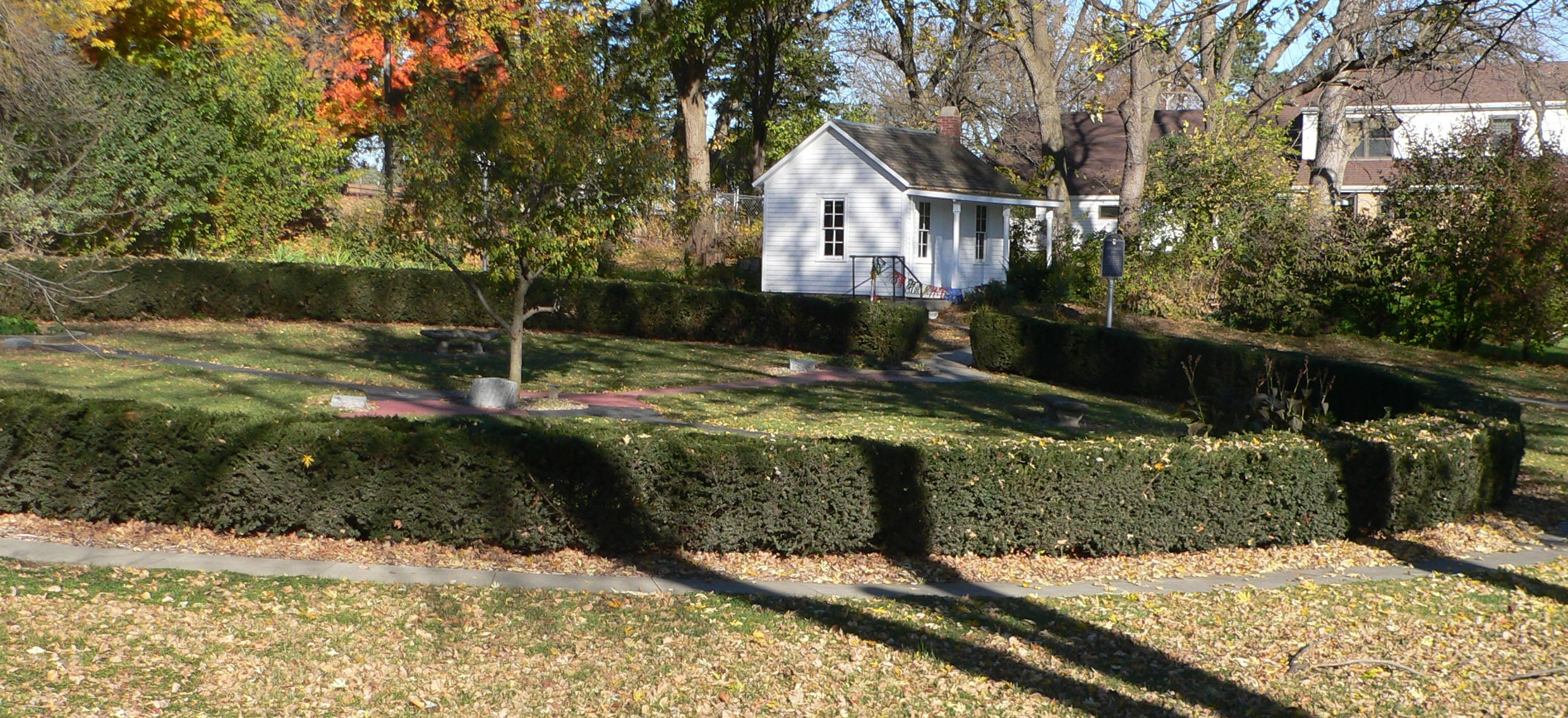
Neihardt's study and garden at Neihardt Center in Bancroft, Nebraska

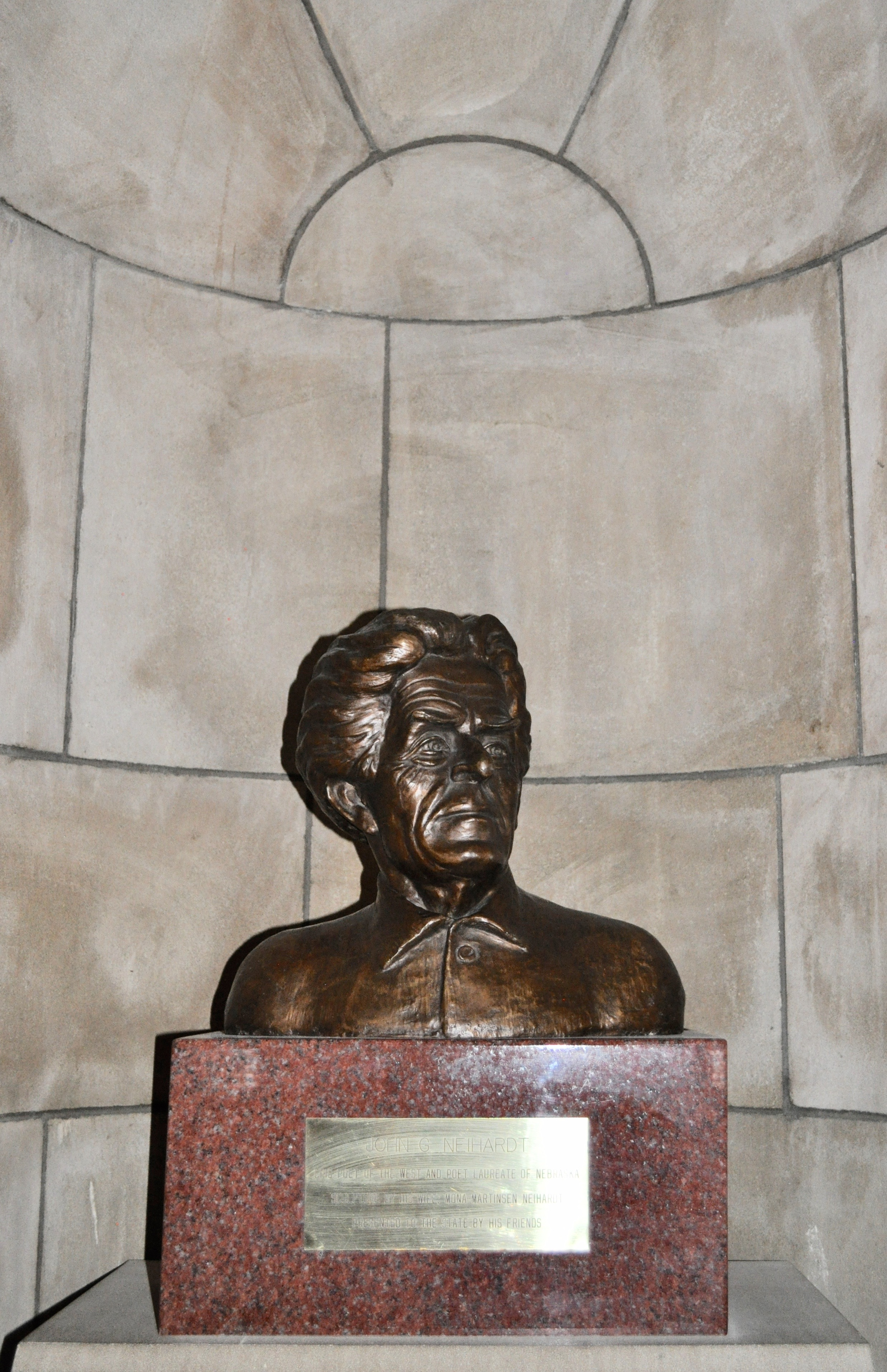
Bust of John Neihardt created in 1956 by Mona Neihardt for the Nebraska Hall of Fame.

- In 1974, Neihardt was inducted into the Nebraska Hall of Fame.
- A Residence Hall at Wayne State College in Wayne, NE is named after Neihardt. It is rumored to be haunted.
- An elementary school in Omaha, Nebraska is named after Neihardt.
- A park in Blair, NE is named for Black Elk and John Neihardt.

== Bibliography ==
- The Divine Enchantment, 1900. ISBN 0-87968-168-3
  - 2008 edition, SUNY Press. ISBN 978-1-4384-2548-1
- A Bundle of Myrrh, 1907. ISBN 1-58201-780-8
  - 2008 edition, SUNY Press. ISBN 978-1-4384-2542-9
- Man-Song, 1909. ISBN 1-58201-785-9
  - 2008 edition, SUNY Press. ISBN 978-1-4384-2554-2
- The River and I, 1910. ISBN 0-8032-8372-5
  - 2008 edition, SUNY Press. ISBN 978-1-4384-2560-3
- Life's Lure, 1914. ISBN 0-8032-3333-7
- The Song of Hugh Glass, (Cycle) 1915
  - 2008 edition, SUNY Press. ISBN 978-1-4384-2562-7
- The Quest, 1916.
  - 2008 edition, SUNY Press. ISBN 978-1-4384-2558-0
- The Song of Three Friends, (Cycle) 1919
  - 2008 edition, SUNY Press. ISBN 978-1-4384-2564-1
- The Splendid Wayfaring, 1920. ISBN 0-8032-5723-6
  - 2008 edition, SUNY Press. ISBN 978-1-4384-2566-5
- The Song of the Indian Wars, (Cycle) 1925
- Indian Tales and Others, 1926. ISBN 0-8032-3318-3
  - 2008 edition, SUNY Press. ISBN 978-1-4384-2550-4
- Black Elk Speaks, 1932, William Morrow & Company
  - 1961 new preface by author, University of Nebraska Press
  - 1979 introduction by Vine Deloria, Jr.
  - 1988 edition: ISBN 0-8032-8359-8
  - 2000 edition with index: ISBN 0-8032-6170-5
  - The Premier Edition, 2008, SUNY Press: ISBN 978-1-4384-2540-5
  - "The Complete Edition," 2014, University of Nebraska Press: 424 pp. ISBN 978-0-8032-8391-6
- The Song of the Messiah, (Cycle) 1935
- The Song of Jed Smith, (Cycle) 1941
- A Cycle of the West, 1949. ISBN 0-8032-3323-X
- When the Tree Flowered, 1952. ISBN 0-8032-8363-6
- All is But a Beginning, 1972. ISBN 0-15-104604-2
- Patterns and Coincidences, 1978 (posthumous). ISBN 0-8262-0233-0
- John G Neihardt Black Elk Speaks Stereo LP Box Set, 1973 (posthumous recording).UA-LA157-j3-1198

== See also ==
- American writers
- American philosophy
- List of American philosophers
- Lilith: A Dramatic Poem, George Sterling's 1919 play, which Neihardt influenced.
