= David Stuart (fur trader) =

David Stuart (c. 1765–1853) was a fur trader who worked primarily for the North West and Pacific Fur companies throughout his varied career.

== Fort Astoria ==
In the official Fort Astoria logbook maintained by station manager Duncan McDougall, Stuart was recorded in May 1811 as suffering overexertion and potentially a hernia from clearing timber. In the same month, the Chinookans reported sighting a merchant vessel near their settlements on the coast. Rather than lose the beaver skins to rival Maritime fur traders, McDougall sent Stuart on 22 May to Comcomly's village across the Columbia River. The reported vessel never actually appeared after its existence was announced by Chinookan traders. This episode has been suggested by historian Robert F. Jones to have been a Chinookan "stratagem" to "secure better prices, perhaps for inferior skins." Stuart returned the following day with only 20 beaver pelts.

Throughout June, Stuart and Gabriel Franchère cleared, planted and maintained a garden to grow an amount of fresh produce. In the same month, David was also appointed to oversee two canoes of men to go gather large stockpiles of tree bark. This material was utilised by the fur traders to create roofing and siding for their dwellings and related buildings. He departed with four French-Canadians and four Hawaiian Kanakas near the end of June from Astoria to Cape Disappointment. The party was taken there by Coalpo on a canoe the Clatsop noble owned. While there he reviewed the general terrain and fur bearing animal populations.

== Fort Okanogan ==
In July 1811, Stuart was given orders to open a second trade post for the PFC. The intelligence for a suitable location came from Kaúxuma Núpika, a Two-Spirit from the Ktunaxa people. Kaúxuma recommended that the station be opened near the confluence of the Columbia and "the Okannaakken River." The personnel assigned to join Stuart were eight men, including Alexander Ross, François Benjamin Pillet, Ovide de Montigny, and Naukane. The party left on the 21st, following the course of the Columbia River in the company of David Thompson and his party of NWC men. Thompson had previously came down the Columbia to Fort Astoria on 15 July from New Caledonia.

A French-Canadian assigned to the interior journey under Stuart back arrived at Fort Astoria in early October. He brought back news of the successful opening of Fort Okanogan and that the Syilx peoples were reportedly favorable to developing commercial ties with the PFC. However, in tours of the hinterlands trade goods of the NWC were found among the local inhabitants near Fort Okanogan's eventual location.

On 18 January 1812, Stuart arrived at Fort Astoria with Étienne Lucier, Robert McClellan, John Reed and seven other men. McClellan, Reed and Lucier were members of the overland expedition that had traveled overland from Fort Mackinac (in the modern state of Michigan) under W. Price Hunt's authority. The assembled men told McDougall of the remaining members of the expedition and their privations crossing the continent. Stuart's party had to leave Hunt and the majority of the PFC laborers in the Snake River basin to procure supplies and aid at Astoria. In the meantime Alexander Ross was left alone at Fort Okanogan, wintering among the Syilx. The addition of fifty or more men was feared by McDougall to potentially wreck the already uncertain Astorian food stockpiles. Hunt, about thirty men, Marie Aioe Dorion and her two children reached Fort Astoria on 15 February 1812.

== Bibliography ==
- McDougall, Duncan (1999), Jones, Robert F. (ed.), Annals of Astoria: The Headquarters Log of the Pacific Fur Company on the Columbia River, 1811-1813, New York City: Fordham University Press
- Ross, Alexander (1849), Adventures of the first settlers on the Oregon or Columbia River, London: Smith, Elder & Co., ISBN 9780598286024
- Watson, Bruce M. (2010), Lives Lived West of the Divide: A Biographical Dictionary of Fur Traders Working West of the Rockies, 1793-1858, Okanagan: The Centre for Social, Spatial and Economic Justice of the University of British Columbia
