= Coalpo =

Clatsop Chinookan leader

Coalpo was a Clatsop Chinookan leader alive in the late 18th and early 19th centuries. He married a daughter of Comcomly, the most prominent Chinookan headman on the lower Columbia River.

== Fort Astoria ==
In March 1811, the Pacific Fur Company (PFC) vessel the Tonquin entered the Columbia River and established Fort Astoria. Founded by German-American merchant John Jacob Astor, the PFC was intended to create a string of fur trading stations along the Columbia and the interior eastwards towards the Rocky Mountains. Fort Astoria for much of its operations under the PFC was reliant upon various Chinookan headmen for substance. Diplomatic relationships with the Chinookan villages near the Columbia were critical for the viability of Fort Astoria. Scholars have affirmed that the American company and its "economic success depended on mutually beneficial economic exchanges with Indian groups... who controlled trade." Many of the settlements near the station were under the influence of headman Comcomly.

=== Assistance to fur traders ===
Coalpo was an important mediator between the newly arrived fur traders and various Indigenous cultures near the Columbia River, serving in additional capacities as a guide and interpreter. Reports were circulated in April 1811 by Chinookans to Fort Astoria of a trade post maintained by white men in the interior. This was correctly conjectured by PFC employees to be their NWC rivals, later found to be Spokane House.

Departing on 2 May, Alexander MacKay led Robert Stuart, Gabriel Franchère, Ovide de Montigny and a number of voyageurs up the Columbia River to investigate these claims. The party passed Tongue Point and passed the night at Coalpo's village, "Wahkaykum." On 4 May, de Montigny and Mackay explored the Cowlitz River with Coalpo. While on the river, they encountered a large canoe force of Cowlitz warriors. McKay was able to negotiate with the armed force and create amicable relations. Members of the Cowlitz leadership explained they were in the middle of strife with a Chinookan Skilloot village nearby.

Continuing up the Columbia, the party met the prominent Multnomah Chinookan noble Kiesno. The Multonomah headman had married another daughter of Comcomly, making him a relative of Coalpo. Afterwards they passed the mouth of the Willamette River, an area described by the Clatsop as full of game and hide bearing animals. On 10 May, the party reached the rapids controlled by various Wasco and Wishram villages which included Celilo Falls. Coalpo would not go further than the borderlands of these people, informing McKay that the Wishram and Wascoes if allowed to would kill him. This was due to a prior military campaign he commanded that destroyed a major settlement in the area. In particular Alexander Henry the younger later called Coalpo an "inveterate enemy of the natives of the rapids". Content to see that the rumored NWC station wasn't at the important fishery, McKay led the party back to Fort Astoria and arrived on 14 May.

Near the end of June, Coalpo took David Stuart, four French-Canadians and four Hawaiian Kanakas from Astoria to Cape Disappointment. They sailed on the Columbia on a large canoe owned by Coalpo. While at Cape Disappointment, Stuart reviewed the general terrain and fur bearing animal populations.

== Bibliography ==
- Boyd, Robert T.; Ames, Kenneth A.; Johnson, Tony A. (2015), Chinookan Peoples of the Lower Columbia, Seattle: University of Washington Press, ISBN 9780295995236
- Henry, Alexander; Thompson, David (1897), Coues, Elliott (ed.), New Light on the Early History of the Greater Northwest, Francis P. Harper
- Franchère, Gabriel (1854), Narrative of a voyage to the Northwest coast of America, in the years 1811, 1812, 1813, and 1814, or, The first American settlement on the Pacific, translated by J. V. Huntington, New York City: Redfield
- McDougall, Duncan (1999), Jones, Robert F. (ed.), Annals of Astoria: The Headquarters Log of the Pacific Fur Company on the Columbia River, 1811-1813, New York City: Fordham University Press
