= Ovide de Montigny =

French-Canadian fur trapper

Ovide de Montigny was a French-Canadian fur trapper active in the Pacific Northwest from 1811 to 1822.

== Pacific Fur Company ==
de Montigny was hired by Alexander MacKay at Montreal in July 1810. McKay and Wilson Price Hunt were in the city recruiting men experienced in the fur trade for the Pacific Fur Company (PFC). This recently established fur trading venture was funded largely by German-American merchant John Jacob Astor. The PFC had a notably diverse workforce. The majority were British subjects of several different cultural backgrounds. The other company partners were either Scottish or American. French-Canadians typically served as voyageurs and trappers, with a number of Iroquois working in these vital roles as well. The remaining employees were Americans, Anglo-Canadian, British, or Hawaiian Kanaka.

de Montigny accompanied the other hired employees and McKay in August and traveled to New York City. Once there, the men waited to sail on aboard the Tonquin, which departed in September. After the ship sailed past Cape Horn, it landed at the Kingdom of Hawaii and hired 24 Hawaiian Kanakas. The ship reached the Columbia River in March 1811.

=== Fort Astoria ===
In the middle of April, de Montigny and his fellow PFC employees began work on what would become Fort Astoria. Reports from near by Chinookan peoples made the management aware of fellow fur traders were operating a trading post in the Pacific Northwest interior. This would later turn out to be the North West Company and its stations in New Caledonia. On 2 May 1811, McKay led a small party that included Robert Stuart, Gabriel Franchère and de Montigny up the Columbia River to investigate these claims. They were accompanied by a Clatsop noble, Coalpo, who already had developed ties with Fort Astoria and would guide the party. The party passed Tongue Point and passed the night at Coalpo's village, "Wahkaykum." On 4 May, de Montigny and Mackay explored the Cowlitz River with Coalpo. While on the river, they encountered a large canoe force of Cowlitz warriors. McKay was able to negotiate with the armed force and create amicable relations. Members of the Cowlitz leadership explained they were in the middle of strife with a Chinookan Skilloot village nearby.

Continuing up the Columbia, the party met the prominent Multnomah Chinookan noble Kiesno. The Multonomah headman had married a daughter of Chinookan noble Comcomly, making him a relative of Coalpo. Afterwards they passed the mouth of the Willamette River, an area described by the Clatsop as full of game and hide bearing animals. On 10 May, the party reached the rapids controlled by various Wasco and Wishram villages which included Celilo Falls. Coalpo would not go further than the borderlands of these people, informing McKay that the Wishram and Wascoes if allowed to would kill him. This was due to a prior military campaign he commanded that destroyed a major settlement in the area. Content to see that the rumored NWC station wasn't at the important fishery, McKay led the party back to Fort Astoria and arrived on 14 May.

Late in June 1811, he and three men were sent to Youngs Bay to collect tree bark in large quantities. The material was used for siding and roofing for the structures of Fort Astoria. de Montigney and the men returned several days later, having not found a satisfactory source of bark.

=== The Tonquin ===
Shortly before the Tonquin departed to trade with various Indigenous nations on Vancouver Island in June 1811, McKay selected Montingny to accompany him. Montingny however declined, citing an issue with sea sickness. After Jonathan Thorn insulted an elder Tla-o-qui-aht man by slapping him in the face with a beaver pelt, the Tonquin was destroyed. The only known survivor of the crew was the Quinault interpreter Joseachal, who arrived back at Fort Astoria through assistance of prominent Lower Chinookan noble Comcomly.

=== Fort Okanogan ===
de Montigny was among the PFC employees dispatched into the interior to establish Fort Okanogan. It was here he remained until the North West Company absorbed the Pacific Fur Company. de Montigny worked in various capacities for the NWC in the region until it was in turn merged into the Hudson's Bay Company.

== Bibliography ==
- Franchère, Gabriel (1854), Narrative of a voyage to the Northwest coast of America, in the years 1811, 1812, 1813, and 1814, or, The first American settlement on the Pacific, translated by J. V. Huntington, New York City: Redfield
- Jones, Robert F. (1997), "The Identity of the Tonquin's Interpreter", Oregon Historical Quarterly, 98 (3), Oregon Historical Society: 296–314
- McDougall, Duncan (1999), Robert F. Jones (ed.), Annals of Astoria: The Headquarters Log of the Pacific Fur Company on the Columbia River, 1811-1813, New York City: Fordham University Press
- Watson, Bruce M. (2010), Lives Lived West of the Divide: A Biographical Dictionary of Fur Traders Working West of the Rockies, 1793-1858, Okanagan: The Centre for Social, Spatial and Economic Justice of the University of British Columbia
