= Alexander MacKay (fur trader) =

Canadian fur trader and explorer

- Born: c. 1770; Probably Mohawk Valley area of central New York
- Died: June 15, 1811 (aged 40–41); Clayoquot Sound, Vancouver Island
- Occupations: Fur trader, mountain man, frontiersman
- Known for: Co-founding Fort Astoria near the mouth of the Columbia River on the Pacific coast
- Spouse: Marguerite Waddens
- Parent(s): Donald MacKay, Elspeth Kennedy

Alexander MacKay (c. 1770 – 15 June 1811) (also spelled McKay in some records) was a Canadian fur trader and explorer who worked for the North West Company and the Pacific Fur Company. He co-founded Fort Astoria near the mouth of the Columbia River on the Pacific coast.

== Early life ==
MacKay was probably born in the Mohawk Valley area of central New York, where his father Donald MacKay had brought the family after the Seven Years' War. Loyalists during the American Revolutionary War, the family departed the area and first lived in the Trois Rivières area of Lower Canada. They settled in the Glengarry region of Upper Canada about 1792.

Alexander MacKay married Marguerite Waddens or Wadin and had one son, Thomas McKay, and three daughters: Annie Nancy McKay, Catherine McKay and Marie Wadin McKay. His natural son Alexander Ross MacKay was born by another woman.

== North West Company career ==
MacKay was working for the North West Company (NWC) sometime before 1791. In 1792 he was transferred to Fort Fork (Peace River, Alberta) on the request of Alexander Mackenzie. MacKay accompanied Mackenzie on his 1793 overland journey to the Pacific Ocean, the first such journey north of New Spain.

From 1793 to 1800 MacKay was probably a clerk in the NWC's Upper English River (now called Churchill River) fur district near Lac La Loche, present-day Saskatchewan. In 1800 he was made a NWC partner and worked in the English River district until 1804. In 1808 MacKay resigned from the NWC and returned to the East to retire wealthy at age 38 in Montreal. This was an indication of the scale of income which partners received in the fur trade.

== Pacific Fur Company career ==
In 1810 Mackay, along with several other retired NWC personnel, such as Donald McKenzie and Duncan McDougall, signed a preliminary agreement with the American businessman John Jacob Astor. Astor intended to establish a new fur trading company to operate in the Columbia River region. MacKay, McKenzie, and McDougall recruited additional workers in Montreal for Astor's company, the Pacific Fur Company.

MacKay enlisted a number of people, including Gabriel Franchère, David Stuart, Robert Stuart, and MacKay's own son Thomas, who was 13 at the time. All of these people joined MacKay in his 1811 sea voyage to the mouth of the Columbia River on the Tonquin. During the voyage, enmity developed between MacKay and Jonathan Thorn, captain of the Tonquin. Thorn tried to maroon MacKay and others at the Falkland Islands.

Along with Alexander Ross, MacKay was instrumental in founding Fort Astoria in early 1811. MacKay led a trading and exploring party up the Columbia River in May 1811. Then in June 1811 he sailed as supercargo on the Tonquin, and led an expedition that attempted to acquire furs from natives along the coast to the north. In a conflict in 1811 with the indigenous people of Clayoquot Sound, the Tonquin was attacked and blown up. Nearly everyone on board, including Alexander MacKay, was killed.

As MacKay's son Thomas had stayed at Fort Astoria, he survived. MacKay's wife Marguerite Waddens MacKay had not journeyed to the west with the expedition. As a widow, she later married John McLoughlin and came to the Columbia River region. McLoughlin cared for Thomas MacKay as his stepson.
