= Albatros (19th-century ship) =

History
- Name: Albatros

Albatros was an American-owned ship which brought to W. Price Hunt, partner of the Pacific Fur Company, at its Astoria post, news of the War of 1812.

Hunt had left Astoria on August 4, 1812, on a trading mission to Russia, where his ship Beaver was damaged by a storm in the Bering Sea. Beaver's captain felt it was too dangerous to enter the Columbia River and return to Astoria, so the ship sailed for the Sandwich Islands for repairs. Hunt was to stay there until the annual Astoria resupply ship stopped there, on which he could return to Astoria. Hunt was stranded there from the end of 1812 awaiting the supply ship which, he later learned, had wrecked near the islands.

On June 20, 1813, Albatros arrived from China and Hunt first learned of the war with the British. Hunt surmised that the annual resupply ship had not been sent due to the war. At a cost of $2,000, he chartered Albatross to bring supplies to Astoria and returned there after a years absence on August 20, 1813, with a cargo of food and other supplies.

Upon his return, he learned that in his absence it has been decided to abandon the venture due to lack of supplies, the threat of the war, and competition from the North West Company. On August 26, 1813, Hunt left Astoria on Albatros sailing for the Marquesas Islands and then the Sandwich Islands. Having decided to abandon Astoria, Hunt left to obtain a ship to remove the company's property and employees.
