= François Benjamin Pillet =

French-Canadian fur trapper

François Benjamin Pillet was a French-Canadian fur trapper active in the Pacific Northwest in the early 19th century, primarily employed by the Pacific Fur Company (PFC).

== Pacific Fur Company ==
Prior to his time with the PFC, Pillet gained fluency in the Cree language, implying previous experience in the fur trade. He was hired in July 1810 by Alexander MacKay to join the PFC. In August 1810, Pillet joined the group of trappers organized by McKay that was bound from Montreal to New York City. Once there, the men awaited to sail on aboard the Tonquin, which departed later in September. After sailing around Cape Horn and visiting the Kingdom of Hawaii, the ship reached the Columbia River in March 1811.

=== Fort Astoria ===
Pillet worked with other PFC laborers to begin work on Fort Astoria, in the middle of April.

The Tonquin departed to trade with various Indigenous nations on Vancouver Island in June 1811. After the ship's commander Jonathan Thorn insulted an elder Tla-o-qui-aht man by slapping him in the face with a beaver pelt, the Tonquin was destroyed. The only known survivor of the crew was the Quinault interpreter Joseachal, who arrived back at Fort Astoria through assistance of prominent Lower Chinookan noble Comcomly.

== Bibliography ==
- Franchère, Gabriel (1854), Narrative of a voyage to the Northwest coast of America, in the years 1811, 1812, 1813, and 1814, or, The first American settlement on the Pacific, translated by J. V. Huntington, New York City: Redfield
- Jones, Robert F. (1997), "The Identity of the Tonquin's Interpreter", Oregon Historical Quarterly, 98 (3), Oregon Historical Society: 296–314
- Watson, Bruce M. (2010), Lives Lived West of the Divide: A Biographical Dictionary of Fur Traders Working West of the Rockies, 1793-1858, Okanagan: The Centre for Social, Spatial and Economic Justice of the University of British Columbia
