= Beaver (1805 ship) =

1806 American merchant ship

History

United States
- Name: Beaver
- Owner: John Jacob Astor
- Operator: Cornelius Sowle
- Builder: Eckford & Beebe
- Laid down: 1803
- Launched: 1805
- Acquired: 1806
- Fate: Broken up around 1850

General characteristics
- Class & type: bark
- Tonnage: 427 tons
- Length: 107 ft (33 m)
- Propulsion: Sail, 3 masted

Beaver was a 427-ton merchant ship owned by John Jacob Astor that was in service from 1806 to the middle of the century.

== Qing Empire ==
The Beaver was designed for John Jacob Astor by Eckford & Beebe, with construction completed in 1805. The ship sailed to the Qing Empire in 1806 and was captained by Isaac Chauncey. Upon entering the Bocca Tigris the Beaver was detained by HMS Phaeton. One of the sailors was forcibly impressed onto the Phaeton as he was recognised as a British citizen. After this incident the Beaver entered the port of Guangzhou and "a full load of Teas, Nankeens & China" was purchased. Shortly after leaving the Bocca Tigris another Royal Navy ship, HMS Lion, ordered the ship to stop. Tensions arose when Chauncey refused to allow any further impressment of his crew. However that evening the Beaver was allowed to depart back to New York City. The voyage was a success and brought Astor a sizable profit.

== Pacific Northwest ==
Eventually, the Beaver was planned as an additional supply ship for Astor's developing Pacific Fur Company (PFC). Along with the Tonquin, the Beaver was a critical part of Astor's plans in expanding operations in the Maritime Fur Trade. The ship sailed from New York City to the Pacific Northwest on 10 October 1811 with Cornelius Sowle as its captain.

The additional company employees brought included Ross Cox and Alfred Seton. Fort Astoria was reached on 9 May 1812 after crossing the Columbia Bar. At Astoria news about the destruction of the Tonquin by members of the Tla-o-qui-aht nation was confirmed.

After unloading necessary supplies to the Fort, directives from Astor dictated that the Beaver was to then go north to Russian America to purchase additional furs. The manager of PFC operations, W. Price Hunt, joined Sowle and the crew during this voyage and acted the negotiator with Russian governor Alexander Andreyevich Baranov. The Beaver arrived at New Archangel on 19 August. The cargo was purchased by the Russians amounted to ₽124,000 in value, with payment in seal skins. The purchased furs were located at the Russian-American Company station on Saint Paul Island though bad weather prevented them being loaded until November.

Additional orders from Astor called for the Beaver to return to the Columbia River after completing trade with the Russians. Despite this, Sowle and Hunt found the ship in poor repair and sailed for the Kingdom of Hawaii instead. Hunt was left there as the Beaver went west to the Qing. While at Guangzhou, Sowle learned of the eruption of the War of 1812 and remained at the port for the remainder of the conflict. The Beaver then proceeded to New York City and entered the city harbor on 22 March 1816.

== Bibliography ==
=== Articles ===
- Howay, F. W. (1933). "Captain Cornelius Sowle on the Pacific". Washington Historical Quarterly. 24 (4). Seattle, WA: University of Washington Press: 243–249 – via University of Washington.

=== Books ===
- Greenhow, Robert (1844). The History of Oregon and California & the Other Territories of the Northwest Coast of North America. Boston, MA: Charles C. Little and James Brown – via Google Books.
- Pierce, Richard A. (1990). Russian America: A Biographical Dictionary. Kingston, ON: Limestone Press. ISBN 9780919642454.
- Ross, Alexander (1849). Adventures of the First Settlers on the Oregon Or Columbia River. London: Smith, Elder and Co. ISBN 978-0-598-28602-4.
- Tikhmenev, Petr A. (1978). A History of the Russian-American Company. Translated by Pierce, Richard A.; Donnelly, Alton S. Seattle: University of Washington Press. ISBN 978-0295955643.

=== Websites ===
- Chauncey, Issac (1806-12-30). "To James Madison from Com. Isaac Chauncey, 30 December 1806". Founders Online. National Archives and Records Administration. Archived from the original on 2016-02-06.
- Chauncey, Issac (1807-06-09). "To James Madison from Com. Isaac Chauncey, 9 June 1807". Founders Online. National Archives and Records Administration. Archived from the original on 2016-02-06.
