= Pacific Fur Company =

American fur-trading company (1810–13)

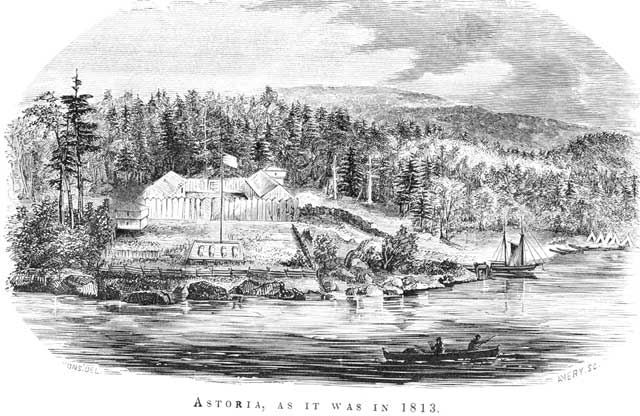
- Fort Astoria, the Pacific Fur Company’s trading post, depicted in 1813 by company clerk Gabriel Franchère
- Type: Private
- Industry: Fur trade
- Founded: New York City, U.S., (1810)
- Founder: John Jacob Astor
- Defunct: 1813
- Fate: Sold at a loss
- Successor: North West Company
- Headquarters: Fort Astoria, present day Astoria, Oregon, U.S.
- Area served: Pacific Northwest, also referred to as Oregon Country or the Columbia District
- Key people: Wilson Price Hunt, Duncan McDougall, Alexander McKay, David Stuart
- Total assets: $200,000 (1810)
- Parent: American Fur Company

The Pacific Fur Company (PFC) was an American fur-trading enterprise founded and financed by John Jacob Astor in 1810. Astor planned a network of trading posts to connect North American fur-producing regions with markets in China. The company established its principal trading post at Fort Astoria in 1811 near the mouth of the Columbia River, in what is now Astoria, Oregon.

The company sent expeditions by sea and overland to the Pacific Northwest. It traded with Indigenous peoples, including the Chinook, and established inland posts in competition with the Montreal-based North West Company. In 1812, Astor secured the right to ship furs from Sitka in Russian America to China and sell them there. The loss of the company ship Tonquin and delays in the overland expedition hampered operations.

During the War of 1812, the threat of British seizure led the partners at Fort Astoria to sell the company’s regional holdings to the North West Company in October 1813. The partners decided to dissolve the company in June 1814. On an eastbound journey in 1812, a company party led by Robert Stuart traveled through the South Pass area of the Rocky Mountains. The pass, long used by Indigenous peoples, later became a major crossing on the Oregon Trail.

== Formation ==
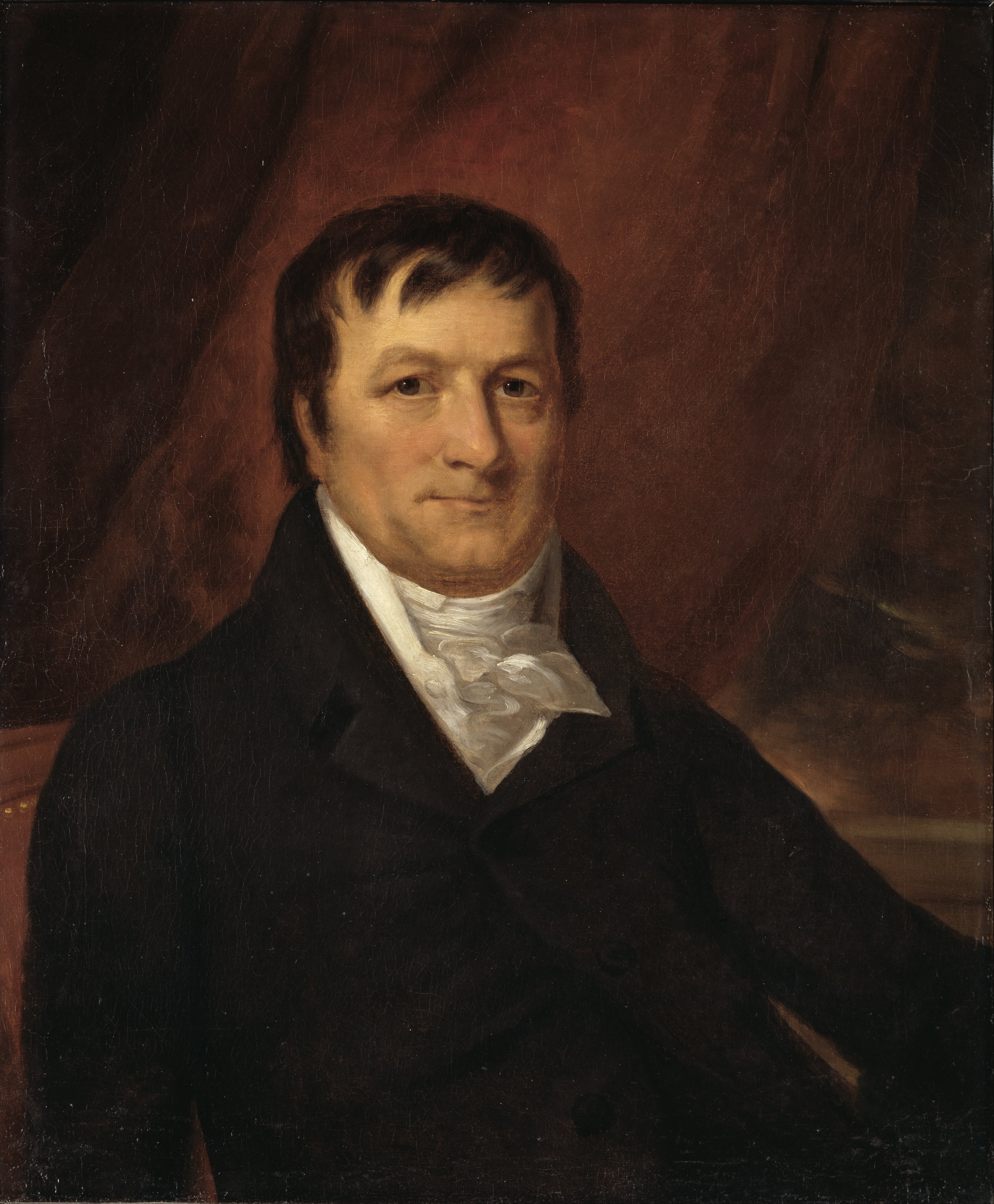
John Jacob Astor established the Pacific Fur Company as part of his grandiose plans to gain commercial hegemony over major fur producing areas in the North American fur trade against his North West and Hudson's Bay competitors.

John Jacob Astor was a merchant of New York City and founder of the American Fur Company. To create a chain of trading stations spread across the Rocky Mountains to the Pacific Northwest, he incorporated an AFC subsidiary, the Pacific Fur Company. The commercial venture was originally designed to last for twenty years. Unlike its major competitor the Canadian owned NWC, the Pacific Fur Company was not a Joint-stock company. Capital for the PFC amounted to $200,000 divided into 100 shares individually valued at $2,000 and was funded entirely by Astor. The American Fur Company held half of the stock and the other half divided among prospective management and clerks. The chief representative of Astor in the daily operations was Wilson Price Hunt, a St. Louis businessman with no outback experience who received five shares. Each working partner was assigned four shares with the remaining shares held in reserve for hired clerks. Fellow partners in the venture were recruited from the NWC, the members being Alexander McKay, David Stuart, Duncan McDougall, and Donald Mackenzie. Astor and the partners met in New York on 23 June 1810 to sign the Pacific Fur Company's provisional agreement.

To establish the fledgling PFC trade posts in the distant Oregon Country, Astor's plan called for an extensive movement of large groups of employees overland following the route of the Lewis and Clark Expedition and navally by sailing around Cape Horn. The venture was planned on methods used in the AFC for the collection of fur pelts. Complements of employees (later called "Astorians") would operate in various parts of the region to complete trapping excursions. Outposts maintained by the PFC would be freighted necessary foodstuffs and supplies by annual cargo ships from New York City. Trade goods such as beads, blankets, and copper would be exchanged with the local Native Americans for fur pelts.

Ongoing supply issues faced by the Russian-American Company were seen as a means to gain more furs. Cargo ships en route from the Columbia were planned to then sail north for Russian America to bring much needed provisions. By cooperating with Russian colonial authorities to strengthen their material presence in Russian America, it was hoped by Astor to stop the NWC or any other British presence to be established upon the Pacific Coast. A tentative agreement for merchant vessels owned by Astor to ship furs gathered in Russian America into the Qing Empire was signed in 1812. Company ships then were directed to sail to the port of Guangzhou, where furs were then sold for impressive profits. Chinese products like porcelain, nankeens and tea were to be purchased; with the ships then to cross the Indian Ocean and head for European and American markets to sell the Chinese wares.

== Labor recruitment ==
The PFC required a sizable number of laborers, fur trappers and in particular Voyageurs to staff company locations. Recruiting for the company's two expeditions were led by Wilson Hunt and Donald Mackenzie for the overland party and Alexander McKay for the naval bound group. All three men were based out of Montreal throughout May to July 1810. Hunt was designated to lead the Overland Expedition, despite his inexperience in dealing with Indigenous cultures, or residing in the wilderness. It was suggested that Hunt instead trade positions with McKay and travel on the Tonquin. However, it was determined to keep Hunt in charge of the land party.

The customary time for free agents to be sent into the interior from Montreal was in May, leaving few men left in the city available for hire. The recruitment effort stalled in part from the bitter treatment by the NWC and Hunt's lack of prior experience as a fur merchant, the source of many issues later on. PFC contracts were atypically favorable for hired men when compared to its Montreal competitors. Terms included a forty percent larger annual salary, double the cash advanced prior to departure and a length of service lasting five years, rather than the more common two or three year employment.

=== McKay's efforts ===
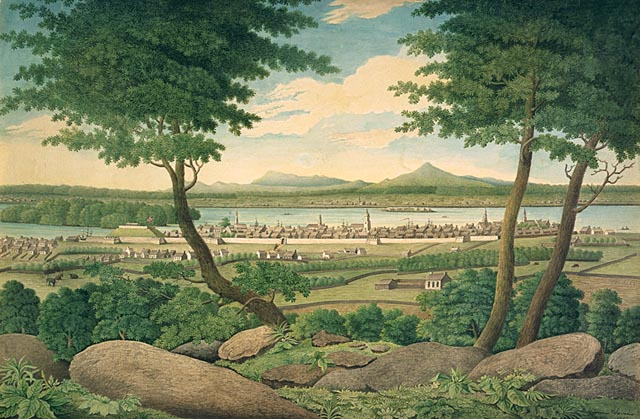
Montreal was the first location men were hired by the PFC, made difficult in part from opposition from the rival North West Company.

During the summer of 1810, Alexander McKay hired thirteen French-Canadians for the Tonquin. The majority of the group remained in Montreal until late July, when they given directives to withdraw to New York City. A canoe provided transportation for the trip up the Richelieu River and Lake Champlain. At Whitehall additional men that were employed by McKay joined the southbound party, among them Ovide de Montigny. On 3 August they reached New York City, with the group's "hats decorated with parti-colored ribands and feathers..." causing some Americans to believe them to Natives. The following day lodgings at Long Island were reached and the scene was described by clerk Gabriel Franchère:

"We sang as we rowed; which, joined to the unusual sight of a birch bark canoe impelled by nine stout Canadians, dark as Indians, and as gayly adorned, attracted a crowd upon the wharves to gaze at us as we glided along."

While waiting to depart for the Pacific, McKay met with British diplomatic official Francis James Jackson. The official assured McKay that in the event of war between the United States and United Kingdom, all PFC employees that were British employees would be treated as such.

=== Hunt's efforts ===
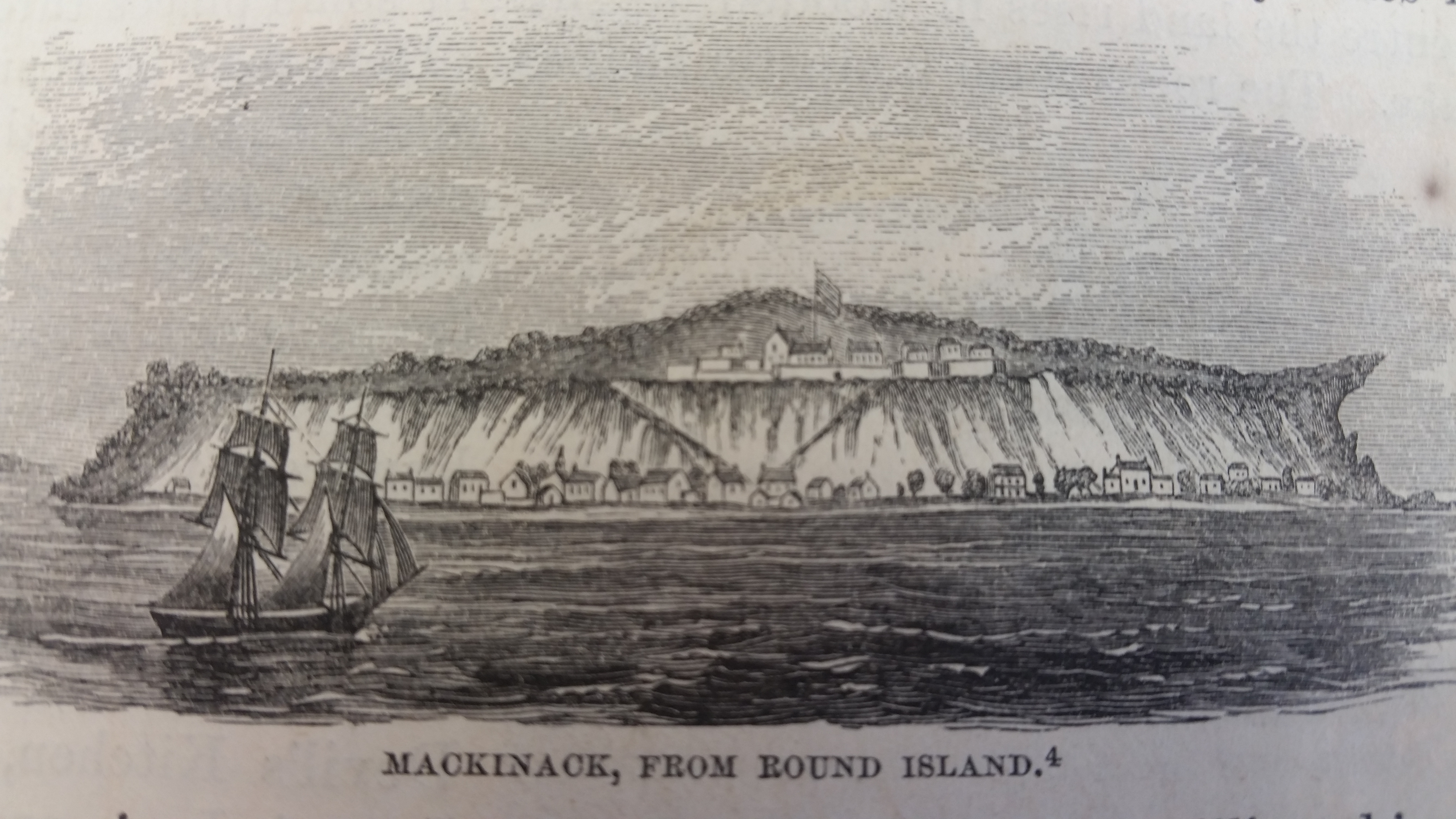
Fort Mackinac was a center of the Great Lakes regional fur trade

Thirteen men signed contracts in Montreal to join Hunt on the journey to the Pacific coast by land. Notably only one had previously operated under a contract lasting longer than a year. The generous cash advancements were taken advantage by three men who deserted before Hunt and the remaining group left the city for Michilimackinac in July. The party reached Mackinac Island on 28 July 1810. Acting as a major depot for the regional Great Lakes fur trade, the island was where Hunt focused on hiring more men for the company. The veteran fur merchant Ramsay Crooks was convinced to join the company and assisted in recruiting additional men. Over the sixteen days spent there, a total seventeen men were recruited to the concern with sixteen being French-Canadian. This group of men, unlike those hired in Montreal, had extensive experience working in the fur trade as voyageurs and other roles. Likely suggested by Crooks, interested men already hired by other companies would have their contracts purchased from their employers.

After the men were finally gathered in early August, Hunt and the party departed for St. Louis and arrived there on 3 September. The hired voyageurs and fur trappers completed many transactions with various merchants in St. Louis and in the nearby French-Canadian settlement of Ste. Genevieve throughout September and October. These were recorded on the company ledger and particular purchases been argued as the men collecting goods to trade with various Indigenous nations they would visit. In particular, these negotiations by the French-Canadians have been thought to be steps towards later establishing themselves as independent traders in relatively unexploited fur regions. Most of the men in the Overland Party were engaged as hunters, interpreters, guides and voyageurs.

== Oceanic component ==
The advanced party was sent to create the initial base of operations at the mouth of the Columbia River. Necessary trade goods for deals with Indigenous and needed supplies to establish the station were shipped on the same vessel In addition to beginning the company headquarters, this party would block any attempts by the NWC to create a station in the area. The ship Tonquin was purchased by Astor in 1810 to start commercial operations on the Pacific Ocean. The majority of the company partners. Duncan McDougall, David and Robert Stuart, and Alexander McKay would head this detachment. In addition, clerks Gabriel Franchère and Alexander Ross would join them on the planned voyage.

=== The Tonquin ===
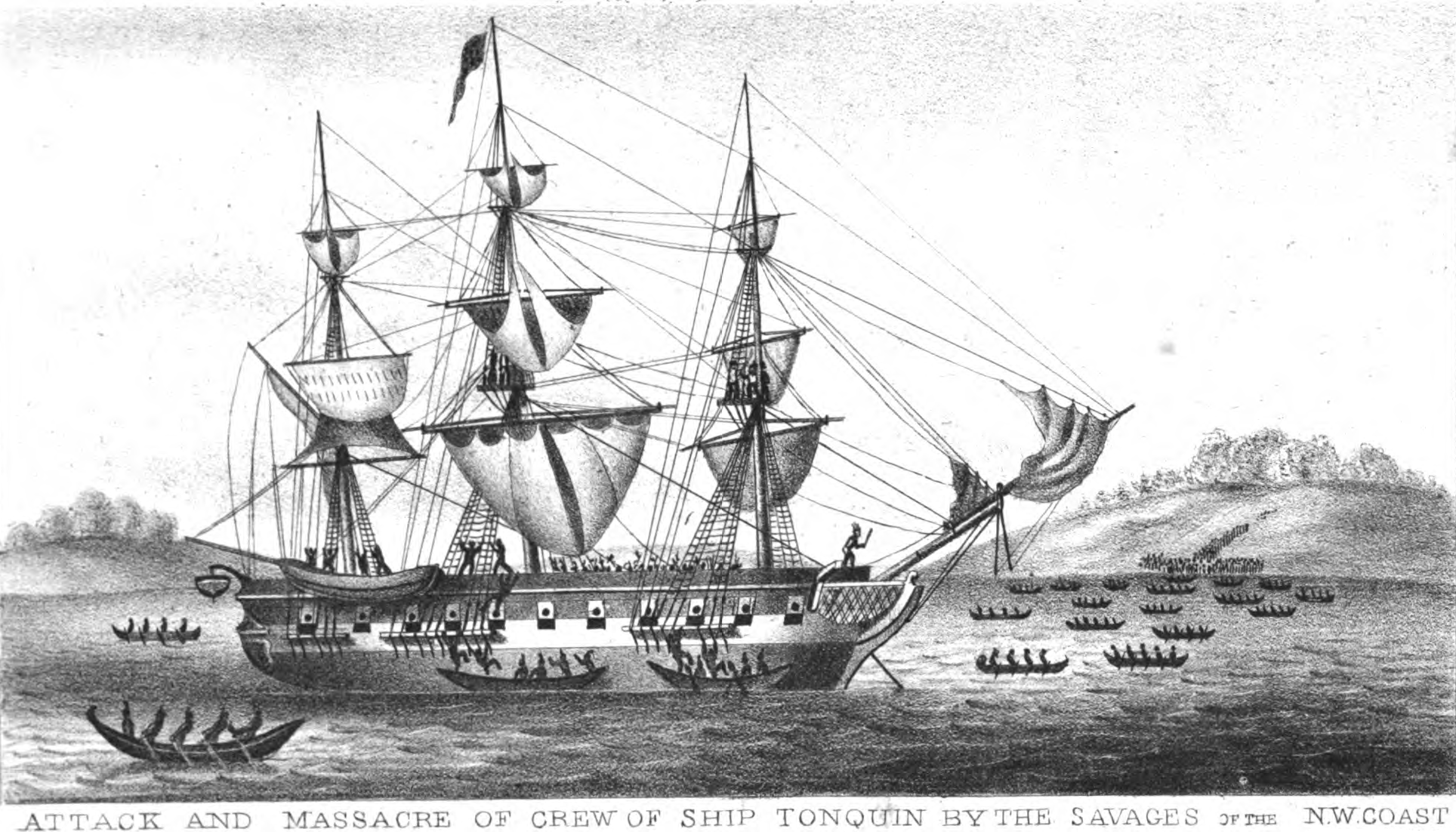
The Tonquin being boarded by Tla-o-qui-aht after Captain Thorn assaulted a local noble late in 1811. The clash would destroy the ship along with the entire crew, leaving Fort Astoria without extensive supplies until the following year.

Under the command of Jonathan Thorn the Tonquin left New York on September 8, 1810. PFC employees numbered thirty-three men in total on board. The vessel landed at the Falkland Islands on 4 December to make repairs and take on water supplies at Port Egmont. Captain Thorn attempted to abandon eight of the crew still on shore, among them clerks Gabriel Franchère and Alexander Ross. The stranded men were taken on board after Robert Stuart threatened to kill Thorn. Communication between company workers was no longer held in English to keep the captain excluded from discussions. Company partners held talks in their ancestral Scottish Gaelic and the laborers used Canadian French. On December 25 the Tonquin rounded Cape Horn and sailed north into the Pacific Ocean.

The ship anchored at the Kingdom of Hawaii in February 1811. Due to the possibility of men abandoning their posts to live in the tropical islands, Thorn assembled all of the crew and PFC employees to harass them to remain on the ship. Commercial transactions with Hawaiians saw the crew purchasing cabbage, sugar cane, purple yams, taro, coconuts, watermelon, breadfruit, hogs, goats, two sheep, and poultry in return for "glass beads, iron rings, needles, cotton cloth". Upon entering Honolulu, the crew was greeted by Isaac Davis and Francisco de Paula Marín, the latter acting an interpreter in negotiations with Kamehameha I and prominent government official Kalanimoku. 24 Native Hawaiian Kanakas were hired with the approval of Kamehameha I, who appointed Naukane to oversee their interests.

The Columbia River was reached in March 1811. Despite stormy conditions, over several days Thorn ordered two boats dispatched to scout a safe route over the treacherous Columbia Bar. Both boats would capsize and eight men lost their lives. Finally on March 24, the Tonquin crossed the bar, passing into the Columbia’s estuary and laid anchor in Baker’s Bay. Captain Thorn stressed the urgency for the Tonquin to start trading further north along the Pacific Coast as instructed by Astor. After 65 days on the Columbia River, the Tonquin departed with a crew of 23 with McKay was aboard the ship as supercargo. At Vancouver Island she was boarded by the Tla-o-qui-aht people of Clayoquot Sound, where Thorn caused an uproar by hitting a Tla-o-qui-aht noble with a pelt. In the ensuing conflict all of men brought on the Tonquin were killed besides an interpreter from the Quinault nation and the ship was destroyed. This put the occupants of Fort Astoria in a tough position, having no access to seaborne transport until the following year.

=== Fort Astoria ===
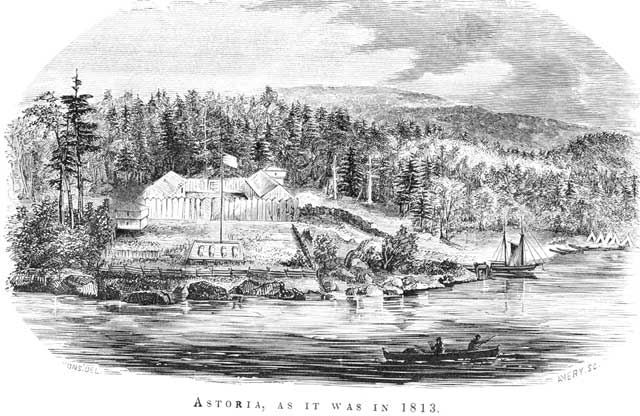
Fort Astoria two years after its foundation

Construction on Fort Astoria, an "emporium of the west", began in the middle of April 1811. It was built upon Point George, the location being about 5 miles (8 km) from the Lewis and Clark Expedition winter camp of Fort Clatsop. The terrain and thick forests made clearing a foundation exceedingly difficult. Late in the month, McDougall reported that there was "little progress in clearing, the place being so full of half decayed trunks, large fallen timber & thick brush." No one among the party had previous experience in the logging industry and many had not used an axe before in general. Trees had a layer of hardened resin and were of a massive size. Four men worked as a team on platforms at least eight feet above the ground to effectively cut a tree, with it taking typically two days for a single tree to be felled. Medical issues quickly became another major issue for the party as there was not a single medical officer among the passengers brought on the Tonquin. This left treatments rudimentary at best. During the initial months on the Columbia River at any time upwards of half of the expedition was unable to perform manual labor due to illness.

=== Fort Okanogan ===
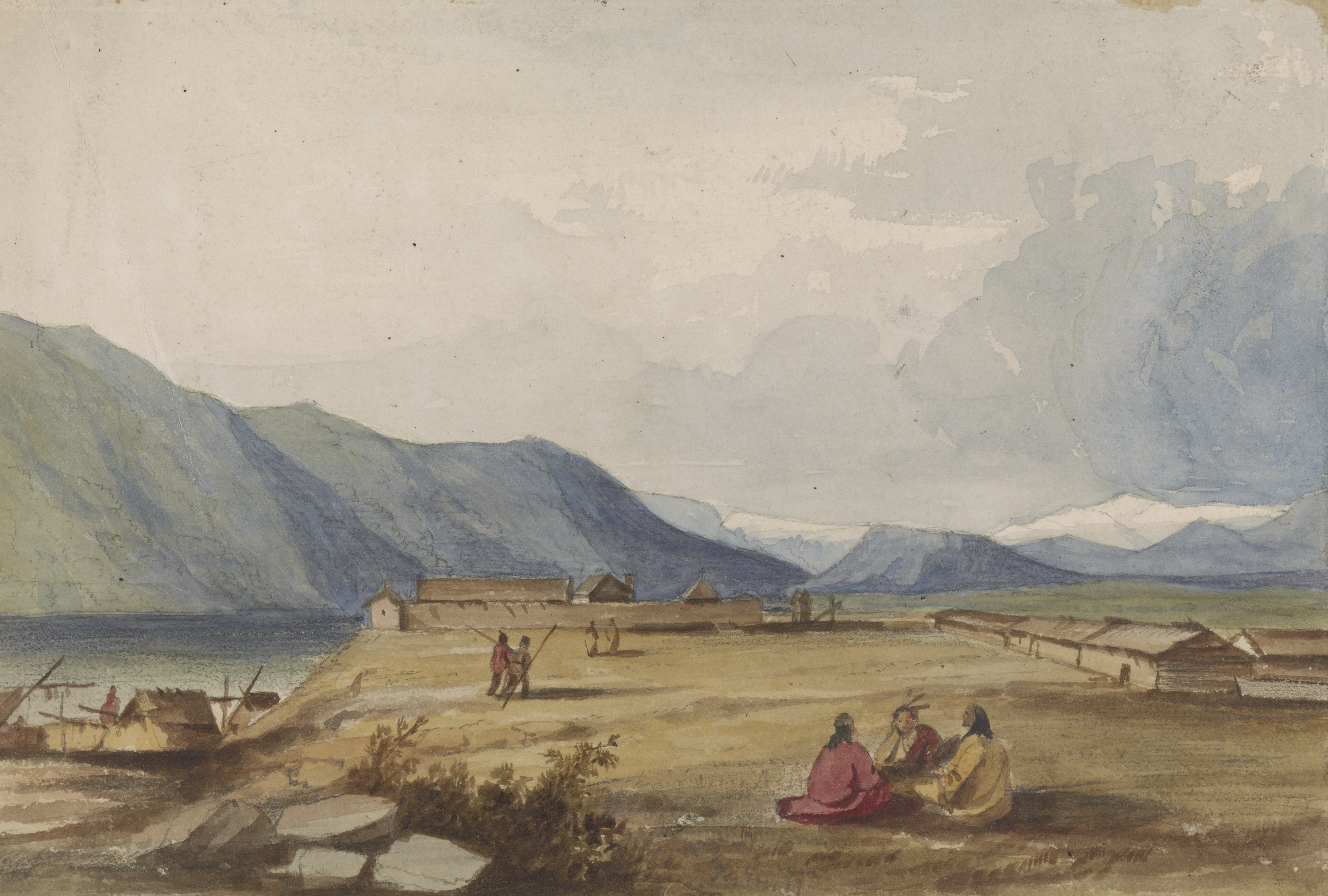
Fort Okanogan was the second station opened, intended to compete against near by NWC posts.

Kaúxuma Núpika, a Two-Spirit from the Ktunaxa people, and his wife arrived at Fort Astoria on 15 June 1811 with a letter from John Stuart. Kaúxuma offered accounts of the interior and recommended that the station be opened at the confluence of the Columbia and "the Okannaakken River" among the Syilx peoples. It was determined that David Stuart would take a party to with Kaúxuma to the Syilx. Before they left however the inhabitants of Astoria were surprised by the arrival of David Thompson on 15 July. Thompson later stated that his group "set off on a voyage down the Columbia River to explore this river in order to open out a passage for the interior trade with the Pacific Ocean." The competing fur traders were cordially received at Astoria.

A party of eight led by David Stuart departed on 22 July for the Syilx territories. The personnel assigned to join Stuart were eight men, including Alexander Ross, François Benjamin Pillet, Ovide de Montigny, and Naukane. The group joined David Thompson and his eight men in traveling up the Columbia, staying together until the Dalles. Upon entering Watlala Chinookan territory, Stuart failed establish favorable relations with them. Watlala men performed several military displays and stole a small amount of goods. Naukane agreed to join the NWC shortly after this episode and the two parties separated. Stuart was able to secure the protection of Wasco-Wishram leadership in early August. Groups of Chinookan laborers were used to cross the portages of the Columbia in their homeland.

Stuart's party soon began to travel through the Sahaptin nations and on the 12th of August an assembly of Walla Walla, Cayuse and Nez Perce welcomed the fur traders. Once the reception was complete, the PFC men continued up the Columbia and passed by the future site of Fort Nez Percés. Towards the end of August the party began to become troubled with Western Rattlesnake populations and rapids, almost losing one canoe and the men aboard it to a section of swift currents. Stuart and his men were greeted by Wenatchi leadership at the Wenatchee River, who gave two horses to the fur traders as a gift in addition to several more being purchased. While passing through other Indigenous homelands the PFC continued financial dealings for food supplies. Members of the Chelan nation traded "some salmon, roots, and berries" and later Methows offered their "abundance of salmon" and "many horses" to the fur trappers for sale.

While at the junction of the Columbia and Okanogan River, a large encampment of Syilx were encountered. Prominent members of the nation entreated the fur traders to reside among their people, proclaiming "themselves to be always be our friends, to kill us plenty of beavers, to furnish us at all times with provisions, and to ensure our protection and safety." The cargo of the canoes were taken to land on 1 September and work soon began on Fort Okanogan. A residence crafted from driftwood acquired from the Okanogan River. While construction of the post was ongoing, four men that included Pillet were detailed to inform the progress of inland trade. The party arrived back at the company headquarters on 11 October and gave its favorable report.

Stuart led Montigny and two other men to follow the course of the Okanogan, leaving only Ross at the post. As promised, the Syilx provided security for the station, frequently alerting Ross when intruders from other nations came near. Despite planning on exploring the Okanogan watershed for a month, Stuart and his three men did not return until 22 March 1812. Upon reaching the Okanogan headwaters the party then went over to the Thompson River. Snows in mountain passes made it exceedingly difficult for the party to travel. Detained among the Secwepemc, Stuart developed cordial relations with them. Finding their areas rich in beaver populations, he promised to return later that year to create a trading post.

== The Lower Chinookan peoples ==
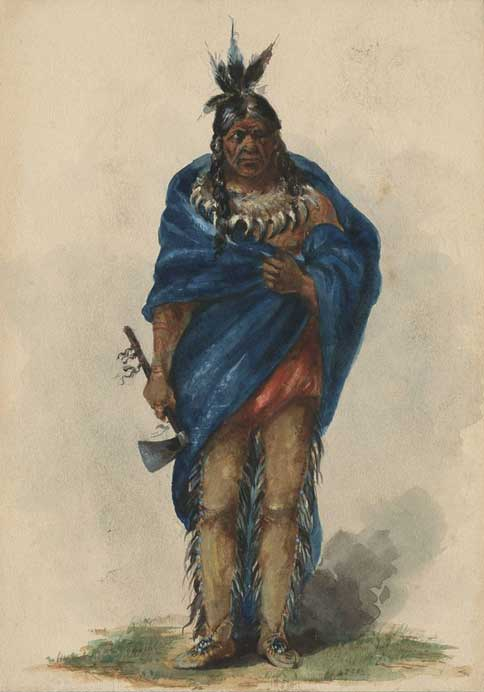
Comcomly's mercantile skills as an intermediary gained him significant profits in deals with Fort Astoria. In particular he controlled the sale of many of the pelts originating from the Chinookan, Chehalis and Quinault nations.

Diplomatic relationships with the Chinookan villages near the Columbia were critical for the viability of Fort Astoria. Scholars have affirmed that the American company and its "economic success depended on mutually beneficial economic exchanges with Indian groups... who controlled trade." Many of the settlements near the station were under the influence of headman Comcomly.

=== Assistance in exploration ===
Chinookans were highly important in company explorations of the Pacific Coast. In particular, they were instrumental in finding a suitable location for what became Fort Astoria. In early April 1811 McDougall and David Stuart visited Comcomly, who advised them not to return to the Columbia River as it was then quite tumultuous. The two men did not listen and shortly afterward their canoe capsized in the river. The "timely succor" of Comcomly and his villagers ensured the partners were saved before they drowned. After recuperating there for three days, they returned to the PFC camp.

Additional services tendered was the relaying information from more distant peoples to the Astorians. Reports were circulated by them in late April 1811 of a trade post maintained by white men in the interior. This was correctly conjectured by PFC employees to be their NWC rivals, later found to be Spokane House. Departing on 2 May, McKay led Robert Stuart, Franchère, Ovide de Montigny and a number of voyageurs up the Columbia, with Clatsop noble Coalpo acting as guide and interpreter. The following day they explored the Cowlitz River and soon encountered a large canoe flotilla of Cowlitz warriors. McKay was able to request a parlay, during which the Cowlitz stated they were armed for combat against the nearby Skilloot Chinookan village near the river mouth. Reaching the Dalles on 10 May, no trade station was found at the important fishery. Due to Coalpo's fear of reprisal from his enemies among the Wasco and Wishram, the party went back to Fort Astoria, returning on 14 May.

Despite not finding the NWC post, management at Fort Astoria soon became "anxious to acquire a knowledge of the country & the prospects of trade... within our reach". On 6 June 1811, Robert Stuart went north on a tour of western Olympic Peninsula with Calpo acting as a guide again. Returning on 24 June, Stuart reported that the Quinault and nearby Quileute nations would kill Sea otters and trade their pelts for the valuable Dentalium shells sold by the Nuu-chah-nulth on Vancouver Island. Stuart felt that a company trade post in Grays Harbor offered the best location to secure these furs. Additionally he gave the opinion that Alutiiq in Russian America should be recruited to hunt various fur bearing animals at the hypothetical factory.

However, Chinookans were not always willing to help Astorians in visiting distant locations. This was a means of delaying the Astorians from making commercial connections with Indigenous peoples on the Upper Columbia. One particular incident has been described by historian Robert F. Jones as "an effort to keep Comcomly's Chinooks as middlemen between the natives of the upper Columbia and the Astorians." François Benjamin Pillet was ordered to make a trading trip along the Columbia. Accompanied by a Chinook headman, they left Fort Astoria in late June 1811. Small trade deals were completed with Skilloots near modern Oak Point. Afterwards, the headman cited the seasonal flooding as making the Columbia unsafe to travel further upriver. This forced Pillet to return to Astoria with what pelts he had purchased from the Skilloots.

=== Commercial ties ===
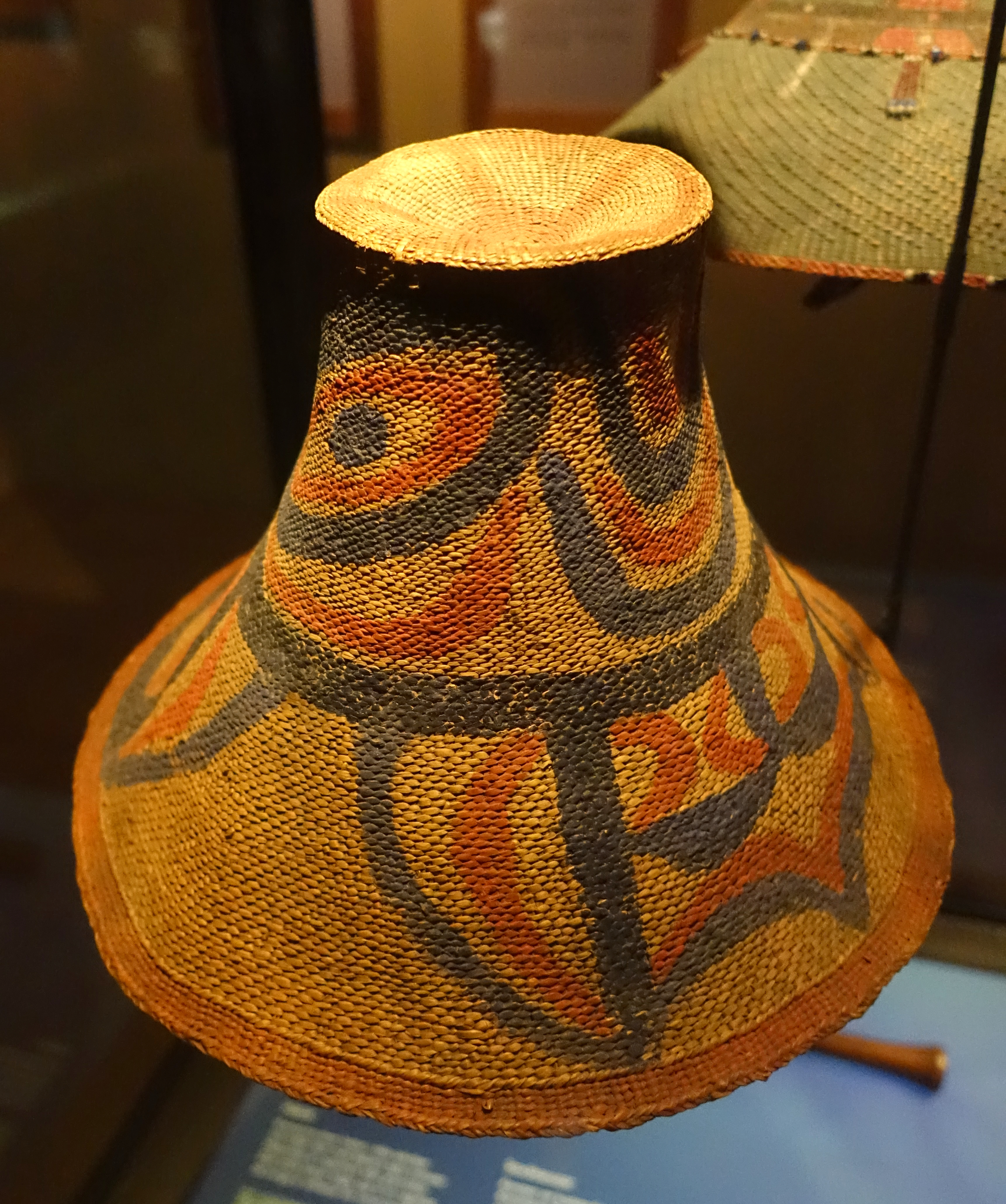
A Nuu-chah-nulth hat, similar to those crafted by Chinookans that were often sold to PFC laborers.

Consistently small stockpiles of foodstuffs at Fort Astoria created the need for frequent transactions with Chinookans for sustenance. Seasonal fish runs provided the major nutritional sources for the Columbian River-based Natives. After ceremonial rituals during each major fish run, trade for caught fish would begin in earnest with the Astorians. A constant task for Hawaiians would be to perform fisherman duties. Major fish populations active in the Columbia included the Candlefish smelt, White sturgeon, Sockeye salmon and Chinook salmon. This dependence on fish made it a primary food source for the Astorians, which caused some discontent among employees desiring a more familiar diet.

Terrestrial animals like members of the family Cervidae such as Roosevelt elk and black-tailed deer were not found in large numbers around Fort Astoria. This made them another important source of trade for the Chinookans when visiting the PFC station. Another frequent item sold when fish supplies were low in the winter was the Wapato root. Wapato provided a common source of calories for Chinookans and other nations. The Astorians described the tuber as "a good substitute for potatoes" Purchases of Wapato occurred in such volumes that a small cellar had to be created specifically to house the produce. Other typical purchases from Chinookans included manufactured goods. In particular woven hats were frequently bought for protection against the seasonal rains. These hats were tightly interwoven, making them essentially waterproof. Of benefit to the Astorians was that they were typically wide enough to cover the shoulders. Ross described the common artwork depicted them as "chequered" with various animal designs that were "not painted, but ingeniously interwoven."

Chinookans near Fort Astoria employed various means of retaining their valuable middle man position between various neighboring Indigenous peoples and the PFC. Additional tactics involved manipulating the perception neighboring Natives had of the American company. In August 1811, a small party of Chehalis visited Fort Astoria. In dialogue with them McDougall inquired why they would rarely directly trade with the PFC. The Chehalis merchants responded that Chinooks affiliated with Comcomly claimed that the Astorians were "very inveterate against their nation." McDougall concluded this story was used by Comcomly to continue his commercial hegemony over the area.

=== Fear of hostilities ===
It was not always that the Astorians, especially McDougall trusted Comcomly or Chinookans in general. His judgment of them, despite eventually marrying a daughter of Comcomly was that they were often ready to attack the fort. In particular Jones noted that he "seems to place implicit faith in any possible hostile actions by the natives."

In June 1812, the number of men at Fort Astoria were reduced to 11 Hawaiians and 39 European descendants. Fear of attack by Chinookans was high and drills were directed by McDougall frequently. A delegation of Chinookans visited Fort Astoria on 2 July quickly left after witnessing these military demonstrations. This fear by the natives convinced the Astorians that "they are not friendly disposed towards us..." having "a desire to harm us." According to Jones, this "latent distrust" of Chinookans by Astorians from this incident was probably unfounded, as they entered the post "for an innocent purpose" and were frightened by the drills.

Fears of attack did not disappear and Astorians kept themselves guarded in dealing with natives. After the Beaver left for Russian America rumors spread of a coming attack on Astoria in August 1812. There were large numbers of Chinookans and Chehalis near Comcomly's village at the time. This expedited construction on two bastions and the fort was "put in readiness for an attack." Jones has pointed out that these movements of Indigenous was very likely a part of seasonal fishing, rather than a supposed hostile gathering.

== Overland Expedition ==
As the leader of the expedition Hunt would make a number of decisions which were disastrous. The movement of Hunt's group has been described as "a company of traders forging westward in [a] haphazard fashion." He ordered the expedition to leave St. Louis just before the winter to reduce company expenses of supporting employees. The group departed on October 21, 1810 for Fort Osage. The expedition traveled 450 miles (720 km) up the Missouri River before setting up winter camp on Nodaway Island, at the mouth of Nodaway River in Andrew County, Missouri, just north of St. Joseph. French-Canadian employees made frequent purchases from the company store during the idle season, especially those hired at Michilimackinac. Small items like blue beads, vermilion, brass rings, tobacco "carrots", small axes among others were used in transactions with Missouria neighboring the camp.

In January 1811, Hunt sailed down the Missouri River to complete several pending transactions at St. Louis. It was during this time he recruited Pierre Dorion Jr., as he was the only qualified speaker of the Sioux languages in St. Louis at the time. Notably he was in debt to Manuel Lisa and the Missouri Fur Company (MFC), something that would lead to tensions between the fur companies later in the year. In the end Hunt was able to secure Dorion, on the condition that Marie and his two children be brought along as well. Once finalized, he took British naturalists John Bradbury and Thomas Nuttall with him to the Nodaway camp, as previously agreed upon. The party left St. Louis on 12 March and reached Fort Osage on the 8th of April. Early into the travel Dorion physically abused his wife and caused her to flee for a day. At the station Ramsay Crooks was waiting for them and the group recuperated for two days. The group left Fort Osage on the 10th of April and during the day Dorion "severely beat his squaw" as Marie desired to stay with newly made Osage acquaintances rather than continue with the expedition. The group reached the winter camp on the 17th. The overland group at this point amounted to almost sixty men, forty being French-Canadian voyageurs.

=== Following the Missouri ===
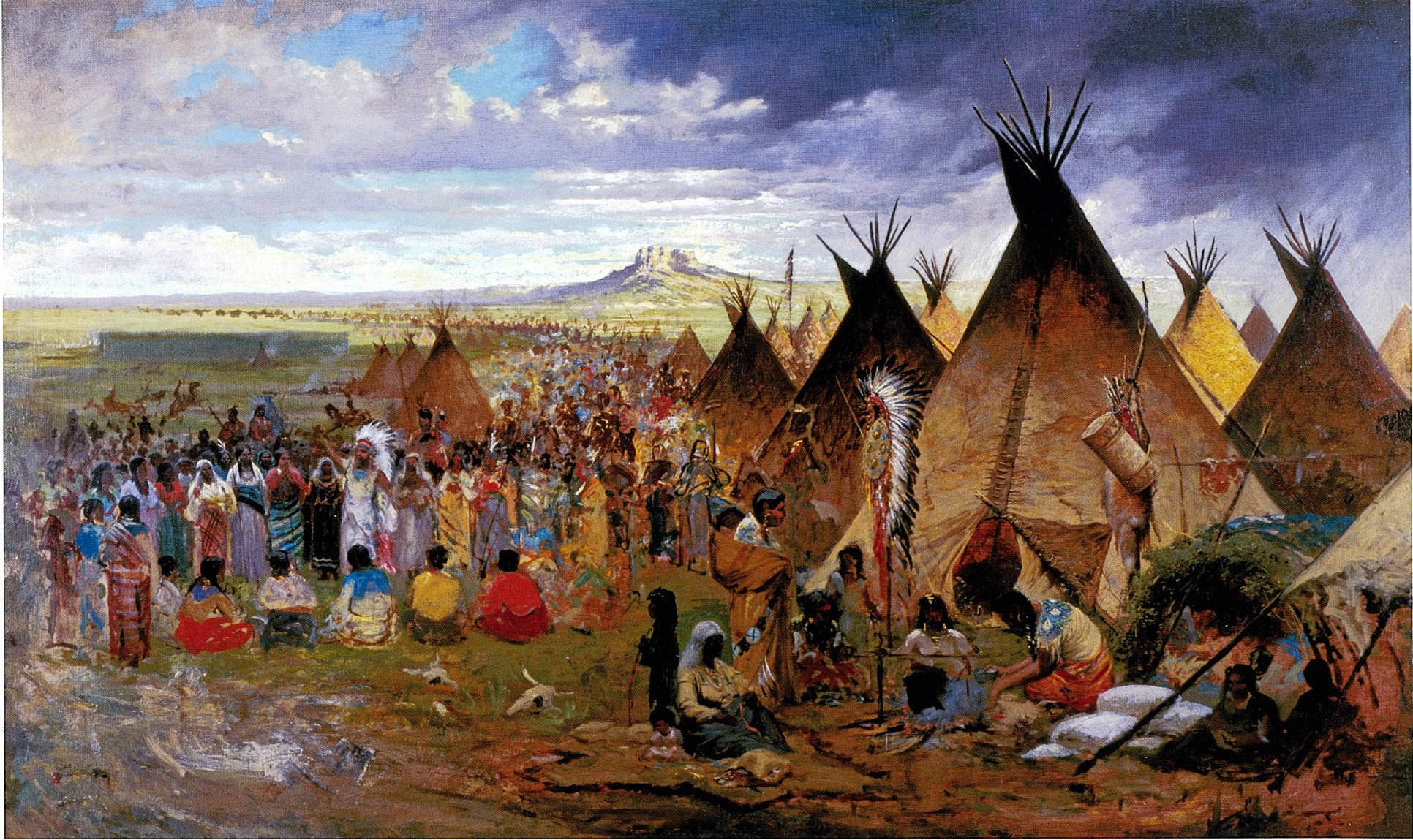
A Sioux village. Many of the Plains nations visited by the expedition had similar dwellings.

Hunt's expedition broke the Nodaway winter camp on April 21. The Astorians reached a major Omaha village in early May. Active commercial transactions were completed there, with Omaha merchants offering "jerked buffalo meat, tallow, corn, and marrow" for vermilion, beads and tobacco carrots. Bradbury detailed that the Omaha village had plots of nicotiana rustica, melons, beans, squashes, and corn under cultivation. While at the Omaha settlement, Hunt received information from several visiting Yankton Sioux that a group of Sioux was gathering further up the river to stop the expedition from traveling further.

Proceeding further the Missouri River, the Sioux party was encountered on 31 May. The Sioux bands were a conglomeration of Yankton and Lakota and had around six hundred armed men. Tensions quickly arose between the two disparate groups and both took up positions by the Missouri River. The two company howitzers and single Swivel gun were loaded with powder and fired to intimidate the Sioux bands. The artillery were then loaded with live ammunition, but the Sioux across the river began to "spread their buffalo robes before them, and moved them side to side." Dorion stopped the firing of the armaments a second time, as he understood this action by the Sioux meant they desired a parley. Peace talks were held and the Sioux explained that they had formed to prevent the PFC from trading with the neighboring nations they were at war with, the Arikara, Mandan and the Gros Ventre. Hunt explained that the expedition intended to travel to the Pacific Ocean and they had no interest in the neighboring Indigenous groups. This was found to be acceptable by the Sioux leaders, and the PFC was allowed to depart further north.

On 3 June, employees of the Missouri Fur Company under the command of Manuel Lisa were encountered on the Missouri River. Lisa reminded Dorion of his pending debt to the company, and a duel between the two men was narrowly averted by Bradbury and Henry Marie Brackenridge intervening. After this incident the rival fur companies refrained from interacting and camped on opposite sides of the Missouri River. Despite this, Lisa and Hunt led their parties north towards an Arikara village and reached it on 12 June. In a council with local leadership Lisa declared that if any of Hunt's party were harmed he'd take it as an offense against him as well. In setting the standard rate for purchasing horses, "carbines, powder, ball, tomahawks knives" were in high demand as the Arikara were planning an attack upon the Sioux. Lisa and Hunt made a deal allowing for Hunt's boats to be exchanged for additional horses, kept at Fort Lisa further up the Missouri River. Crooks was sent with a small group to fetch the horses and while they reached Fort Lisa on the 23rd, they had to wait until the 25th for Lisa to arrive to finalize the transaction. The party left the following day and returned south to Hunt's camp.

=== The Rocky Mountains ===
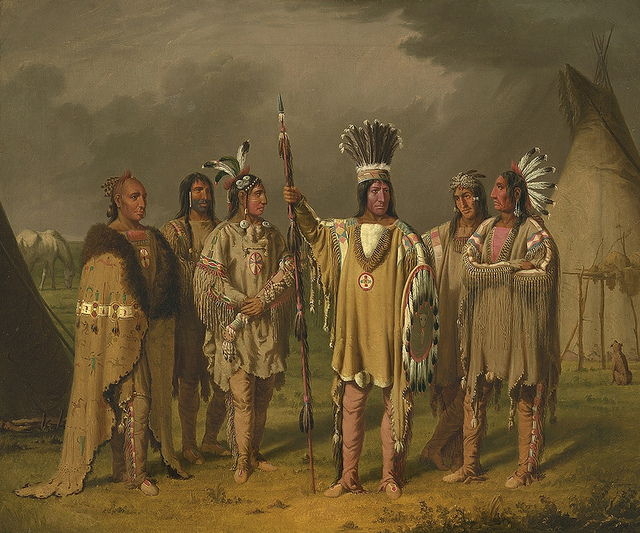
The military prowess of the various Niitsitapi peoples deterred the Overland party from continuing to follow the Lewis & Clark Expedition's path up the Missouri River.

While at the Arikara village, Hunt met and employed several American trappers that had previously worked for the MFC in modern Idaho. The men advised strongly against going into the Piikáni homelands of modern Montana. The Piikáni and other Niitsitapi nations at the time were typically unreceptive to trespass from European descendants and made a showing of military force against the Lewis and Clark Expedition. This changed Hunt's plans, who according determined it best to avoid the Niitsitapi peoples.

The expedition left their Arikara hosts in late July for the nearby Grand River. After following the Little Missouri River, the party to rest for several days while transactions were made with a band of Cheyenne. In total 36 horses were purchased from the Cheyenne. The expedition broke camp on 6 August and Hunt ordered six men to hunt Bison. Hunt's party continued southwest through the modern state of Wyoming and the hunting party rejoined on the 18th of August, having killed 8 Bison. While at the base of Cloud Peak on 30 August, a scouting party of Apsáalooke visited the camp. The following day a delegation of Apsáalooke on horseback invited them to visit their nearby village. Hunt recalled the importance of mercantile deals with the Apsáalooke stating that:

"We spent the first day of September buying some robes and belts and trading our tired, maimed horses for fresh ones... thereby augmenting the number of our horses to about 121, most of which were well-trained and able to cross the mountains."

Continuing westward towards the Continental Divide of the Americas, the PFC party followed the course of the Wind River, crossed the Divide and followed the Gros Ventre River.

=== Snake River ===
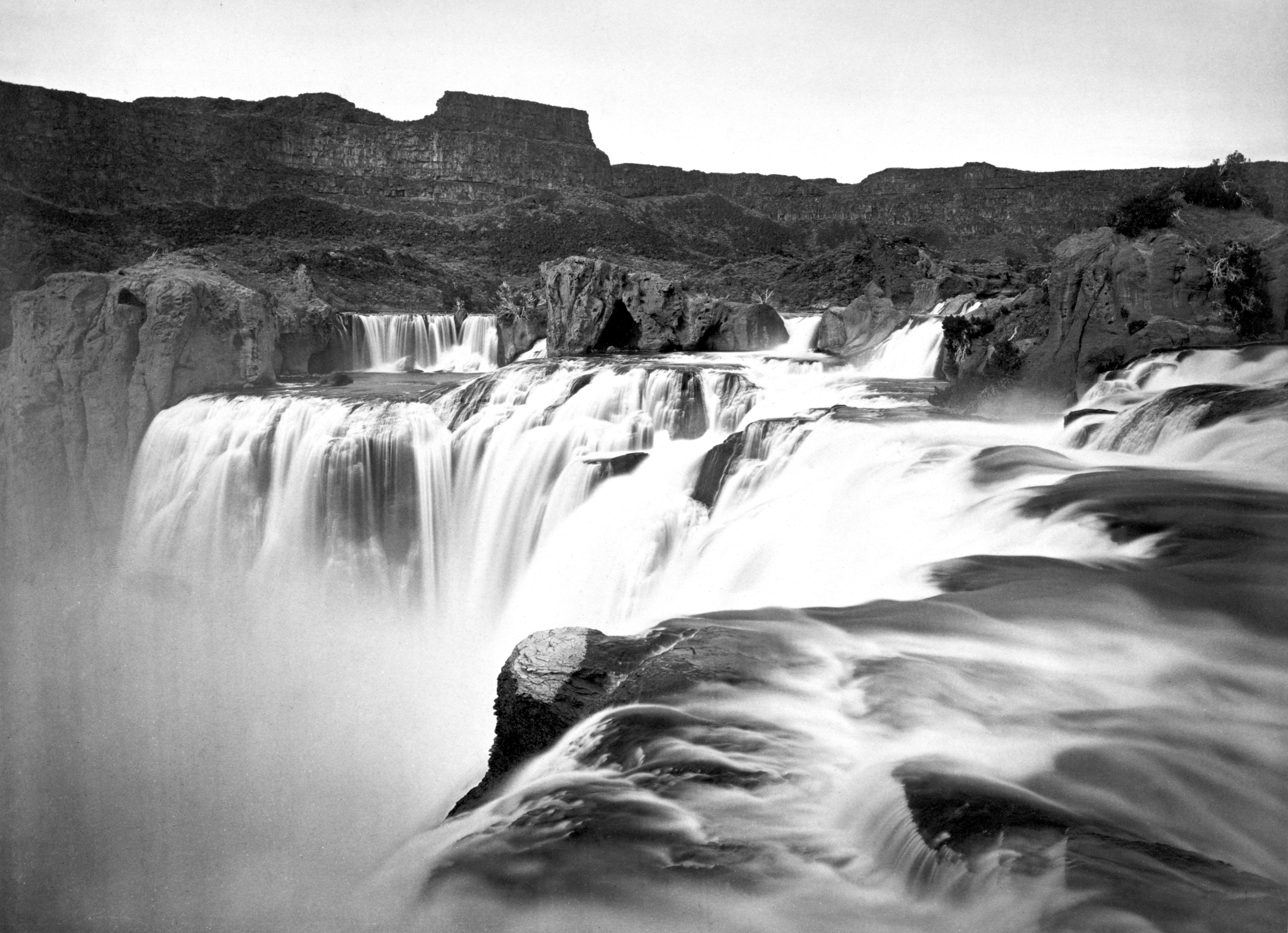
Features of the Snake River such as the Shoshone Falls would prove to be a major challenge for the Overland Party to pass.

The expedition reached Fort Henry on 8 September, made by MFC employee Andrew Henry the previous year, near present-day St. Anthony and made a camp there. The post was later abandoned. While at the location work began creating enough canoes necessary to take the party down Henry's Fork and later the Snake River or so called "Mad River" to the Columbia. This was done as it felt no longer necessary to travel with pack horses, a decision that would soon cause more issues for the party. On the 10th, four men and two Natives under the command of Joseph Miller departed to begin trapping in the area. The horses that remained in the possession of the PFC, amounting to seventy-seven, were left in the care of "two young Snakes". The party departed from Fort Henry on 19 September on the newly made canoes.

Traveling down the Snake River proved highly difficult due to the many rapids such as Caldron Linn. The party was forced to perform multiple portages due to these fierce currents. Over course of the remainder of September through early November, four incidents of canoes capsizing killed one man meant major losses in trade goods and food supplies. In addition to the hardships caused from attempting to follow the course of the Snake more problems arose due to dwindling food stockpiles. By 31 October there was enough provisions to last for five days. In early November there were not many animals in the area to gather for food, the few that were caught by the hunting parties were beaver. The traveling partners agreed to end travel by canoe, finding the mode of transportation too difficult continue using. Hunt ordered several groups go in various directions to contact neighboring Indigenous for material support. In the meantime the PFC expedition began to deposit its trade goods in small caches to lighten the workload of the men.

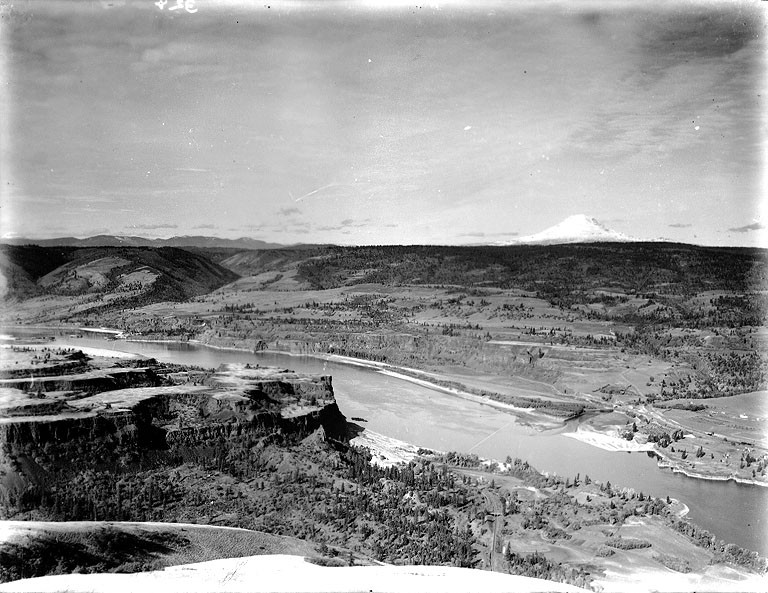
The Columbia River east of the Cascade Range.

At the suggestion of Ramsay Crooks, the expedition was divided into two parties of nineteen men each, with each member receiving 5$\tfrac{1}{4}$ pounds of dried meat. A third small group was led by Donald MacKenzie to reach Fort Astoria ahead of the main contingent. All that remained in the company stores was "forty pounds of corn, twenty of fat, and nearly five pounds of bouillon tablets." On 9 November the two groups began traveling on either side of the Snake. Soon the cliffs became too steep to allow an easy descent to the river banks for water. Sources of hydration became very limited and despite intercourse with several groups of Indigenous the situation did not improve. Water was collected on 20 November after it rained the previous night. Up to that point "several Canadians had begun to drink their urine" in desperation.

Crooks reunited with Hunt's party in early December alone. Crooks was so weakened from starvation that his pace would have slowed the expedition immensely. Hunt left two men to tend to Crooks while the main group pushed forward. Several villages of Northern Shoshone were visited and vitally needed food sources such as horses along with "some dried fish, a few roots, and some pounded dried cherries" were purchased. A Shoshone was convinced to act as a scout to guide the PFC group to the Umatilla River. On 23 December, thirteen men assigned to Crooks party were met who gave the unfortunate news that they had not seen him since he left Hunt's group.

=== Reaching the Columbia ===
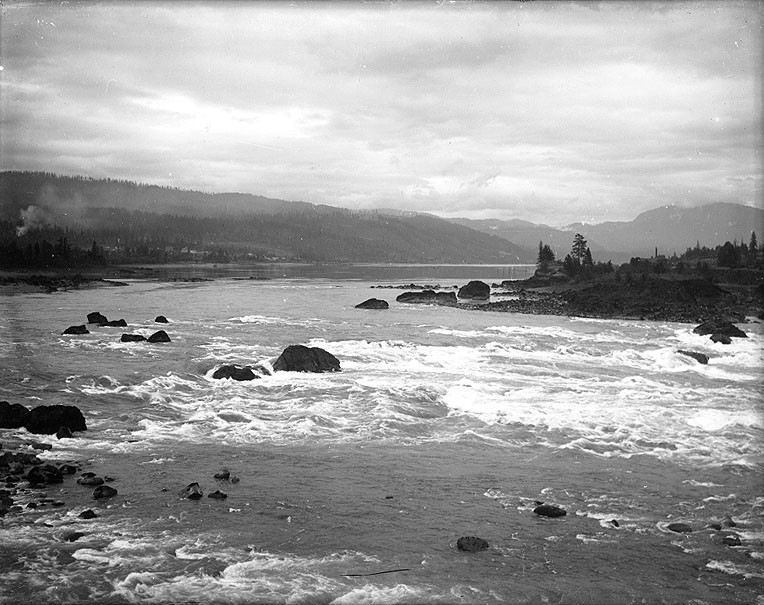
The Cascade Rapids on the Columbia River.

Donald Stuart and his party of Robert McClellan, John Reed, Étienne Lucier, and seven other men continued to march ahead of the two main PFC groups. While traversing the lands of the Niimíipu, a stranded employee of the PFC, Archibald Pelton, was found and brought along with the party. They finally arrived at Fort Astoria on 18 January 1812. The party was described as clothed in "nothing but fluttering rags." While waiting for the main contingent under Hunt to arrive, the men informed the personnel of the overland journey's progress from St. Louis.

Hunt's group found a band of Liksiyu on 8 January, whom hosted the downtrodden expedition for a week. Meals of dried mule deer meat and loafs of pounded Camas bulbs were provided during their stay. While exploring the area, Hunt found out from particular Liksiyu that there was an active white fur trader in the area. This would turn out to be Jacques Raphaël Finlay, located at the NWC Spokane House. On 21 January, the expedition finally reached the banks of the Columbia River. Hunt soon entered discussions with the Wasco-Wishram when entering their villages. It was here he learned the destruction of the Tonquin the previous year. The remaining three horses of the party were used to purchase two canoes from Wasco merchants. Several portages were required on the Columbia, especially at the Cascade Rapids. The main body of the expedition reached Fort Astoria on 15 February to much fanfare. Besides Hunt there was thirty men, along with Marie Aioe Dorion and her two children on six canoes. McDougall was apprehensive about feeding all these additional people, a sentiment Franchère shared, as the post had recently faced issues with provisions. Due to seasonal salmon runs harvested by various Chinookans however, there was a sizable food supply at Fort Astoria.

== Activities in 1812 ==
=== Attempted expedition to interior ===
In late March, three clerks in command of fourteen men were ordered to depart for the hinterlands. Robert Stuart was take needed trade goods to Fort Okanogan. John Reed was to take food supplies to the stranded Crooks and Day, in addition to later taking dispatches for Astor to St. Louis. Russel Farnham was to retrieve the caches left by Hunt near Fort Henry. To complete several of the necessary portages at the Dalles, Wascos were hired to help freight the trade goods. Two bales of trade goods and later some personal items were however stolen. Stuart ordered his men to complete the portages during the night. A skirmish arose at sunrise between arriving Wascos and Reed, who was defending several bales of goods with one man. After being grievously injured, Reed lost the box containing the dispatches. Additional PFC arrived at the scene and two natives were reportedly killed in the struggle. The Chinookans returned in larger numbers and armed several hours later. To avoid more bloodshed Stuart was able to negotiate a settlement with the aggrieved families. In return for a reported six blankets and tobacco, the Astorians were able to continue their journey up the Columbia.

The conflict raised security concerns of crossing into further Indigenous nations, forcing the three parties to all travel to Fort Okanogan. Arriving there on the 24th of April, the clerks, voyageurs and trappers departed for Fort Astoria on the 29th, leaving Alexander Ross and two men at the station. Stockpiles of pelts accumulated there amounted to an estimated 2,500 were taken as well. Near the mouth of the Umatilla River the party was surprised to loudly hear English shouted among an assembled group of Indigenous, perhaps Umatilla. Ramsay Crooks and John Day were there them, exhausted from several months of tribulations. Wandering over a large area, the two men at one point received the help of an Umatilla noble, Yeck-a-tap-am, who "in particular treated us like a father." After being robbed by another band of Natives, Crooks and Day were able to find the Umatilla once more. Taking two worn men with them, the party reached Fort Astoria on 11 May.

=== The Beaver ===
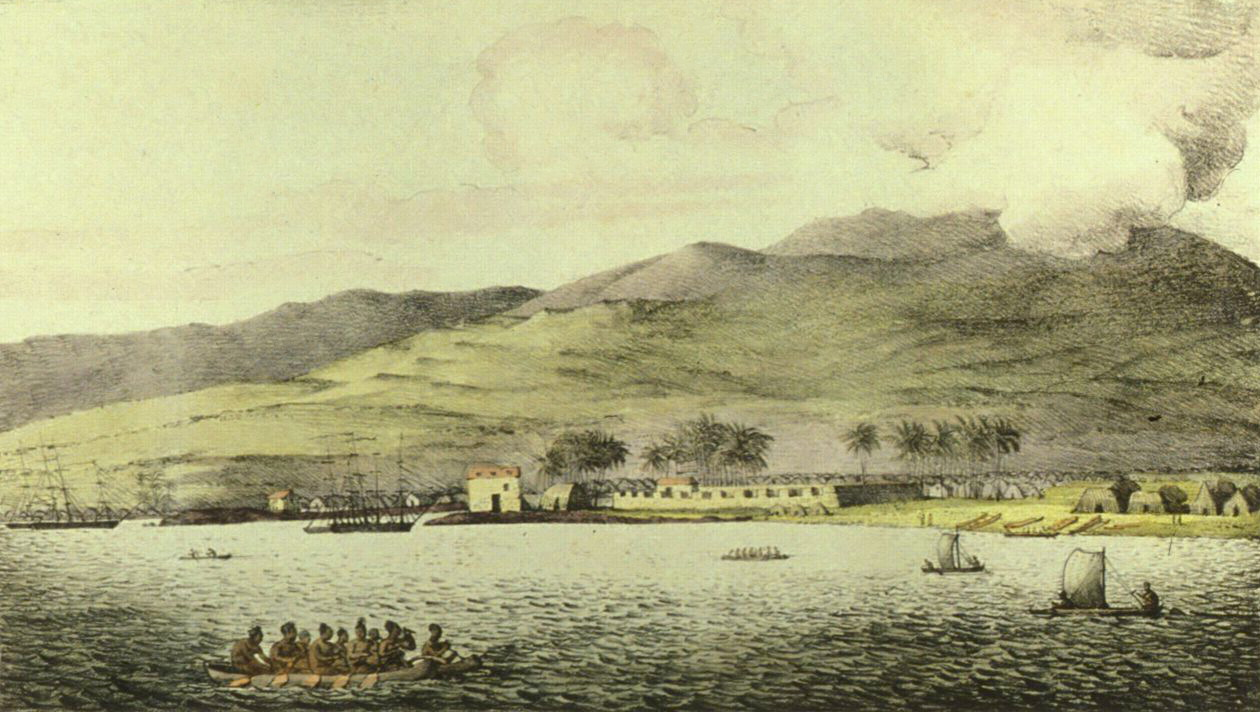
The Kingdom of Hawaii would for decades provide manpower for visiting naval and fur merchants, including the Pacific Fur Company.

The Beaver was the second supply ship sent by Astor to the Pacific Coast, with Cornelius Sowle as its captain. It sailed from New York City in October 1811 and reached Fort Astoria on 9 May 1812. While stopping at the Kingdom of Hawaii, more men were recruited as Kanakas for the company. After unloading necessary supplies to the Fort, the Beaver sailed to Russian America. Hunt joined the crew to negotiate with RAC governor Alexander Andreyevich Baranov at New Archangel. The cargo was purchased by the Russians amounted to ₽124,000 in value, with payment in seal skins located on Saint Paul Island. Orders from Astor dictated that the ship to return to the Columbia, but the Beaver was in poor repair and sailed for the Kingdom of Hawaii instead. Hunt was left there as the Beaver went west to Guangzhou. News of the War of 1812 kept the ship at the port for the remainder of the conflict. The Beaver then proceeded to New York City and entered the city harbor in 1816.

=== Second interior expedition ===
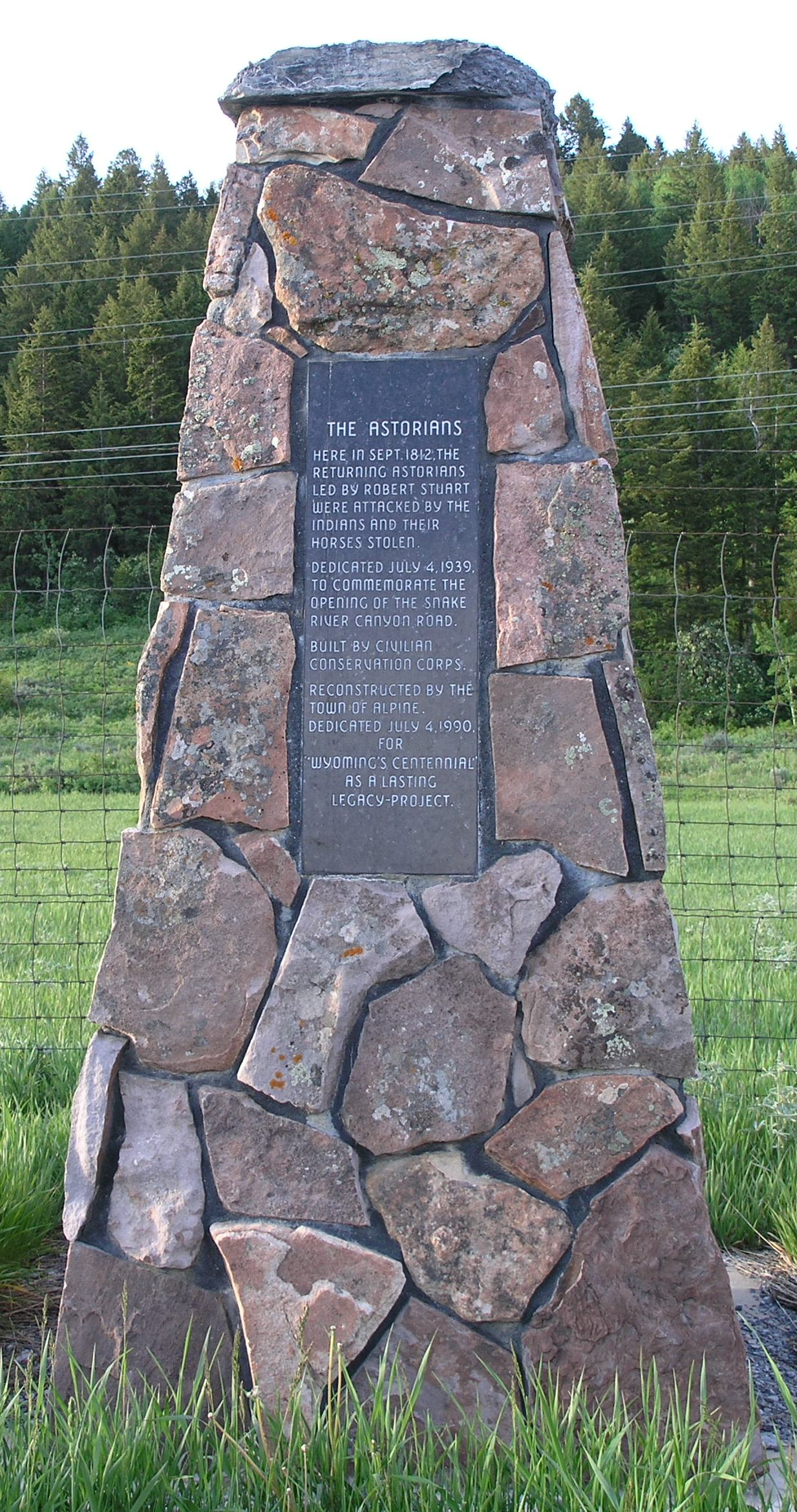
A plaque marking the spot along the Snake River in modern Wyoming where Stuart's party had horses stolen from them by a Native raiding party in September 1812.

Failure to accomplish many of the tasks set for work the hinterland earlier in 1812 did not discourage the Astorians. The supplies and reinforcements brought aboard the Beaver made management consider "grander schemes" for the summer. New establishments would be created to challenge the NWC across the region in addition to pursuing trading expeditions among various Indigenous nations. A total of almost 60 men were directed to locations from the Willamette Valley of Oregon to the Bitterroot Valley of Montana and the vicinity of modern Kamloops in British Columbia. The movement of workers to their assigned locales began in late June. Robert Stuart led a party bound for St. Louis to send information to Astor as Reed had attempted earlier in the year. His group was composed two French-Canadians and four Americans. John Day became afflicted by mental instability and Stuart paid several Multnomah men of Cathlapotle village to transport him back to Fort Astoria. The group would make the important discovery of the South Pass, critical for the later westward movement of tens of thousands of American migrants.

=== Liquidation ===
While Astor intended it to gain control of the regional fur trade in Oregon country, the Pacific Fur Company ultimately floundered. This came from a variety of issues, many of them due to the contentious diplomatic relationship between the United Kingdom and the United States. The destruction of the Tonquin left Fort Astoria undersupplied and heavily reliant on neighboring Chinookans for sustenance. Competition from the interior-based North West Company threatened to the loss of major fur producing areas. The Overland Expedition arrived many months later than planned by Astor. Wilson Hunt's inexperience in wilderness travel along with dwindling supplies left the majority of his expedition facing starvation.

While the arrival of the Beaver brought much needed trading goods, foodstuffs and additional employees, events would soon see the ending of the PFC. News of the War of 1812 was relayed to the Astorians at Fort Spokane, and Donald McKenzie brought that information to Fort Astoria in January 1813. As Franchere recalled, a council of clerks and management noted that the Astorians were "almost to a man British subjects", leading them to agree to "abandon the establishment" of Fort Astoria and its secondary stations. NWC personnel reported that a British warship en route to capture the station. The PFC management agreed to sell its assets across the Oregon Country to the NWC, which was formalized on 23 October 1813 with the raising of the Union Jack, and in honor of George III of the United Kingdom Fort Astoria was renamed Fort George. On 30 November 1813 HMS Racoon arrived at the Columbia River, expecting to take an American post as a prize of war, but found it was now owned by British subjects. On board the Racoon was John MacDonald who oversaw the formal takeover of PFC properties. In March 1814 the NWC's ship Isaac Todd arrived on the Columbia, delivering much needed supplies to Fort George. She then sailed on to China, and on to England. She carried some PFC personnel, many of whom were former employees of the NWC, back to England, from where they returned to Montreal.

== Legacy ==
Authors of first hand accounts about the PFC

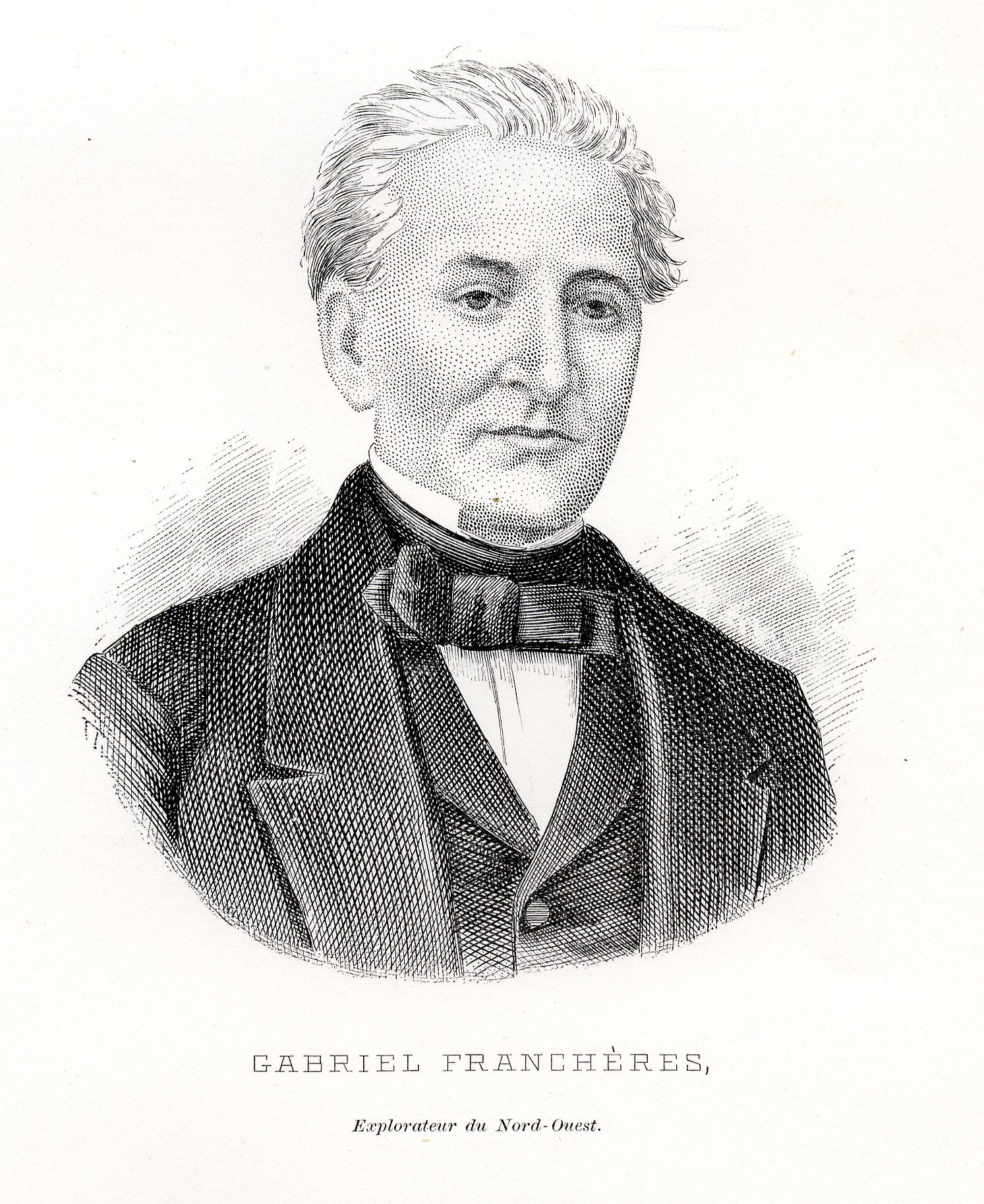
Gabriel Franchère

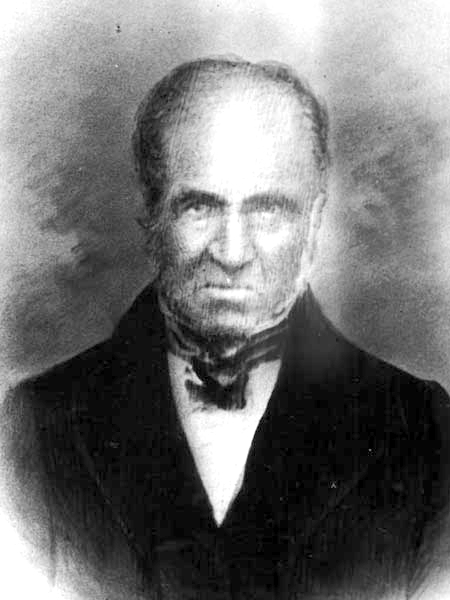
Alexander Ross

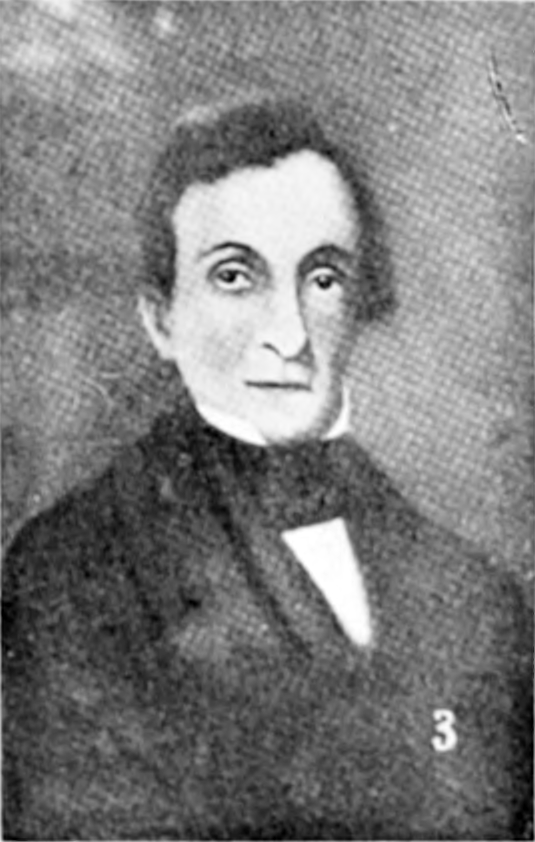
Wilson Price Hunt

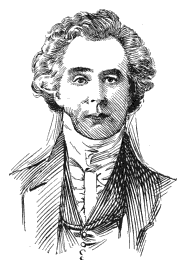
Robert Stuart

During a NWC shareholder meeting in July 1814, the partners declared that the sale "greatly facilitated the getting out of the [Pacific] Country our competitors the American Fur Company. They also concluded that the sale of Astoria and other PFC properties gave "considerable" advancements for their company. Plans were considered to use the stations much in the same manner Astor meant, for trade with China. The Columbia also offered a less costly means of supplying the interior NWC posts in the region.

The Treaty of 1818 established a "joint occupancy" of the Pacific Northwest between the United States and the United Kingdom was confirmed, each nation agreeing not to inhibit the activities of each other's citizens. During 1821, the British Government ordered the NWC to be merged in their long time rivals, the Hudson's Bay Company. In a short time the HBC controlled the majority of the fur trade across the Pacific Northwest. This was done in a manner that "the Americans were forced to acknowledge that Astor's dream" of a multi-continent economic web "had been realized... by his enterprising and far-sighted competitors." The PFC held additional influence on the region in some particular and subtle ways. The book Astoria was written by Washington Irving in 1836, after interviewing some men connected to the venture and consulting documents held by Astor. Two surviving members of the Astorians, Étienne Lucier and Joseph Gervais, would later become farmers on the French Prairie and participate in the Champoeg Meetings.

== See also ==
- Maritime Fur Trade
- North West Company
- Astoria (book)
