= James Ross (Canadian lawyer) =

James Ross (9 May 1835 – 20 September 1871) was a Métis journalist, lawyer, and member of the provisional government established by Louis Riel during the Red River Rebellion of 1869–1870. He graduated with honours from the University of Toronto in 1857. He also received a Master of Arts from the same university later in 1865. He was the Métis son of Scottish immigrant author and Hudson's Bay Company fur trader/administrator Alexander Ross and Sarah (Timentwa), an Okanagan tribal woman. James married Margaret Smith in Toronto on 18 May 1858.

Ross represented the views of the anglophone community in the Red River Colony, defusing tensions between the French- and English-speaking delegates of the Métis National Committee. He served on the Convention of Forty (January 25, 1870 to February 10, 1870) as a representative of St. John's Parish. Ross served as translator of the speeches of the French delegates, and also served on the "Committee of Six" responsible for drafting the "List of Rights" that were presented to the Government of Canada during the negotiations that led to the Manitoba Act of 1870 and the entry of the province of Manitoba into the Canadian Confederation. James Ross died of tuberculosis on September 20, 1871.
