= Wilson Price Hunt =

American pioneer

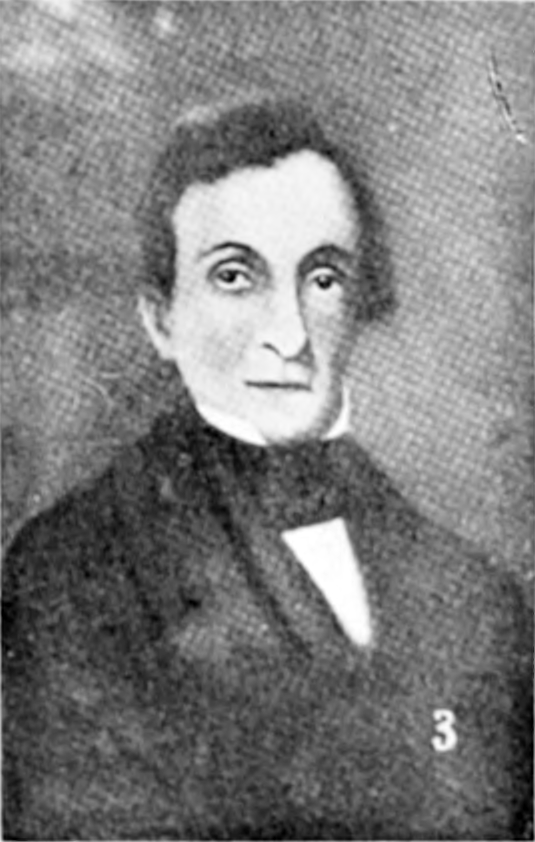
- Born: March 20, 1783; Asbury, New Jersey
- Died: April 13, 1842 (aged 59); Saint Louis, Missouri
- Occupations: Explorer, pioneer, farmer, postmaster

Wilson Price Hunt (March 26, 1783 – April 13, 1842) was an early pioneer and explorer of the Oregon Country in the Pacific Northwest of North America. Employed as an agent in the fur trade under John Jacob Astor, Hunt organized and led the greater part of a group of about 60 men on an overland expedition to establish a fur trading outpost at the mouth of the Columbia River. The Astorians, as they have become known, were the first major party to cross to the Pacific after the Lewis and Clark Expedition.

== Biography ==
Historical records refer to Hunt both as "William" and as "Wilson." Son of Abraham Hunt and originally from Trenton, New Jersey, Hunt moved to St. Louis in 1804 and worked selling various merchandise for several years. In 1810 he became connected with John Jacob Astor. Astor, as part of his plan to gain a foothold on the Northwest coast and enable the development and prosecution of a more profitable trade with the Chinese, formed the Pacific Fur Company. The six partners in the company (not including Astor) were all Canadians and former prominent figures in the North West Company, except for Hunt who was the sole American. Hunt was second in line behind Astor as "partner and first resident agent", acting as his personal representative in his absence.

The company sent two simultaneous expeditions: one by sea directly to the mouth of the Columbia to establish the post, and one over the land in order to demonstrate the practicability of the route as a supply line. Hunt was placed in charge of the overland expedition because he did not like to get wet, and as was to assume charge at Astoria upon his arrival.

Hunt had never before traveled into the interior of the west but had been engaged in the Indian trade second hand while at St. Louis supplying traders with goods and equipment. Donald McKenzie, also a partner in the company, accompanied Hunt. McKenzie had extensive wilderness experience, having served ten years in the interior as a clerk for the Northwest Company. "Under… two such leaders as Hunt and McKenzie, he [Astor] had, in fact, everything to hope and little to fear."

On July 5, 1810, Hunt and McKenzie set out for St. Louis from Montreal with a number of Canadian voyageurs. En route, they continued to recruit men for the expedition. Hunt had difficulty finding quality men at Mackinaw and St. Louis. At Mackinaw, he was discouraged by the quality of the men, finding most to be "drinking in the morning, drunk at noon and dead drunk at night." In addition, he faced a steady competition for recruits amongst the more established Northwest and Mackinaw companies in Michilimackinac and the Missouri Fur Company in St. Louis. Having finally assembled a party, Hunt arrived at Nodaway, Missouri, on November 16, 1810, and settled into winter quarters. They departed April 22, 1811.

In the course of traveling up the Missouri River, Hunt recruited several former Missouri Fur Company men returning from the interior. His original plan had been to ascend the Missouri and then the Yellowstone River, but information provided by these men regarding the hostility of the Blackfoot on the upper Missouri caused him to change course and cross to the Columbia by land.

Hunt purchased horses from the Arikara tribe near present-day Pierre, South Dakota and began the long trek over land westward. The party passed along the borders of the Black Hills and Bighorn mountains then crossed the Wind River mountains into the valley of the Green River by way of Union Pass. Here they descended the Hoback River to its junction with the Snake River and crossed Teton Pass to the abandoned Fort Henry, arriving October 18, 1811. Knowing that they were now on the headwaters of the Columbia, the party anticipated the majority of their struggles to be over, and Hunt yielded to the desires of his men to abandon the horses and embark downstream by canoe. This was a fateful decision as the course of the Snake River later proved to be completely unnavigable by canoe, forcing the party to travel by foot and causing the men to endure severe hardship. After nine days of attempting to travel the river, they lost a man and two canoes in the rapids and reconsidered their plan. Embarking on foot, they divided into four parties and took different routes to approach the mouth of the Columbia. Hunt's party arrived on February 15, 1812.

The trip from Missouri to the future site of Astoria, Oregon took 340 days. According to his own account, Hunt traveled 2,073 miles (3,336 km) from the village of the Arikaras, in present-day South Dakota, to the end of the journey. A return expedition overland was led by Robert Stuart, who discovered South Pass, a key feature of the soon-to-be-established Oregon Trail.

On August 4, 1812, Hunt sailed on the newly arrived ship sent by Astor, the Beaver, in order to establish trade with the Russian establishment at New Archangel in modern-day Alaska, leaving Duncan McDougall in charge of the fort. Hunt remained absent from Astoria longer than intended, forced to wait for payment at New Archangel and then detouring to the Hawaiian Islands to repair damage to the Beaver sustained in a storm. While in the Hawaiian Islands, he learned of the war that had broken out between the US and Britain and chartered the ship Albatros to land him at Astoria. In the meantime, McDougal, faced with managing the precarious situation of Astoria, concluded an agreement to sell the fort to the Northwest Company. Upon his return to Astoria, Hunt was displeased with the decision and questioned the motives of the Canadian partners, but despite his protest he was bound to their decision. Soon after arriving, he again left the fort, this time on the Albatros bound for the Marquesas and the Hawaiian Islands for the purposes of bringing a large quantity of the furs accumulated at Astoria to market, acquiring a ship and a load of provisions, and returning home the Hawaiian Islanders who were in the employ of the Company at Astoria. While in the Hawaiian Islands, Hunt purchased the brig the Pedlar, which he provisioned and sailed to Astoria in order to conduct business related to the transfer of the fort to the British. The Pedlar then traveled again to New Archangel and then to Kamchatka before being captured in August 1814 by the Spanish on smuggling charges and held on the coast of California at San Louis Obispo for two months. After being released, the Pedlar made its way back to the Hawaiian Islands then ultimately onto China to procure a cargo of Chinese goods for trade in New York. Hunt arrived in New York with his cargo in October 1816.

Hunt ultimately returned to St. Louis in 1817 and purchased a large tract of land southwest of the city, upon which he farmed and made improvements until his death in 1842. He was appointed postmaster of St. Louis in 1822 by President Monroe and held the position until 1840.

Hunt's expedition is one of many scenes depicted on the Astoria Column, and his name is inscribed in a frieze in the Oregon State Senate chamber of the Oregon State Capitol.

== See also ==
- John Jacob Astor
- Pacific Fur Company
- North West Company
- David Thompson, a Canadian explorer who arrived at Astoria shortly before the Hunt party.
- Beaver (ship)
