= Nankeen =

Durable, pale yellowish cotton cloth developed in China

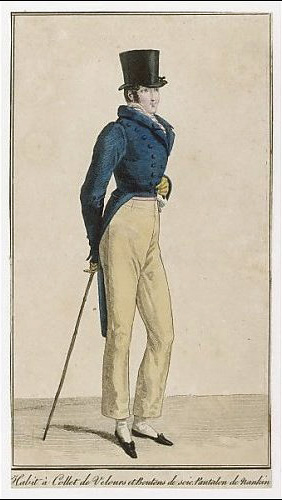
- Nankeen trousers circa 1818
- Material type: Pale yellowish cloth

Nankeen (also called Nankeen cloth) is a kind of pale yellowish cloth originally made in Nanjing, China from a yellow variety of cotton, but subsequently manufactured from ordinary cotton that is then dyed.

The term blue nankeen describes hand-printed fabric of artistic refinement and primitive simplicity, which originated on the Silk Road over three thousand years ago.

Hand-carved stencils, originally made from wood but now from heavy paper, are prepared and a mix of soybean flour and slaked lime is applied through the openings of the stencil onto the 100% cotton fabric. When dry, the fabric is then dipped numerous times into the large tubs containing the indigo dye. After the desired color is achieved and the fabric has dried, the paste is scraped off, revealing the white patterns on the blue cloth. The fabric is then washed, dried, and ironed before fabrication.

== Derived uses ==
Nankeen also refers to:

- Trousers made of nankeen (singular or plural).
- Pale yellow or buff; the color of nankeen.
- Bobbin lace made from unbleached silk (usually in plural form nankins).
- Kind of usually blue and white porcelain of Chinese style, originally exported to Europe from Nanjing and later copied by European potters.
- Of the colour of nankeen; pale yellow or buff; also from their colour, part of the name of many animals and plants (chiefly Australian).
  - Nankeen gum, the bimble box, Eucalyptus populnea, a tree of eastern Australia having a fibrous bark and glossy green leaves.
  - Nankeen kestrel, also called nankeen hawk, the Australian kestrel, Falco cenchroides, a small falcon found in Australia and neighboring islands.
  - Nankeen night heron, also called nankeen bird, nankeen crane, nankeen heron, rufous night heron or its scientific name Nycticorax caledonicus, a stocky nocturnal heron found in Australasia and Indonesia

== See also ==
- Silk Road
