= Robert Stuart (explorer) =

American and Canadian fur trader

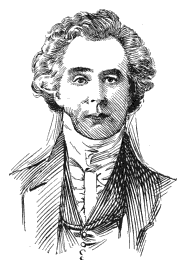
- Born: February 19, 1785; Strathyre, Perthshire, Scotland
- Died: October 28, 1848 (aged 63); Detroit, Michigan, U.S.
- Occupations: Fur trader, explorer
- Spouse: Emma Elizabeth Sullivan

Robert Stuart (February 19, 1785 – October 28, 1848) was a Scottish-born, Canadian and American fur trader, best known as a member of the first European-American party to cross South Pass during an overland expedition from Fort Astoria to Saint Louis in 1811. He was a member of the North West Company (NWC) until recruited by John Jacob Astor to develop the new Pacific Fur Company, which was based at Fort Astoria, on the coast of present-day Oregon. Astor intended the venture to develop a continent-wide commercial empire in fur trading.

== Life ==
Family history states that Robert Stuart was born in Strathyre, in the historic parish of Balquhidder, but grew up in Callander, both towns in Perthshire, about 15 and 20 miles (24 and 32 km) northwest of Stirling, Scotland. Around 1807, he joined an uncle, David Stuart, in Montreal to work as a clerk in the fur trade for the Canadian North West Company. In 1810, three years later, he and his uncle had been recruited into Astor's Pacific Fur Company.

Stuart was age 25 when he sailed aboard a Pacific Fur Company ship, the Tonquin, on its voyage to the Falkland Islands. He held a pistol to the head of the ship's captain, Jonathan Thorn, when Thorn attempted to leave the Falkland Islands without Stuart's uncle David, another of Astor's partners. They sailed around Cape Horn and up the West coast of North America to the Columbia River. The Tonquin crossed the Columbia Bar and established Fort Astoria (located in modern Astoria, Oregon) in May 1811. After leaving supplies and traders at the newly created outpost, the ship and crew traveled north to Clayoquot Sound on Vancouver Island. The Tonquin crew engaged in commercial negotiations with members of the Tla-o-qui-aht nation in June. An altercation arose, with the entire crew killed except a single hired translator and the ship destroyed. After the incident, the traders had to make arrangements to communicate with Astor, since they had no idea when a ship might call at Fort Astoria.

Thus, Stuart accompanied an overland expedition of seven men carrying word of the Tonquin's fate to St. Louis. A larger party ascended the Columbia River as far as it could, procuring horses from Indians as they got further inland.

The group split near the future Wallula, Washington, and Stuart's mounted party rode south into the general vicinity of future Pendleton, Oregon. The expedition then headed east and southeast, and entered the future Idaho on August 12, 1812. They remained on the west and south side of the Snake River, observing the mouth of the Boise River on the opposite side on the 15th. Continuing along the south side of the Snake, they reached the American Falls on September 5, Soda Springs on the 9th and arrived near the Idaho border on the 13th. During this trek from the Pendleton area, Stuart's party followed what would later become perhaps the most important leg of the Oregon Trail route across Oregon and Idaho.

However, after crossing into Wyoming they made a major detour away from the future trail. The description in Stuart's journal shows that they looped 100 miles (160 km) (“as the crow flies”) north into the Teton Valley in Idaho and crossed Teton Pass into Jackson Hole. They then made their way south, reaching the general vicinity of the future Oregon Trail in Wyoming on October 19. Without the detour, they could have arrived at the same location within a matter of days after leaving Idaho for the first time. They then turned northeast and crossed South Pass on the Continental Divide two days later. Stuart wrote, “The summit of this mountain, whose form appears to be owing to some volcanic eruption, is flat, and exhibits a plain of more than 3 miles square (7.8 km^{2})”

Stuart's party spent the winter on the upper North Platte River and reached St. Louis at the end of April 1813. Stuart himself did not reach New York to consult with Astor until June 23. Despite the bad news about the Tonquin, Astor still had high hopes for his venture. Regardless of the efforts of Stuart and others, the Pacific Fur Company soon collapsed due to the War of 1812, with Fort Astoria being sold to the North West Company in 1813. Later on, the Hudson's Bay Company tried to discourage American trappers from operating in the Pacific Northwest, establishing an overland route between Fort Astoria and the York Factory on Hudson Bay called the York Factory Express. The route was partially based on the paths explored by Stuart.

Stuart's path blazed almost the entire segment of the Oregon Trail between the Columbia and the Missouri River. His journal is a detailed account of the wintertime trip, and Washington Irving's Astoria is said to be based on it. Presented to Astor and President James Madison, and published in France, the journal did not make the location of the South Pass widely known. In 1824, U.S. trappers Jedediah Smith and Thomas Fitzpatrick rediscovered the South Pass route across the Rockies.

Later, that would lead to some dispute about who deserved priority in the discovery. Thus, in 1856, Ramsay Crooks, one of Stuart's party, wrote a letter describing their journey:

"In 1811, the overland party of Mr. Astor's expedition [from St. Louis to Fort Astoria], under the command of Mr. Wilson P. Hunt, of Trenton, New Jersey, although numbering sixty well armed men, found the Indians so very troublesome in the country of the Yellowstone River, that the party of seven persons who left Astoria toward the end of June, 1812, considering it dangerous to pass again by the route of 1811, turned toward the southeast as soon as they had crossed the main chain of the Rocky Mountains, and, after several days' journey, came through the celebrated 'South Pass' in the month of November, 1812. ...Pursuing from thence an easterly course, they fell upon the River Platte of the Missouri, where they passed the winter and reached St. Louis in April, 1813."

On July 21, 1813, about a month after he met with Astor, Stuart married Emma Elizabeth Sullivan, a native of New York City. They would have nine children together. He continued in Astor's employ, perhaps consulting on various plans to recoup the loss of Astoria. In 1817 or 1819 (accounts vary), Stuart became manager of the American Fur Company's "Northern Department" based on Mackinac Island, Michigan. It was here that Stuart met William Montague Ferry. Stuart saw the enterprising young Ferry as a perfect prospect for someone to run his affairs in the budding lumber industry in Michigan. Ferry proposed to Stuart that the Grand River Valley held great possibility. By June 1834, Stuart placed funds in the hands of Ferry to settle in what would become Grand Haven and set up a land and lumber enterprise, sharing the profits.

In 1833 he is mentioned as working for the American Fur Company, in a treaty at Chicago ceding land from the Chippewa, Ottawa and Potawatomi tribes, as apparently a friend to the tribes.

It is not entirely clear when Stuart began to invest in Detroit real estate, but around 1835–1836 he built a home and soon moved his family there. He was also Treasurer of the State of Michigan from 1840 to 1841. He died on October 28, 1848, and is buried at the historic Elmwood Cemetery in Detroit.

== Legacy ==
The Robert Stuart House is one of many historic buildings on Mackinac Island. The building has been made into a museum of the fur trading industry, covering the time period begun by French merchants, British businessmen, and Native Americans.

Robert Stuart Middle School in Twin Falls, Idaho, is named after the explorer.

== Other References ==
- Philip Ashton Rollins, ed., The Discovery of the Oregon Trail: Robert Stuart's Narratives of His Overland Trip Eastward from Astoria in 1812-13, University of Nebraska Press, 1995, ISBN 0-8032-9234-1
- G.P.V. and Helen B. Akrigg, British Columbia Chronicle: Adventurers by Sea and Land, Discovery Press, Vancouver, 1975
- Laton McCartney, Across the Great Divide: Robert Stuart and the Discovery of the Oregon Trail, Simon & Schuster, 2003, ISBN 0-7432-4924-0

Political offices
Preceded by Peter Desnoyers	State Treasurer of Michigan; 1840-1841	Succeeded by George W. Germain
