= Donald McKenzie (explorer) =

Scottish-Canadian explorer, fur trader and Governor of the Red River Colony

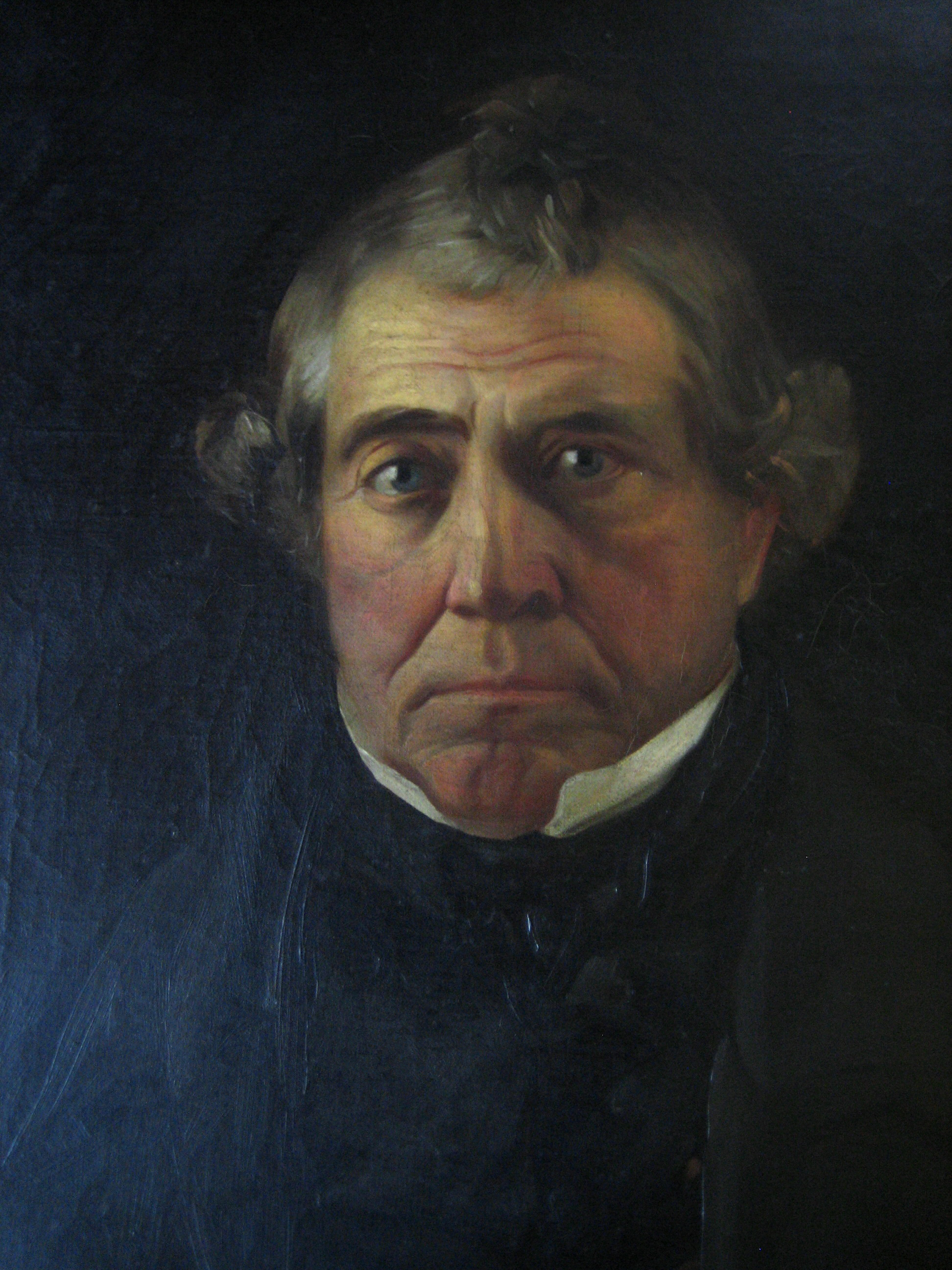
- Born: Donald McKenzie; March 2, 1783; Near Inverness, Scotland
- Died: January 20, 1851 (aged 67); Mayville, New York
- Resting place: Mayville Cemetery, Mayville, New York
- Occupations: fur trader, explorer, High Constable, Governor
- Employer(s): North West Company, Hudson's Bay Company
- Spouse: Wife 1 - " Country wife - A half breed woman" [possibly Mary Mackay daughter of Alexander as documented in HBC archives.] Wife 2 - Adelgonda Humbert Droz
- Children: Wife 1 Caroline, Rachel, Donald (metis) [ref: service sheet - HBC Archives Winnipeg Wife 2 Jemima, Catherine, Roderick, Noel, Fenella, Alexander, Alice, Henry, William Peacock, Donalda, Adelgonda, Celestia, Humbertson

Donald McKenzie (16 June 1783 – 20 January 1851) was a Scottish-Canadian explorer, fur trader and Governor of the Red River Colony from 1821 to 1834.

== Early life ==
Born in Scotland, he was a member of the Mackenzie clan, the son of Alexander Mackenzie of Achnaclerach and Catherine Ross. He was the youngest of several brothers, these included Roderick, Henry, and James, many of whom later became involved in the North American fur trade as members of the North West Company. Through his family, he was also related to Sir Alexander Mackenzie, the explorer who completed the first recorded transcontinental crossing of North America north of Mexico.

McKenzie is believed to have received a relatively good education for the period, and some accounts suggest that he was initially intended for the ministry. Around 1800, at approximately 17 years of age, McKenzie emigrated from Scotland to Canada, where he joined his brothers in the fur trade.

== Career ==
McKenzie entered the service of the North West Company in 1801 as a clerk. During his early years with the company, he was stationed in the Great Lakes region, by 1806 at Fond du Lac, where he gained practical experience in trade operations, logistics of the fur trade, and surviving the harsh winters of the Great Lakes region. In 1810, he left North West Company to become a partner in the Pacific Fur Company (PFC), financed by John Jacob Astor.

=== Pacific Fur Company ===
McKenzie traveled west from St. Louis, Missouri, to the Pacific Northwest with an expedition of PFC employees. The group divided in southern Idaho after experiencing hard times. McKenzie's fraction, consisting of twelve total, traveled north, eventually finding the Salmon and Clearwater Rivers. They proceeded down the lower Snake River and Columbia River by canoe, and were the first Overland Astorians to reach Fort Astoria, on January 18, 1812.

McKenzie spent two years exploring and trading for the Pacific Fur Company in the Willamette Valley, along the Columbia River, in eastern Washington and in northern and central Idaho. When PFC sold its assets and stations to the North West Company in 1813, McKenzie was appointed to carry all important papers back east, which he did in 1814.

=== Fort Nez Percés and Idaho explorations ===
McKenzie became reacquainted with the North West Company and returned to the Columbia region in 1816. In 1818, he and Alexander Ross built Fort Nez Percés near the confluence of the Columbia and Walla Walla Rivers. McKenzie and his trappers made the first extensive exploration of what became southern Idaho starting in 1818, with annual expeditions continuing through 1821. His trapping ventures covered most of southern Idaho as well as parts of eastern Oregon, northern Utah and western Wyoming. Many of the names for rivers there can be traced to this period.

=== Governor ===
With the merger of the North West Company and Hudson's Bay Company in 1821, McKenzie was appointed Governor of the Red River Colony. He left the Pacific Northwest and moved to Fort Garry for a decade, serving as governor for most of present-day Manitoba, Saskatchewan, and Alberta, Canada.

== Legacy ==
In 1834, McKenzie retired and moved to Mayville, New York, where he lived for two decades. McKenzie entertained and advised distinguished visitors such as Daniel Webster and William H. Seward. He gave advice on where the international boundary should be established for the Oregon Territory, and may have planted the seeds that led to the purchase of Alaska from Russia. McKenzie Pass and the McKenzie River in Oregon are named for him.

== See also ==
- Matooskie, also known as Nancy McKenzie, his niece
