= Alexander Ross (fur trader) =

Canadian fur trader and author (1783–1856)

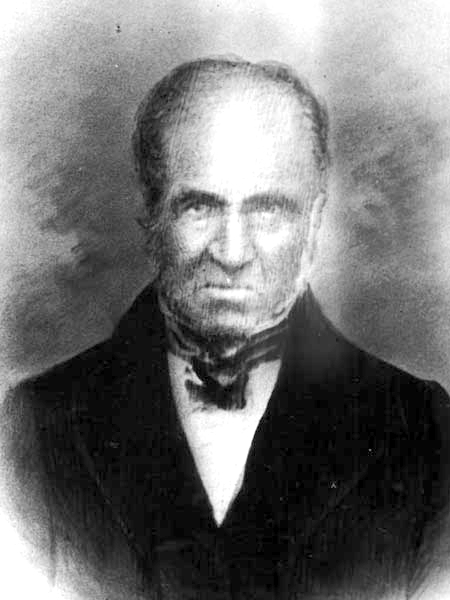
- Alexander Ross later in life
- Born: May 9, 1783; Morayshire, Scotland
- Died: October 23, 1856 (aged 73); Kildonan, Manitoba, Canada
- Resting place: the churchyard at Kildonan
- Occupation(s): schoolmaster, farmer, fur trader, author
- Employer(s): Pacific Fur Company, North West Company, Hudson's Bay Company
- Spouse: Sally/Sarah Timentwa (the daughter of an Okanagan chief)
- Children: James, William, Henrietta, Mary

Alexander Ross (May 9, 1783 – October 23, 1856) was a Scots Canadian fur trader and author.

== Early life ==
Ross emigrated to Upper Canada, present day (Ontario), from Scotland about 1805.

== Pacific Fur Company ==
In 1811, while working for John Jacob Astor's Pacific Fur Company, Ross took part in the founding of Fort Astoria, a fur-trading post at the mouth of the Columbia River. During the same year he led a detachment up the Columbia River and founded Fort Okanogan where during the winter he was the sole PFC employee at the trading post. During his solitary posting, Ross' hair greyed from the stress of being socially isolated among the welcoming Syilx people, "savages who had never seen a white man before." Nights were a constant source of worry for the lonely Ross, despite having several hundred Syilxs encamped near by performing sentry duties. One evening his watchdog alerted Ross to an intruder.

In this perplexing dilemma I got my hand, with as little noise as possible, I got my hand, with my gun, and gradually drawing out the ramrod, tried, with my right arm stretched out, to stir up the embers, so that I might see... I concluded that the enemy must be skulking in the cellar... when, lo! What was there but a skunk sitting on a roll of tobacco! The shot blew it almost to atoms, and so delicately perfumed everything in the house that I was scarcely able to live in it for days afterwards...

== North West Company ==
Ross joined the North West Company in 1813, after they acquired all of the Pacific Fur Company properties, renaming Fort Astoria to Fort George. Ross and three Indians crossed the North Cascades on a project of discovery in 1814. Ross's account is vague but they probably crossed the mountains via Cascade Pass.

In 1818 Ross acted as scribe for a trading party from the North West Company who traveled within sight of the Teton Range in modern Wyoming. He and trapper Daniel Potts apparently viewed some of the thermal features of what is today Yellowstone National Park. Each of them produced an account of these features, with Ross reporting that "... boiling fountain having different degrees of temperature were very numerous; one or two were so very hot as to boil meat."(Breining, p. 69)

Ross described the lower Columbia River area of the Pacific Northwest as follows:

The banks of the river throughout are low and skirted in the distance by a chain of moderately high lands on each side, interspersed here and there with clumps of wide spreading oaks, groves of pine, and a variety of other kinds of woods. Between these high lands lie what is called the valley of the Wallamitte [sic], the frequented haunts of innumerable herds of elk and deer.... . In ascending the river the surrounding country is most delightful, and the first barrier to be meet with is about forty miles up from its mouth [sic]. Here the navigation is interrupted by a ledge of rocks, running across the river from side to side in the form of an irregular horseshoe, over which the whole body of water falls at one leap down a precipice of about forty feet, called the Falls.

Fort Nez Percés was established by the North West Company in 1818 under the direction traders Ross and Donald MacKenzie. Located on the east bank of the Columbia River, the station was half a mile north of the mouth of the Walla Walla River and a few miles below the mouth of the Snake River. The site was first claimed and posted by David Thompson several years prior.

== Hudson's Bay Company ==
The North West Company was merged with the Hudson's Bay Company by the British government in 1821. The majority of the NWC employees, including Ross, continued laboring at their respective locations for the HBC. Ross served another four years as factor at Fort Nez Percés after the merger. While working for the HBC, Ross explored various territories of the Pacific Northwest. In 1824, while searching the mountain wilderness of what is present day Idaho, known to them as Columbia District, for beaver, Ross came up the Wood River and discovered Galena Summit on September 18. Leading a large brigade of Hudson's Bay Company trappers, he wondered if he could get through unknown mountains and rocky defiles that obstructed his passage back to his base of operations at present Challis. Unwilling to turn back he pressed on to explore Stanley Basin and the difficult canyon beyond. When he reached Challis on October 5, 1824, he had traveled the route now followed by Idaho State Highway 75 from Bellevue to Salmon through mostly unexplored land.

== Later years ==
Ross subsequently moved to the Red River Colony, present-day Manitoba, where he served as Sheriff, Post master, and a member of the council. His daughter Mary married George Flett on 26 November 1840. Flett was later to become a prominent Presbyterian missionary. Ross published a number of books including the notable The Red River Settlement.

== Legacy ==
Ross House is a small museum that highlights the life of Alexander Ross and his family. It is located in the Point Douglas area of Winnipeg.

== Works ==
- Adventures Of The First Settlers On The Oregon...River, (1849)
- The Fur Hunters Of The Far West, (1855)
- The Red River Settlement, (1856)
- Letters Of A Pioneer, Alexander Ross, (1903), (autobiography, edited by George Bryce)
