= Comcomly =

Native American leader of the Lower Chinook

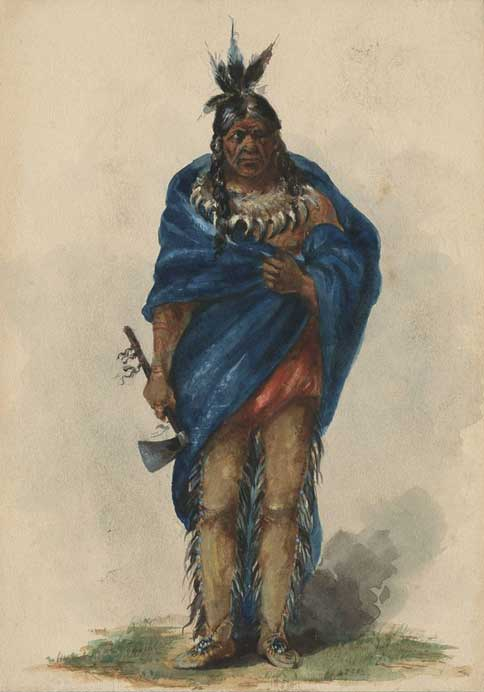
- Chief Comcomly as he may have appeared in the early 1800s

Lower Chinook leader

Personal details
- Born: 1765 Ilwaco, Washington
- Died: 1830 (aged 64–65)
- Cause of death: Malaria
- Resting place: Pacific County, Washington
- Children: Elvamox (Marianne), Raven (Princess Sunday), Ilchee (Princess Of Wales), kah-at-lin or Song Bird daughter of Comcomly’s Chehalis wife (Princess Margaret)
- Known for: skill with diplomacy and trade

Comcomly (or Concomly) (1765–1830) was a Native American leader of the Lower Chinook, a group of Chinookan peoples indigenous to the Pacific Northwest, who inhabited the area near Ilwaco, Washington. Concomly spoke Lower Chinook and was known for his skill with diplomacy and trade.

== About ==
Concomly was described by Washington Irving in the book Astoria as "a shrewd old savage, with but one eye," who also noted his trade and diplomacy skills. Comcomly was characterized by modern historian James Ronda as a talented diplomat and shrewd businessman. He was friendly to the British and Euro-American explorers whom he encountered, including Robert Gray and George Vancouver.

Concomly met Lewis and Clark in 1805 who awarded him with peace medals. He assisted the Pacific Fur Company, also known as the Astor Expedition in the early 1810s, and offered to help the Americans fight the British during the War of 1812, but Astoria, Oregon was sold to the British instead. Concomly piloted Hudson's Bay Company ships up the Columbia and was entertained at Fort Vancouver by John McLoughlin.

In contemporaneous journals, Concomly was referred to as Chief or, at times, as "'King", a derogatory term.

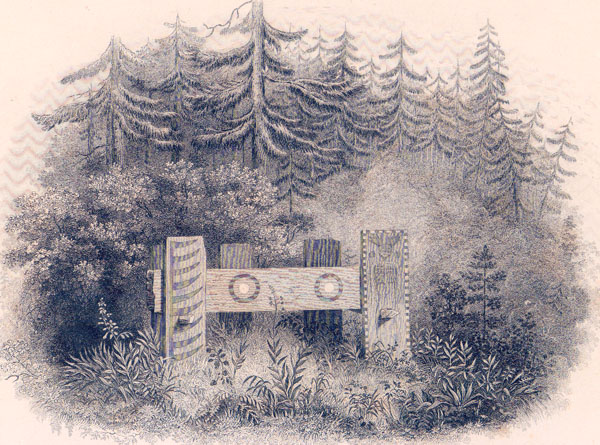
Comcomly's tomb; engraving after Alfred Thomas Agate

== Family ==
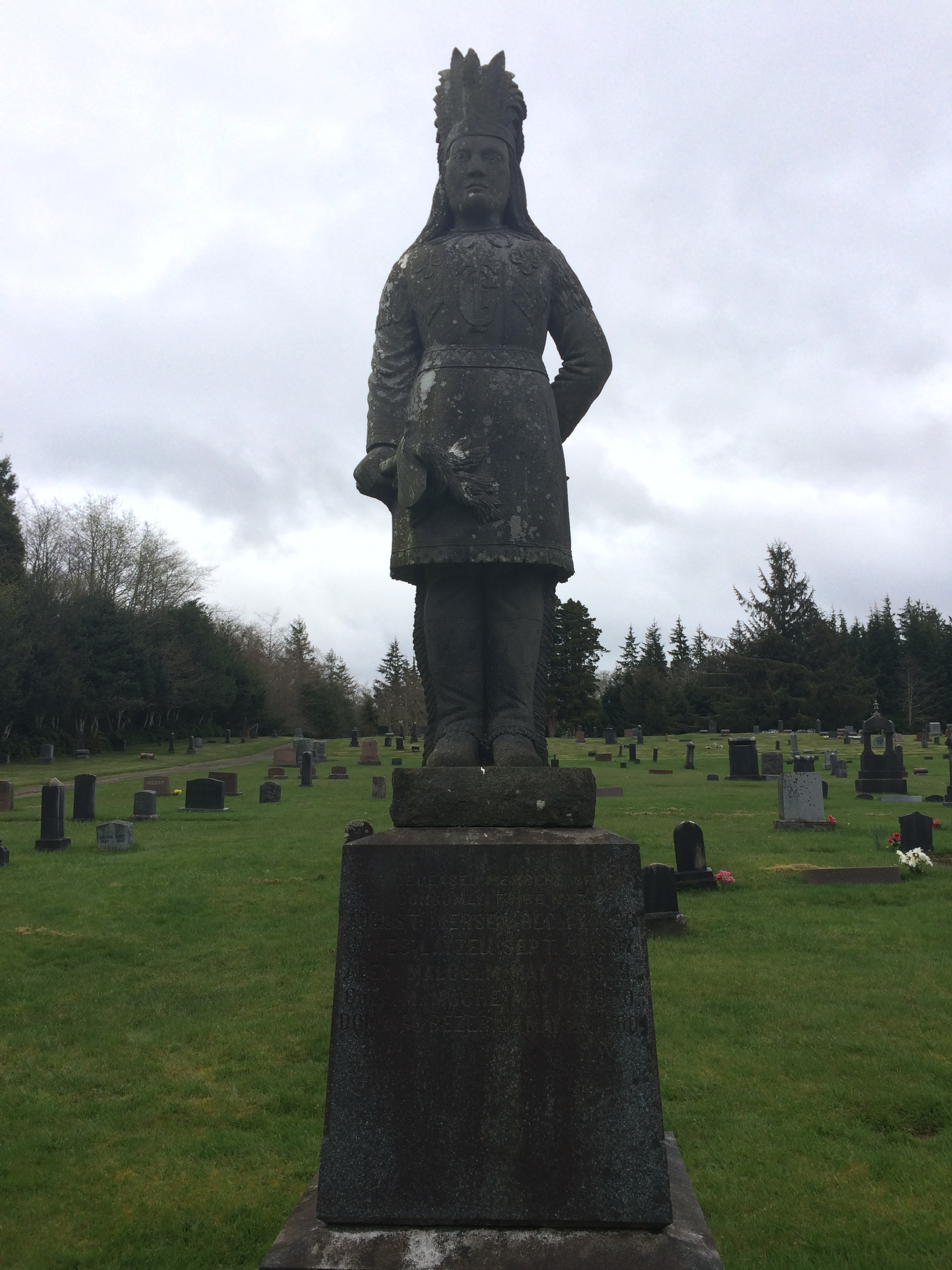
Cenotaph commemorating the Comcomly family, Greenwood Cemetery, Astoria, Oregon

Concomly was reported to have several wives. His daughter Ilchee (also Princess of Wales), married Duncan McDougall of the Pacific Fur Company He returned to Canada without her. She later married Chief Casino.

Comcomly's daughter Koale'xoa (also Raven or Princess Sunday), married Archibald McDonald a Scottish-born trader. She died giving birth to their son, Ranald MacDonald.

=== Descendants ===
Descendants of Comcomly include Chinook elder and historian Catherine Troeh and United States Ambassador J. Christopher Stevens, who perished in Libya during the 2012 militant attack on the US consulate in Benghazi.

== Death ==
A malaria epidemic that occurred in 1830–33 in the Willamette Valley resulted in a tremendous loss of Native American lives. Malaria was one of several diseases brought by colonizers that killed an estimated 150,000 Native peoples near the confluence of the Willamette and Columbia Rivers in Oregon and Washington state between 1829 and 1833. Comcomly died in 1830 after an "intermittent fever" epidemic, also called "cold sick" and presumed to be malaria, struck his tribe.

His remains were interred in a canoe, per Chinook custom, in the family burial ground. In 1835, Comcomly's elongated skull was stolen from his grave by Hudson Bay Company physician Dr. Meredith Gairdner and sent to Scotland for scientific study. It was displayed in England at the Royal Naval Hospital Haslar Museum. Although damaged in The Blitz during World War II, the skull was eventually sent to the Clatsop County Historical Society in Astoria in 1953, and then to the Smithsonian Institution in 1956. In 1972, Conconmly's skull was finally repatriated to Chinook tribal members for reburial.

== Namesakes ==
There was a station of the Oregon Electric Railway in Marion County named "Concomly". His name also appears on Concomly Road in the Salem, Oregon area. Chief Concomly Park in Scappoose, Oregon opened in 2019 and is named for him.
