= Duncan McDougall (fur trader) =

Scottish-Canadian fur trader (died 1818)

Duncan McDougall was a native of Scotland who first appears in history as a clerk with the North West Company (NWC) in 1801. This position was likely as a result of his uncles, Angus Shaw and Alexander McDougall, who were both partners in the NWC.

In 1803 McDougall was in charge of building a post at Fort George River on the east coast of Ungava Bay at the mouth of the George River, Quebec.

By 1810, Duncan had gone to work for John Jacob Astor and the Pacific Fur Company. He led the party that established Fort Astoria in Oregon, married Ilchee Moon Woman, daughter of Chief Comcomly of the Chinook Confederacy, and left her in 1813. By 1813 the Nor'westers had purchased Astoria and McDougall became a partner in the NWC in 1816. In 1817 he returned east to Fort William with Angus Bethune and others.

He agreed to take charge of the Winnipeg River district of the NWC and travelled there later in the year.

He died at Fort Bas de la Rivière on 25 October 1818.
