= Gabriel Franchère =

French Canadian author and explorer

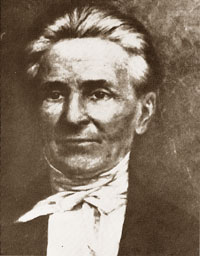
Gabriel Franchère

Gabriel Franchère ( 3 November 1786 – 12 April 1863) was a French Canadian author and explorer of the Pacific Northwest.

Franchère was born in Montreal to Gabriel Franchère (4 March 1752 – 16 May 1832) and Marie-Félicité Morin (20 August 1760 – 28 September 1807). He later joined the Pacific Fur Company as a merchant apprentice, arriving at Fort Astoria on the Tonquin. After Astoria was sold to the North West Company, Franchère returned to Montreal overland in 1814. He was employed for a time by John Jacob Astor in Montreal. He wrote Narrative of a Voyage to the Northwest Coast of America, which was published in 1819. This work was translated into English and edited in 1851, and later re-released as part of the General Series of the Champlain Society in 1969. The untranslated version was one of Washington Irving's sources for his book Astoria.

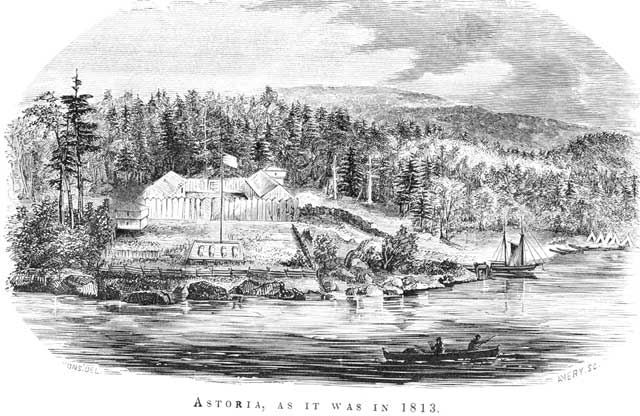
Franchère's 1813 sketch of Fort Astoria

The mountain Franchère Peak in the Canadian Rockies was named in his honor in 1917.
