= Battle of Woody Point =

1811 conflict between American fur traders and the indigenous Tla-o-qui-aht people

- Part of The Maritime Fur Trade
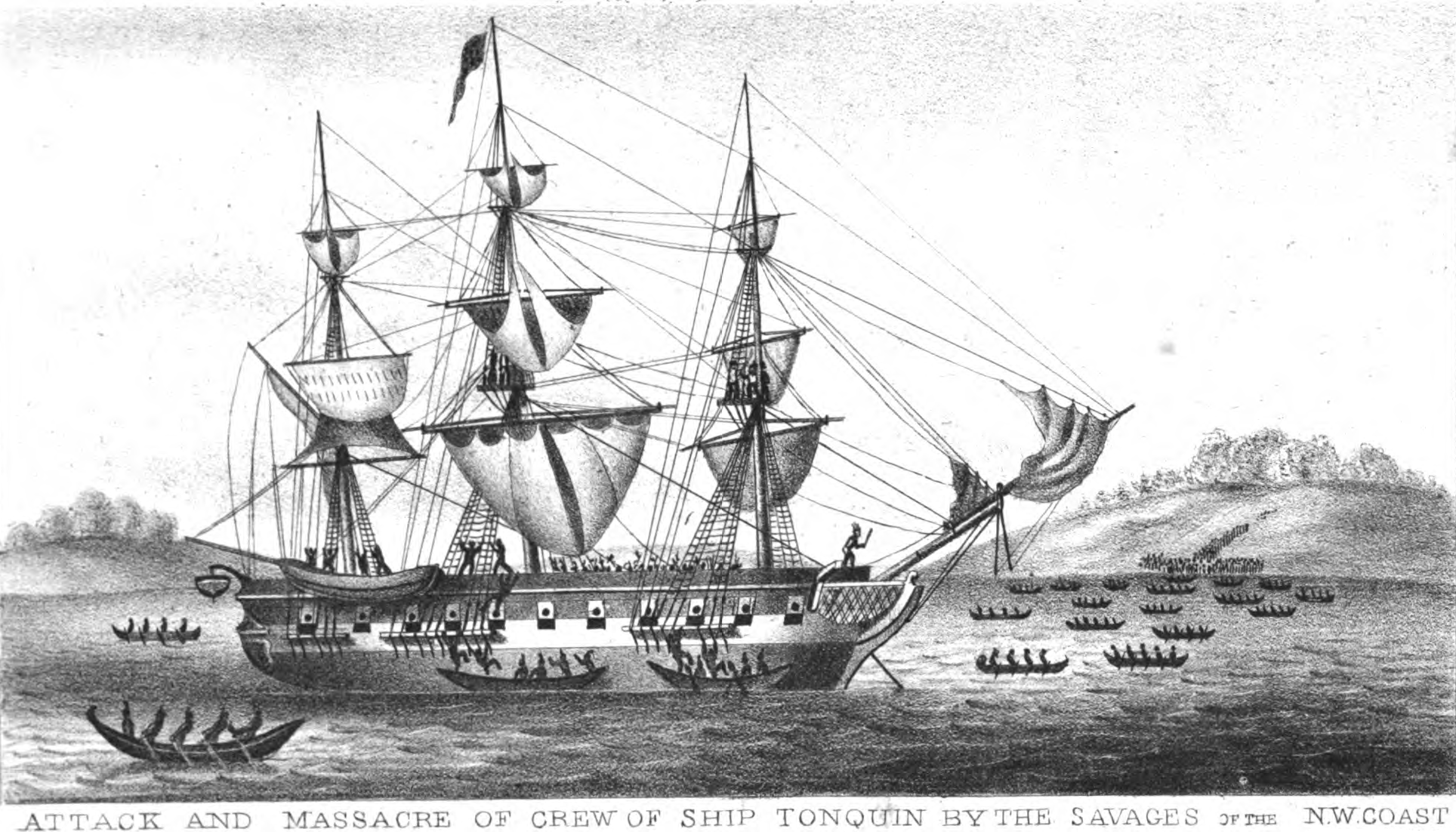
- The Tonquin being boarded by Tla-o-qui-aht
Date	June 15–16, 1811; 215 years ago
Location	Clayoquot Sound, off Woody Point, Vancouver Island, British Columbia, Canada
Result	Ship destroyed

Belligerents
Pacific Fur Company	Nuu-chah-nulth

Commanders and leaders
Jonathan Thorn †	unknown

Strength
1 barque 23 men 10 cannons	2 war-canoes

Casualties and losses
29 killed 1 bark scuttled	~200 killed or wounded

The Battle of Woody Point was an incident in western Canada in June 1811 involving the Tla-o-qui-aht natives of the Pacific Northwest and the Tonquin, an American merchant ship of the Astor Expedition. The vessel had traveled to Clayoquot Sound off Vancouver Island to trade for furs. Following an argument begun during the bartering, the Tla-o-qui-aht captured the vessel and massacred most of the crew; one remaining sailor then destroyed her by detonating the powder magazine.

== Background ==
On March 22, 1811, the Tonquin, a 290-ton barque commanded by Lieutenant Jonathan Thorn, reached the Columbia River with the intention of trading with the natives of the northern Pacific coast. To do this a trading post was necessary. After sailing around the mouth of the river for a while, the traders established Fort Astoria, the first American claim on the Pacific coast. The Tonquin had departed New York the previous September, with brief stops in the Falkland Islands in the South Atlantic and the Sandwich (Hawaiian) Islands in the mid-Pacific. Thorn had previous disputes with his crew on the journey, including marooning sailors on the Falkland Islands, only bringing them back after being threatened by other crew members.

After establishing a base of operations, the traders were free to explore the region in pursuit of fine furs.

The Tonquin was crewed by twenty-three men at the time of the battle, and carried ten cannons. Though the vessel was American-flagged and commanded by a United States Navy officer, most of her crew were British subjects. On June 5, the Tonquin left Fort Astoria and sailed north to trade with the Nuu-chah-nulth around Nootka Sound. About two weeks later, off Vancouver Island, at a place named Woody Point, the Tonquin began trading with the Tla-o-qui-aht Nuu-chah-nulth.

== Battle ==
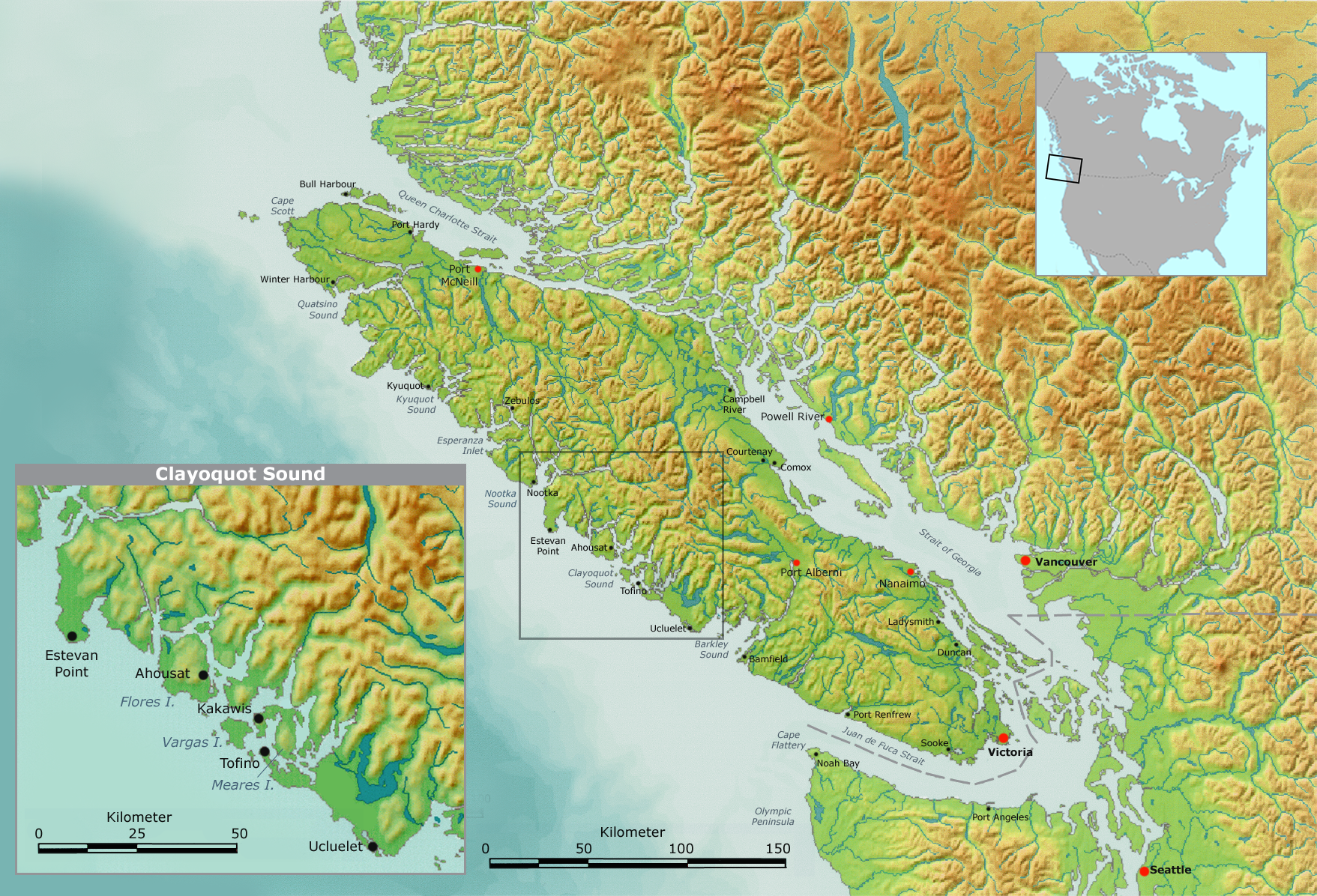
A map of Vancouver Island with an inset of Clayoquot Sound

On June 14, a Tla-o-qui-aht chief came aboard the Tonquin. Lieutenant Thorn hoped to purchase sea otter pelts which were offered by the natives. Unsatisfied with the price of the pelts, the lieutenant waved or tossed the pelt he was inspecting back at the chief. Apparently insulted, the chief left the vessel and later that night, a native woman came aboard the ship and warned the lieutenant that the Nuu-chah-nulth were planning to attack the ship the following day. Thorn failed to believe the woman until the next day when large numbers of native warriors were spotted on the coast. Since Thorn was unconvinced the Nuu-chah-nulth were hostile, a large canoe with over twenty native men was allowed to come to the ship to trade, and another canoe of some twenty men followed behind. The first twenty boarded with their weapons concealed under their clothing, pretending to trade furs and selling them cheaply. Thorn violated orders not to let very many natives onboard at once.

Lieutenant Thorn, happy with the prices he was getting for the furs, realized too late the danger the ship was in and gave the orders to hoist the anchor and sails. At this moment the Nuu-chah-nulth chief gave a signal to attack. Alexander McKay, James Lewis, Thorn and most of the crew were killed quickly since they were generally unarmed; Thorn had kept the guns below deck. The Nuu-chah-nulth were armed with clubs and knives. A few surviving crew members began to resist from below deck where the store of rifles and powder was located. The Nuu-chah-nulth withdrew to shore as night fell. Five men remained alive, one seriously injured. They debated the options but saw no possibility of sailing the ship with so few hands. They decided that four would leave in one of the ship's skiffs (a small open boat) under the cover of darkness and try to make it back to Fort Astoria along the coast.

The wounded man, possibly the ships armourer Weeks, stayed aboard the Tonquin. The Nuu-chah-nulth returned the next morning to plunder the ship. Once they were busy plundering, Weeks lit the ship's large black powder magazine. The massive explosion obliterated the ship, killing Weeks and many of the natives. The Nuu-chah-nulth acknowledged at least 100 dead and many more wounded, although other accounts say from sixty-one to over 200 natives were killed.

The four sailors in the skiff were pushed ashore by a storm further down the coast and captured by the Nuu-chah-nulth. In revenge for the explosion they were slowly tortured to death. Of the thirty crew of the Tonquin, only one man survived, a half Chinook pilot and interpreter, named Lemazee by Washington Irving, George Ramsey by others, and more recently identified as Joseachal. During the initial battle he gave himself over to a Nuu-chah-nulth woman begging to be made a slave. Joseachal/Joseeachfal was later redeemed and told his story to Gabriel Franchère.

In 2003, an anchor that, given its design, may be from the Tonquin, was salvaged in Templar Channel, just south of Tofino, Vancouver Island.

== See also ==
- American Indian Wars
- John R. Jewitt, whose ship, the Boston, was captured and the crew killed a few years before
