= Templers =

Templers may refer to:

- Templers, South Australia is a town in South Australia
- Templers (religious believers) are members of the Temple Society

== See also ==
- Instituts-Templers, a district of Lleida, Catalonia, Spain
- Templer, an English surname
- Templer (disambiguation)
