= USS Thorn =

USS Thorn has been the name of more than one United States Navy ship, and may refer to:

- USS Thorn (DD-505), a planned light destroyer; contract was cancelled, 1941
- USS Thorn (DD-647), a destroyer in commission from 1943 to 1946
- USS Thorn (DD-988), a destroyer in commission from 1980 to 2004

== See also ==
- USS Lady Thorne (SP-962), a patrol boat in commission from 1917 to 1918
