= Wickaninnish =

18th-century chief of the Tla-o-qui-aht people

Wickaninnish (/ˌwɪkəˈnɪnɪʃ/; meaning "Nobody sits or stands before him in the canoe") was a chief of the Tla-o-qui-aht people of Clayoquot Sound, on what is now Vancouver Island, British Columbia, Canada, in the 1780s and 1790s, during the opening period of European contact with the Pacific Northwest Coast cultures. His main name is also transliterated as Wickaninish, Wickananish, Wikinanish, Huiquinanichi, and Quiquinanis, and he was also known as Hiyoua.

Wickaninnish was a rival of the Mowachaht chief Maquinna of Nootka Sound, although the two were related both affinally and consanguineally. In one account he was blamed for the death of Maquinna's brother, Callicum, an event which spurred a war by the Mowachaht against the Tla-o-qui-aht. Maquinna's captive John R. Jewitt wrote of Wickaninnish.

In June 1811, Wickaninnish took umbrage at behaviour by the American merchant captain Jonathan Thorn, who was leading a voyage on the Pacific Fur Company's frigate Tonquin and had made overtures for trading. This resulted in the Battle of Woody Point, during which Tla-o-qui-aht warriors massacred Thorn and most of his crew. As the Tla-o-qui-aht plundered the Tonquin, a surviving crew member blew it up.

Places named for Wickaninnish include Wickaninnish Beach in Pacific Rim National Park Reserve, Wickaninnish Island, Wickaninnish Bay, and the Wickaninnish Inn, a surfside hotel, restaurant, and spa on Chesterman Beach, close to Long Beach.
