= Stevenson-class destroyer =

Cancelled ship class of WW2

Class overview
- Builders: Federal Shipbuilding and Drydock Company, Kearny, New Jersey (proposed)
- Operators: United States Navy (proposed)
- Built: ~1940
- Planned: 4
- On order: 4
- Canceled: 4

General characteristics
- Type: Light destroyer
- Displacement: 1,175 tons
- Length: 300 ft 0 in (91.44 m) waterline
- Beam: 34 ft 6 in (10.52 m)
- Draft: 9 ft 9 in (2.97 m)
- Speed: 24.5 knots (45.4 km/h; 28.2 mph)
- Range: 5,000 nmi (9,300 km; 5,800 mi) at 15 knots (28 km/h; 17 mph)
- Armament: 4 × 5-inch (127 mm)/38-caliber guns; 2 × quad 1.1-inch (28 mm) autocannon mount
- Notes: Data from final design

The Stevenson-class light destroyer was a planned series of four experimental light destroyers for the United States Navy. While the class was ultimately cancelled in 1941, the ships served as prototypes for American destroyer escorts.

== Development ==
By 1939, the US Navy realized the need for a new type of small escort ship that could be cheaply mass-produced. The initial requirements called for a ship simpler than a destroyer but more capable than a torpedo boat. To achieve this goal, two designs were submitted by Gibbs & Cox. Both plans proposed a fast and light destroyer while differing in displacement tonnage and armament. The largest design would have been equipped with two 5-inch (127 mm) dual-purpose guns, two quadruple-mounted 1.1-inch (28 mm) anti-aircraft guns, four machine guns, and six torpedo tubes in two triple mounts. The smaller proposal (at about 750 tons) called for two 3-inch (76 mm) dual purpose guns, one quadruple 1.1-inch anti-aircraft gun, four .50-caliber machine guns, and two triple torpedo tubes. Both designs could have achieved a top speed of 35 knots (65 km/h; 40 mph).

While the designs met the performance goals, they were a novel approach that deviated from the Navy's preference for a modernized and scaled-down version of an existing ship. Despite this, President Franklin Roosevelt ordered two ships of each design from Federal Shipbuilding in September 1940. Naval historian Norman Friedman speculates that Roosevelt's decision was influenced by advice from William Gibbs, head of Gibbs & Cox, and the president's personal enthusiasm for fast escorts.

== History ==
Each ship was ordered as a Gleaves-class destroyer after cancelation

The two ships of the smaller design were named Stevenson (DD-503) and Stockton (DD-504), while the larger duo were named Thorn (DD-505) and Turner (DD-506). Even before the ships were approved on 15 November 1940, issues began to arise. Problems with seakeeping and poor armament forced several redesigns, steadily enlarging the ships. The lack of anti-air weapons on Stevenson and Stockton forced their design to be completely abandoned, instead opting for the arrangements of Thorn and Turner. The final design was a ship that displaced 1,175 tons, had two additional 5-inch deck guns instead of torpedoes and a more practical top speed 24.5 knots (45.4 km/h; 28.2 mph).

By 1941, concerns about the financial practicality of the class compared to full-sized destroyers led to the project being abandoned and canceled on 10 February. Efforts were instead redirected toward developing a ship based on British experience in convoy escort during the Battle of the Atlantic, which eventually evolved into the destroyer escort. These ships met the initial description of the light destroyer while embodying the lessons learned from the design issues and modifications of the class.

On the same day of their cancellation, the four ships were re-ordered as the last Gleaves-class destroyers, becoming Stevenson (DD-645), Stockton (DD-646), Thorn (DD-647), and Turner (DD-648).
