= Templar (disambiguation) =

Templars, or Knights Templar, was a Medieval Catholic military order prominent in the Crusades.

Templar may also refer to:

- Templers (Pietist sect), a German Protestant sect

== Places ==
- Templar Channel, a channel in British Columbia, Canada, or the yacht for which it is named
- Templar House, a high-rise apartment building in Belfast, Northern Ireland
- Templars Square, a shopping complex in Cowley, Oxfordshire, England

== People with the name ==
- Templar Saxe (1865–1935), British-born actor and opera singer
- Henry George Templar (1904–1988), American politician, attorney and federal judge
- Len Templar (born 1931), Australian rules footballer
- Richard Templar, the pen name of a British author who has written several self-development books
- Templar of Tyre, the name of a medieval historian and of the document he wrote in the 14th century, the third section of the Gestes des Chiprois

== Arts, entertainment, and media ==
=== Fictional entities ===
- Templar (character class), a character class in Final Fantasy Tactics Advance
- Templar, a fictional country in the anime Kiba
- Templar, an assault OmniMech from the BattleTech franchise
- Simon Templar, a character in The Saint series of books and other media
- High Templars, and Dark Templars, units of the Protoss race in the RTS game StarCraft
- Templars (Hyperion Cantos), religious characters in Dan Simmons's Hyperion Cantos
- Templars or Abstergo Industries, the main antagonists of Assassin's Creed
- Templars of the Templar Order, a military order in Dragon Age

=== Music ===
- Templar (band), a Canadian alternative rock band
- The Templars (band), an American punk band
- "Templars", a song by Sabaton from the 2025 album Legends

=== Other uses in arts, entertainment, and media ===
- Templar, Arizona, a webcomic

== Other uses ==
- Templar, a genus of harvestmen in the family Monoscutidae
- HMS Templar (P316), a Royal Navy submarine
- Templar automobile, U.S. manufacturer of automobiles in the 1920s

== See also ==
- Knights Templar (disambiguation)
- Templer (disambiguation)
