= Templar Channel =

Coordinates: 49°07′50″N 125°55′11″W

Templar Channel is a channel in the Clayoquot Sound region of the west coast of Vancouver Island, British Columbia, Canada, lying between Lennard Island and Wickaninnish Island just northwest of the town of Tofino. An anchor was found in the channel that is possibly from the wreck of the Tonquin, an American trading ship that was destroyed in the area in 1811.

== Name origin ==
The channel was named in 1861 by Capt Richards of the Royal Navy after the yacht Templar or the Royal Thames Yacht Club. A 20-ton cutter, it was brought out to the Northwest Coast of North America on the deck of the barque Athelstan and was to make the first yachting trip around Vancouver Island, sailed by Lieut. Charles Edward Barrett-Lennard, the yacht's original owner, and another ex-military officer, Capt. Napoleon Fitzstubbs. Barrett-Lennard's account of the cruise, which lasted two and a half months, was published in 1862 as "Travels in British Columbia, including a yacht voyage around Vancouver Island". It was later sold to Messrs. Henderson and Burnaby of Victoria.

== Demise ==
On January 22, 1862, the Templar left Victoria on a trading cruise, but sought anchorage in Foul Bay (Gonzales Bay) in a heavy gale, and was lost.

== See also ==
- List of historical ships in British Columbia
- Templar (disambiguation)
