= Templer =

Templer is an English surname, and may refer to:

- Bernhard Templer (1865–1935), Austrian Jewish theologian
- Cherie Templer (1856–1915), New Zealand painter
- George Templer (1781–1843), builder of the Haytor Granite Tramway, Devon, England
- Field Marshal Sir Gerald (Walter Robert) Templer (1898-1979), British Army officer who fought in WWI and WWII
- James Templer (civil engineer) (1722–1782), a British civil engineer
- James Templer (canal builder) (1748–1813), builder of the Stover Canal, Devon, England
- James Templer (balloon aviator) (1846–1924), early British military pioneer of balloons
- John Charles Templer (1814–1874), British lawyer
- Karl Templer (fl. 1994–2009), British-born New York-based fashion stylist
- Pamela Templer, American ecosystem ecologist

== See also ==
- Templer (disambiguation)
- Templers (Pietist sect)
