= USS Morrison =

Fletcher-class destroyer

Coordinates: 27°10′N 127°58′E

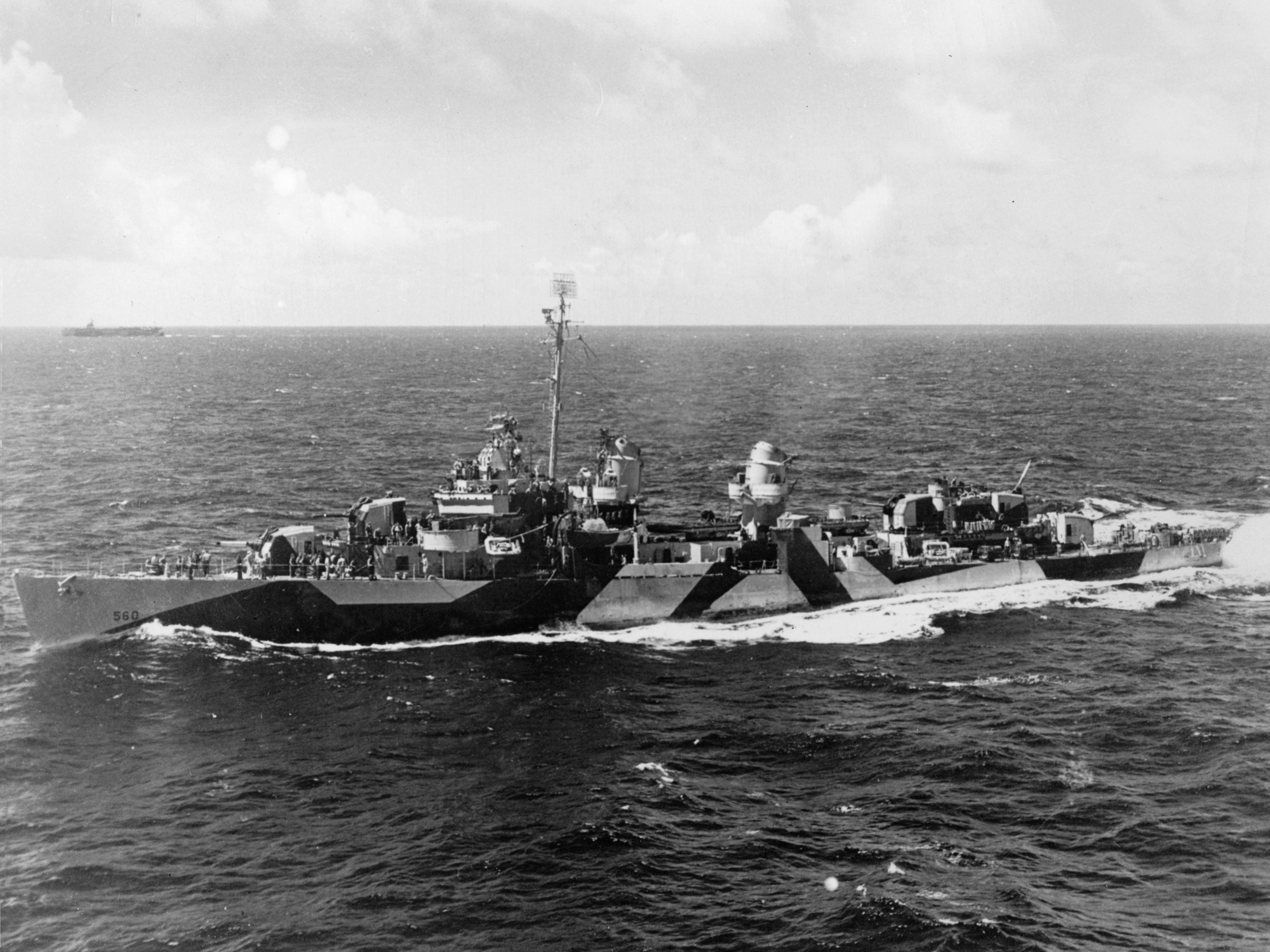
- USS Morrison (DD-560), viewed from Gambier Bay (CVE-73), 24 July 1944.

History

United States
- Name: Morrison
- Namesake: John G. Morrison
- Builder: Seattle-Tacoma Shipbuilding Corporation
- Laid down: 30 June 1942
- Launched: 4 July 1943
- Commissioned: 18 December 1943
- Fate: Sunk by kamikazes, 4 May 1945

General characteristics
- Class & type: Fletcher-class destroyer
- Displacement: 2,050 tons
- Length: 376 ft 6 in (114.7 m)
- Beam: 39 ft 8 in (12.1 m)
- Draft: 17 ft 9 in (5.4 m)
- Propulsion: 60,000 shp (45 MW); 2 propellers
- Speed: 35 knots (65 km/h; 40 mph)
- Range: 6500 nmi. (12,000 km) at 15 kt
- Complement: 273
- Armament: 5 × single Mk 12 5 in (127 mm)/38 guns; 5 × twin 40 mm (1.6 in) Bofors AA guns; 7 × single 20 mm (0.8 in) Oerlikon AA guns; 2 × quintuple 21 in (533 mm) torpedo tubes; 6 × single depth charge throwers; 2 × depth charge racks

USS Morrison (DD-560), a Fletcher-class destroyer, was a ship of the United States Navy, named for Coxswain John G. Morrison (1838–1897), who received the Medal of Honor for exceptional bravery during the Civil War.

== Construction and Commissioning ==
Morrison was laid down by the Seattle-Tacoma Shipbuilding Corp. of Seattle, Washington on 30 June 1942 and was launched on the 4th of July, 1943, sponsored by Miss Margaret M. Morrison, daughter of Coxswain Morrison. Morrison was commissioned into the U.S. Navy on 18 December 1943.

After shakedown off San Diego, California, Morrison departed Seattle 25 February 1944 for the South Pacific, via Pearl Harbor and the Marshalls. In mid-April the destroyer joined TG 50.17 for screening operations off Seeadler Harbor, Manus, Admiralties, during the fueling of carriers then striking Japanese installations in the Carolines.

== Central Pacific campaigns ==
Morrison returned to Pearl Harbor 9 May to train for the giant amphibious leap into the Marianas. Departing Pearl 31 May via Roi, Marshalls, she arrived east of Saipan 13 June for a busy month. Her accurate gunfire supported the initial landings on Saipan the 15th and provided close fire support thereafter. With little aid the crew fought off night air attacks 17 through 19 June. Of 40 enemy planes that approached at dusk the 17th, only 15 got by the attacks of the Navy's carrier interceptor planes; and Morrison shot down three of those.

On 2 August the destroyer rendezvoused off Guam with Task Group 58.4 (TG 58.4) for flight operations following the landings on Guam 21 July. Eight days later Morrison departed Guam for Eniwetok, Marshalls, where she remained from the 13th until she got underway 29 August for the Philippines, arriving off Mindanao the morning of 9 September. That same day, the beginning of a 2-day strike on Mindanao, a Japanese convoy of 50 sampans and freighters was sighted heading north. Morrison led the intercepting force which destroyed the 10 to 15 sampans that survived the strafing by planes. She pushed on for airstrike operations on Peleliu, Palau; the Carolines; and Luzon, Manila, and Samar Island, Philippines, through September.

On 2 October Morrison sailed with TG 38.3 for picket duty off Okinawa, during the airstrikes there and on other Islands in the Ryukyus 10 October. She continued on screen and plane guard operations off Formosa and northern Luzon during a 5-day attack beginning the 12th. On 16 October she screened Houston (CL-81) and Canberra (CA-70) as they retired to Ulithi.

== Philippines campaign ==
During the Battle for Leyte Gulf, 23 to 26 October, Morrison operated off Luzon. On the 24th, she came to the aid of Princeton (CVL-23), badly damaged by a Japanese bomb, and picked up approximately 400 survivors in an hour and a half. The destroyer then pulled alongside Princeton to assist in fighting fire; she had just reached her position when the small aircraft carrier, drifting and rolling, wedged Morrison's mast and forward stack between her uptakes. Morrison managed to get clear and Birmingham (CL-62) took her place. Ten minutes later the after third of Princeton blew off. Not only did Birmingham suffer topside damage and heavy casualties, but Princeton was then so badly damaged she had to be sunk by torpedoes.

Morrison debarked the Princeton survivors at Ulithi 27 October and got underway for the West Coast, via Pearl Harbor, in company with Irwin (DD-794) and Birmingham, arriving San Francisco, California, 17 November. On 9 February 1945 the destroyer steamed back to the South Pacific, stopping at Pearl Harbor on the 15th.

== Battle of Okinawa ==
After shore bombardment exercises in the Hawaiian Islands, Morrison departed for Ulithi 3 March. By 21 March she had joined Task Force 54 (TF 54) underway to support the invasion of Okinawa. The destroyer arrived off the southern shores of Okinawa on the 25th, 7 days before the landings 1 April, and joined in the preparations of bombardment.

In the early morning of 31 March she sank Japanese submarine I-8. After Stockton (DD-646) made a positive sound contact off Okinawa and expended her depth charges in the attack, Morrison arrived on the scene to see the submarine surface, then immediately submerge. She dropped a pattern of charges which seconds later forced the sub to the surface, where it was sunk by gunfire. At daylight Morrison's small boats rescued the lone survivor.

The ship continued shore bombardment, night illumination, and screen operations off Ōshima Beach. On the night of 11 April Morrison assisted Anthony (DD-515) in illuminating and sinking enemy landing craft heading north along the beach.

Three days later Morrison began radar picket duty. Her first two stations, southwest of Okinawa, were occasionally raided at night. She replaced Daly (DD-519) at the third station 28 April after the other destroyer was hit by a kamikaze.

On 30 April Morrison was shifted to the most critical station on the picket line. After 3 days of bad weather had prevented air raids, the dawn of 4 May was bright, clear, and ominous. At 07:15 the combat air patrol was called on to stop a force of about 25 planes headed toward Morrison, but some got through.

The first attack on Morrison, a main target as fighter-director ship, was a suicide run by a "Zeke". The plane broke through heavy flak to drop a bomb which splashed off the starboard beam and exploded harmlessly. Next a "Val" and another "Zeke" followed with unsuccessful suicide runs. About 08:25 a "Zeke" approached through intense antiaircraft fire to crash into a stack and the bridge. The blow inflicted heavy casualties and knocked out most of the electrical equipment. The next three planes, all old twin-float biplanes, maneuvered, despite heavy attack, to crash into the damaged ship. With the fourth hit, Morrison, heavily damaged, began to list sharply to starboard.

Few communication circuits remained intact enough to transmit the order to abandon ship. Two explosions occurred almost simultaneously, the bow lifted into the air, and by 08:40 Morrison had plunged beneath the surface. The ship sank so quickly that most men below decks were lost, a total of 152.

In July 1957 the sunken hull of Morrison was donated, along with those of some 26 other ships sunk in the Ryukyus area to the Government of the Ryukyu Islands for salvage.

Morrison received eight battle stars for World War II service.
