= Joseachal =

Joseachal was a Quinault man who lived in the early 19th century. Notably he was the sole survivor of the Tonquin, a trading vessel owned by the Pacific Fur Company (PFC) that was destroyed near Vancouver Island. He was hired to act an interpreter for the vessel in negotiations with various Nuu-chah-nulth peoples. Enraged at the prices that the Tla-o-qui-aht insisted upon, captain Jonathan Thorn struck an elder with a pelt. After purchasing PFC blades, the Tla-o-qui-aht attacked and killed the crew. Only Joseachal survived to reach Fort Astoria to inform the PFC officers of the Tonquin's destruction.

== Battle of Woody Point ==
Near Destruction Island he was recruited by Thorn to act as an interpreter. He had a sister married to a Tla-o-qui-aht man, a factor that has been attributed to his later survival on Vancouver Island. While at Clayoquot Sound in June 1811, the Tonquin hosted members of the neighboring Tla-o-qui-aht nation. They boarded the ship in large numbers to trade with commercial dealings negotiated between Thorn and an experienced elder, Nookamis, along with Joseachal translating their proposals. These discussions made Thorn increasingly frustrated at Nookamis' intransigence to accept his terms. Joseachal later informed Duncan McDougall that Thorn took one of Nookamis' fur skins and hit him in the face with it. After this outburst, the Indigenous consulted among themselves and offered to trade their fur stockpiles again. They proposed that in return for a skin, the PFC officers sell 3 blankets and a knife. McDougall recounted that "A brisk trade was carried on untill all the Indians setting round on the decks of the Ship were supplied with a knife a piece." Violence immediately erupted as the warriors led by Wickaninnish attacked the crew on board, and killed all but one of the men. The only known survivor of the crew was Joseachal, who arrived back at Fort Astoria through assistance of prominent Lower Chinookan noble Comcomly.

== Bibliography ==
- Jones, Robert F. (1997), "The Identity of the Tonquin's Interpreter", Oregon Historical Quarterly, 98 (3), Oregon Historical Society: 296–314
