= USS Thorn (DD-988) =

Spruance-class destroyer

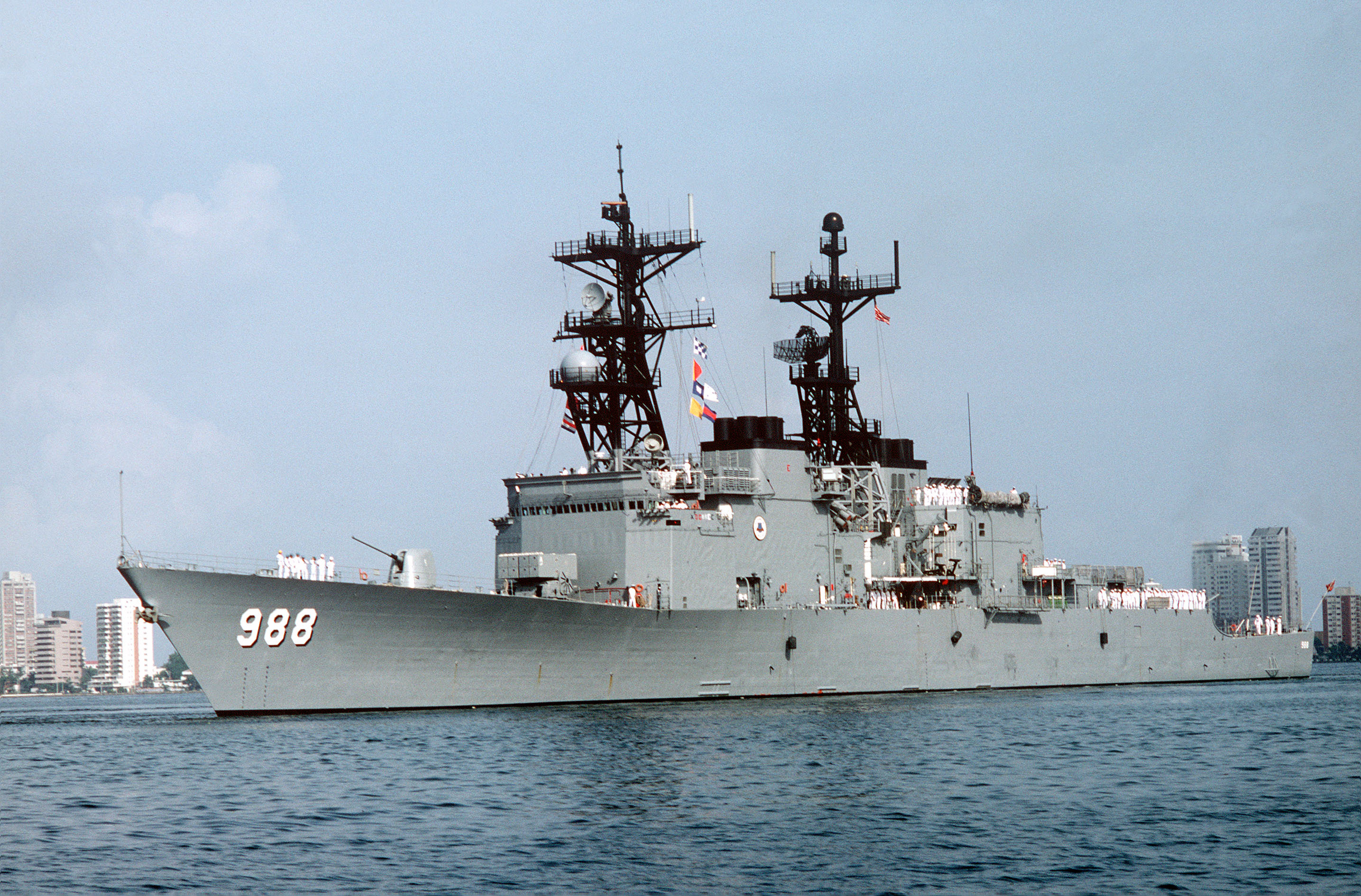
- USS Thorn in July 1984, Cartagena, Colombia

History

United States
- Name: Thorn
- Namesake: Jonathan Thorn
- Ordered: 15 January 1975
- Builder: Ingalls Shipbuilding
- Laid down: 29 August 1977
- Launched: 3 February 1979
- Acquired: 21 January 1980
- Commissioned: 16 February 1980
- Decommissioned: 25 August 2004
- Stricken: 25 August 2004
- Identification: Callsign: NOPQ; Hull number: DD-988
- Motto: Sharply Perseverant
- Fate: Sunk as target, 22 July 2006
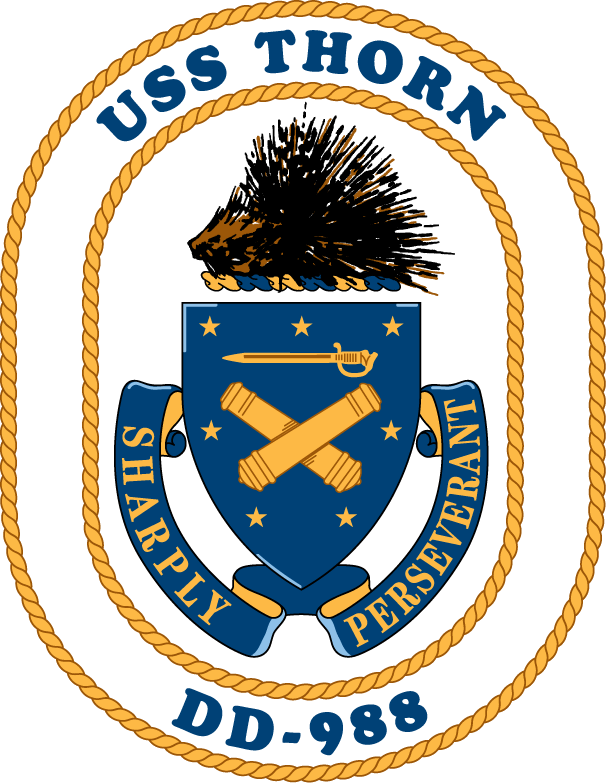
- Badge

General characteristics
- Class & type: Spruance-class destroyer
- Displacement: 8,040 long tons (8,170 t) full load
- Length: 529 ft (161 m) waterline; 563 ft (172 m) overall
- Beam: 55 ft (17 m)
- Draft: 29 ft (8.8 m)
- Installed power: 3 × 501-K17 generator sets (2,000 kW (2,700 hp) each)
- Propulsion: 4 × General Electric LM2500 gas turbines, 2 shafts, 80,000 shp (60 MW)
- Speed: 32.5 knots (60.2 km/h; 37.4 mph)
- Range: 6,000 nmi (11,000 km; 6,900 mi) at 20 knots (37 km/h; 23 mph)
- Complement: 19 officers, 315 enlisted
- Sensors & processing systems: AN/SPS-40 air search radar; AN/SPG-60 fire control radar; AN/SPS-55 surface search radar; AN/SPQ-9 gun fire control radar; Mark 23 TAS automatic detection and tracking radar; AN/SPS-65 missile fire control radar; AN/SQS-53 bow-mounted active sonar; AN/SQR-19 TACTAS towed array passive sonar; Naval Tactical Data System
- Electronic warfare & decoys: AN/SLQ-32 electronic warfare system; AN/SLQ-25 Nixie torpedo countermeasures; Mark 36 SRBOC decoy launching system; AN/SLQ-49 inflatable decoys
- Armament: 2 × 5 in (127 mm) 54 caliber Mark 45 dual purpose guns; 2 × 20 mm Phalanx CIWS Mark 15 guns; 1 × 8 cell ASROC launcher (removed); 1 × 8 cell NATO Sea Sparrow Mark 29 missile launcher; 2 × quadruple Harpoon missile canisters; 2 × Mark 32 triple 12.75 in (324 mm) torpedo tubes (Mk 46 torpedoes); 1 × 61 cell Mk 41 VLS launcher for Tomahawk missiles
- Aircraft carried: 2 × Sikorsky SH-60 Seahawk LAMPS III helicopters
- Aviation facilities: Flight deck and enclosed hangar for up to two medium-lift helicopters
- Extra armament: 1 × 21 cell RIM-116 Rolling Airframe Missile

USS Thorn (DD-988), a Spruance-class destroyer, was the second ship of the United States Navy to be named for Lieutenant Jonathan Thorn (1779–1811), who took part in Decatur's expedition to destroy the captured frigate Philadelphia in 1804.

== Construction and career ==
Thorn was laid down on 29 August 1977 by Ingalls Shipbuilding, Pascagoula, Miss.; launched on 22 November 1978 (Thorn was christened on 3 February 1979 by Mrs. Patricia Ansley); and commissioned on 16 February 1980.

Thorn was decommissioned and stricken from the Navy list on 25 August 2004.

Thorn was sunk as a test/target at 08:50 on 22 July 2006 off the United States East Coast.

== Gallery ==
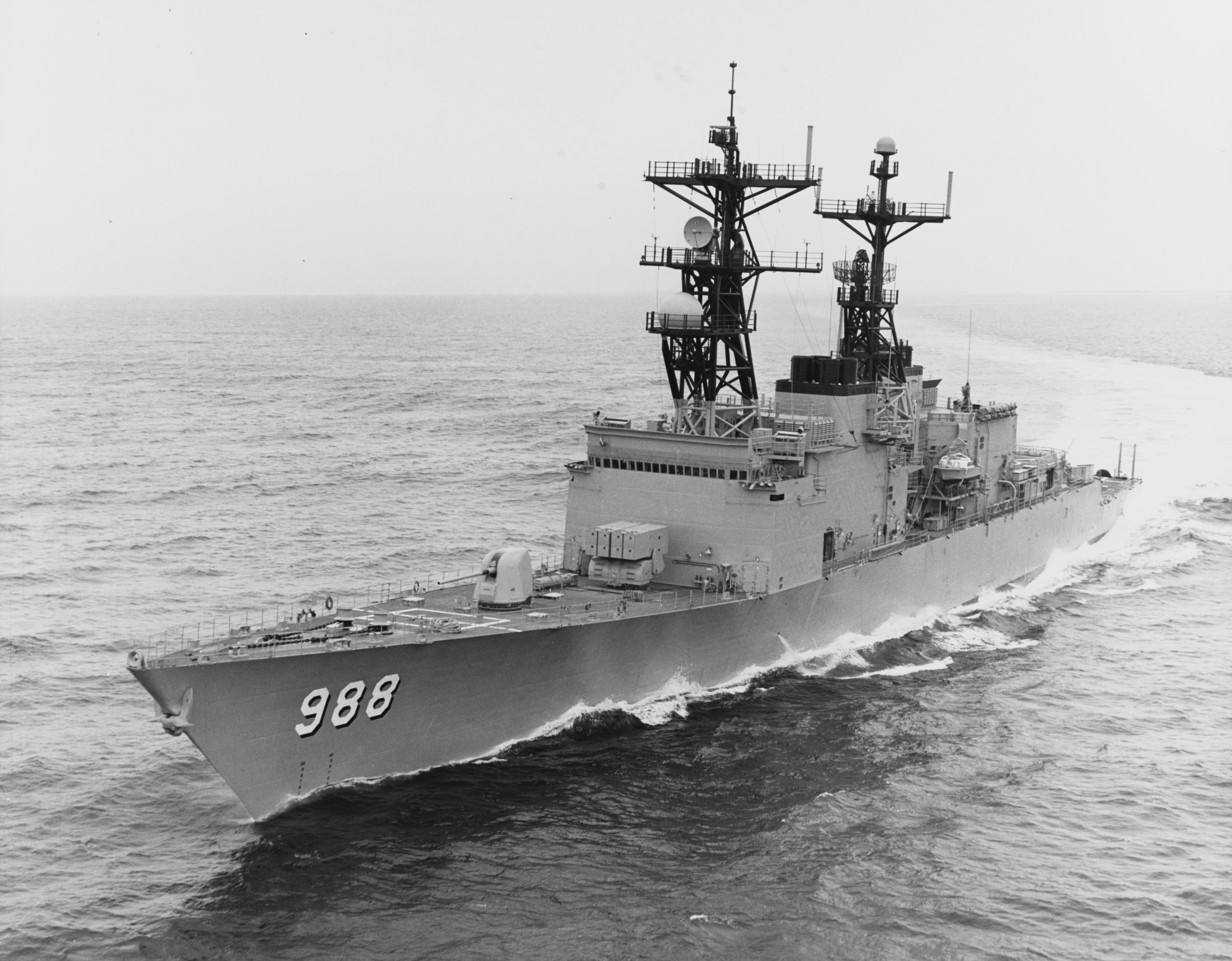
USS Thorn in the 1980s

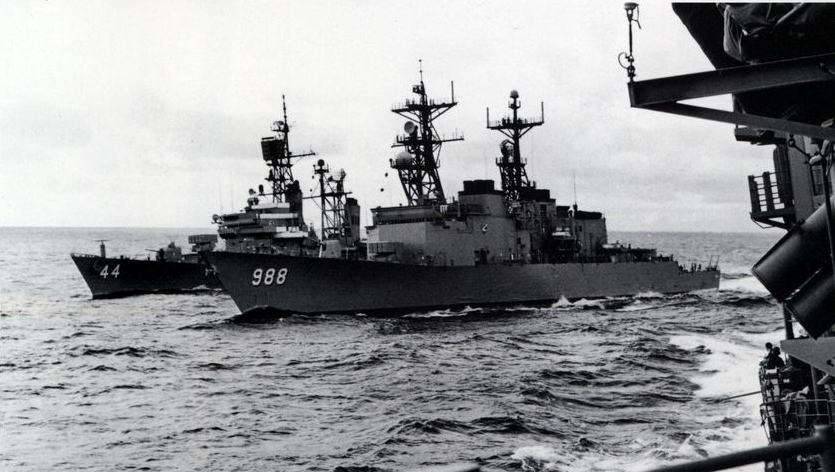
USS Thorn and USS William V. Pratt in the Atlantic Ocean in 1981

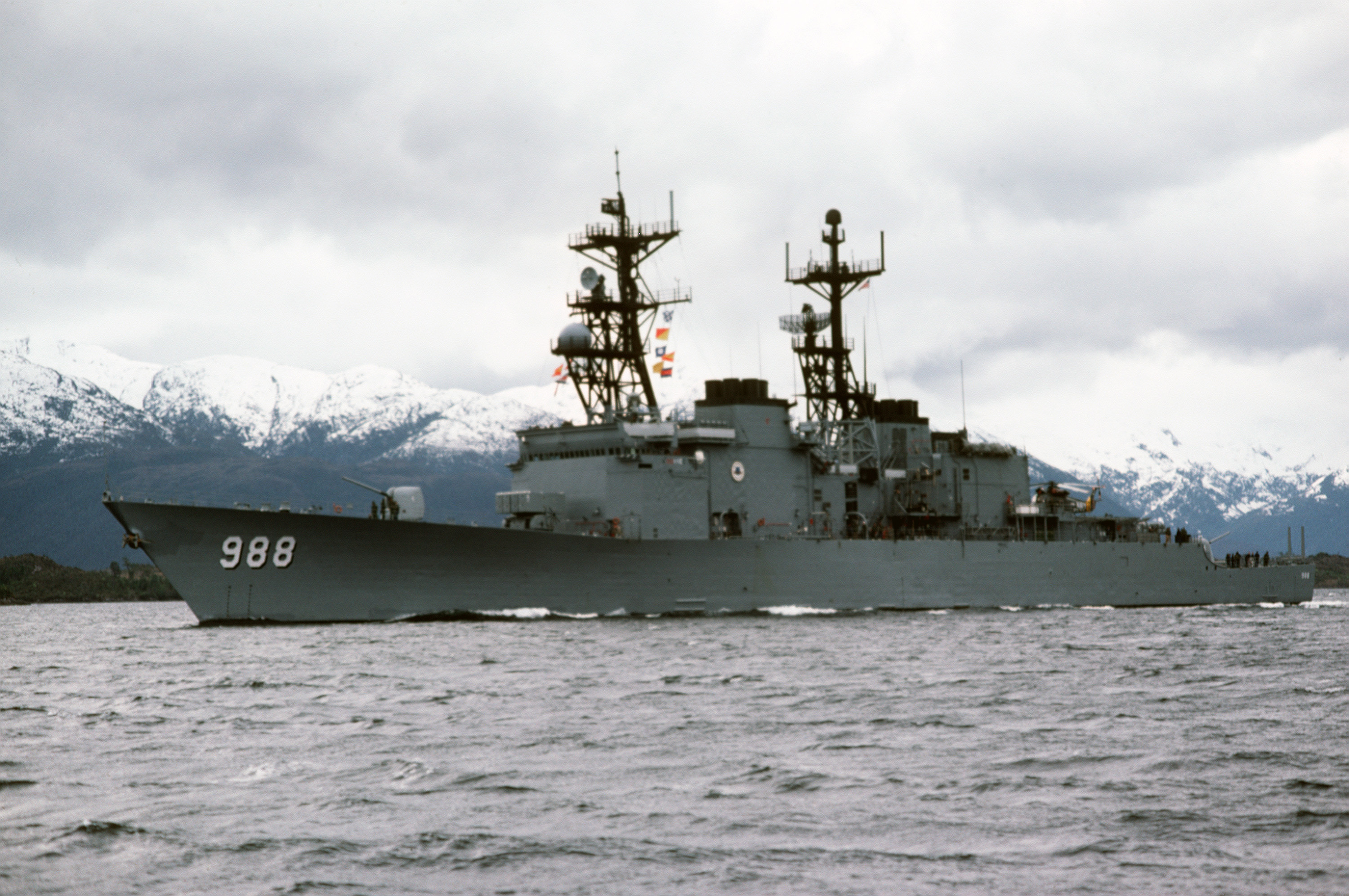
USS Thorn on 1 October 1984

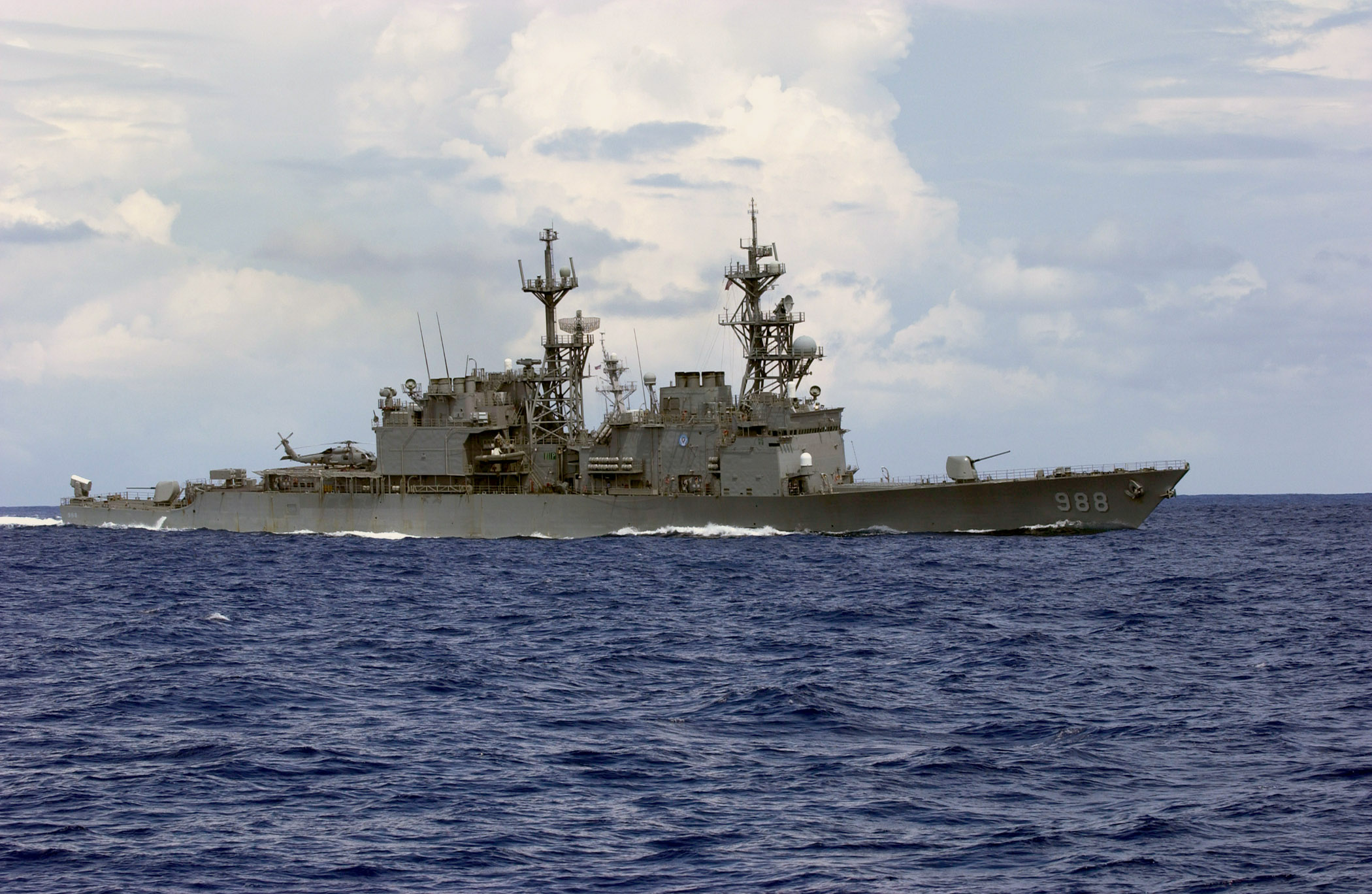
USS Thorn in the Atlantic Ocean on 5 September 2003

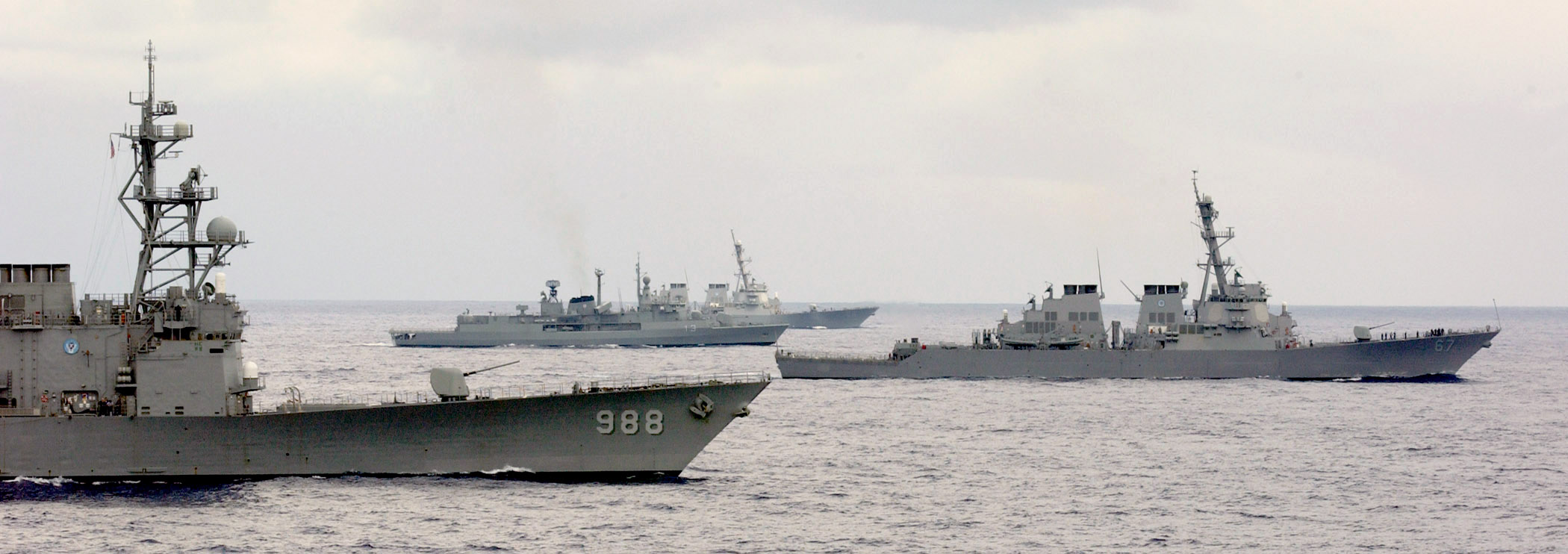
USS Thorn, USS Cole, ARA Sarandí and USS Gonzalez in the Atlantic Ocean on 5 September 2003
