= Knights Templar (disambiguation) =

The Knights Templar was a medieval Christian military order prominent in the Crusades, from the early 12th century until the early 14th century.

Knights Templar or Knight Templar may also refer to:

- Knights Templar (Freemasonry)
- The Knights Templar (Deus Ex), a fictional organization in the Deus Ex series
- Knight Templar (The Saint), a 1930 novel by Leslie Charteris
- The Knights Templar School, a school in Baldock, England
- Knights Templar Cartel, a drug cartel in Mexico
- Knight Templar, a Marvel Comics superhero in Marvel: The Lost Generation
- Arn: The Knight Templar, a Swedish film of 2007

== See also ==
- Anders Behring Breivik, a terrorist who claimed, apparently falsely, to be a member of a group called the Knights Templar
- Grand Masters of the Knights Templar
- History of the Knights Templar
- Knights Templar in popular culture
- List of Knights Templar
- List of Knights Templar sites
- Militia Templi, a present-day Catholic lay association.
- Royal Order of Scotland
- Sovereign Military Order of the Temple of Jerusalem, Ordo Supremus Militaris Templi Hierosolymitani Knights Templar International (OSMTH-KTI)
- Templar (disambiguation)
- Trials of the Knights Templar
