= John G. Morrison =

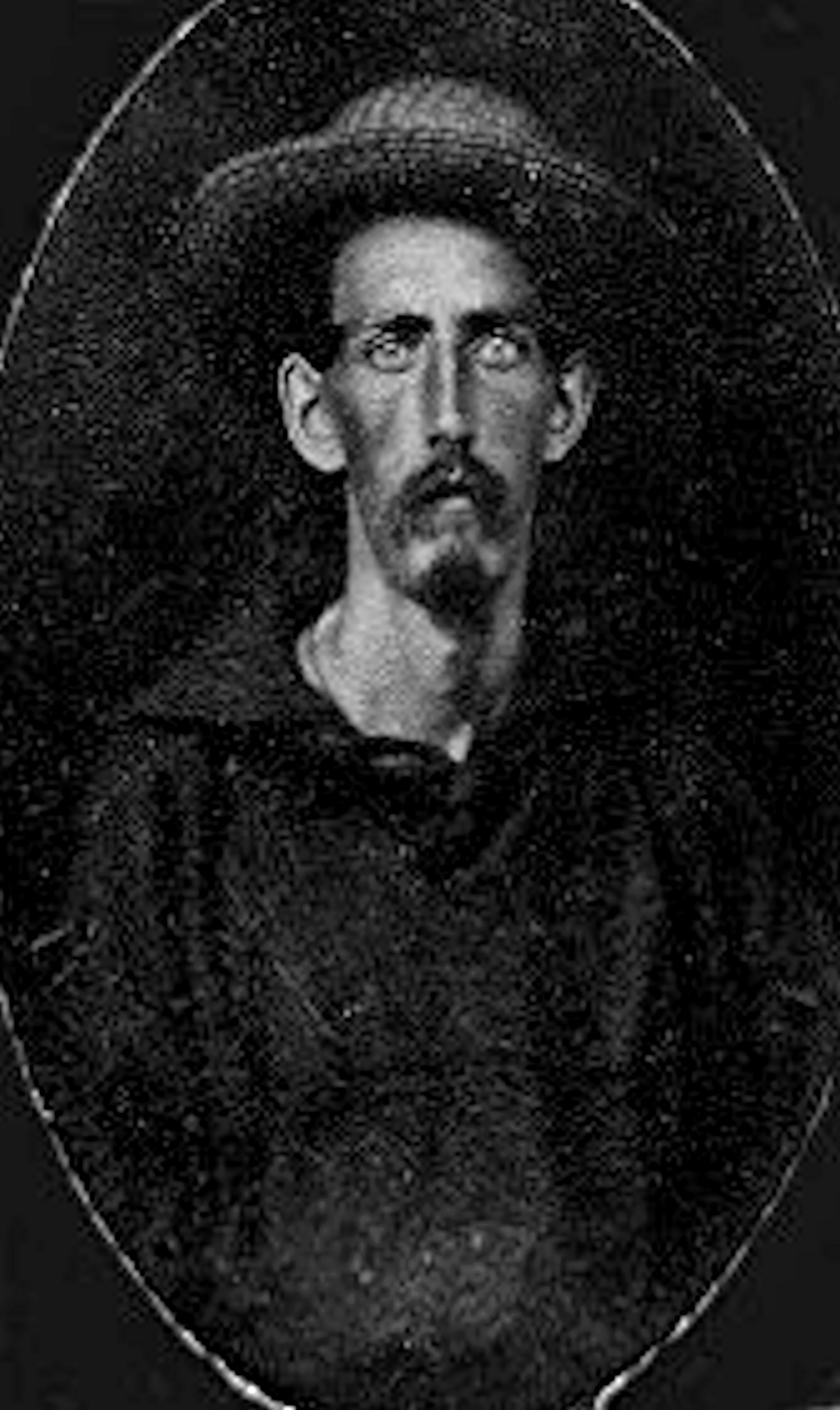
- Medal of Honor recipient
- Born: 13 July 1838; Ireland
- Died: 9 June 1897 (aged 58); New York City, US
- Burial place: Cypress Hills Cemetery, Brooklyn New York
- Military career
- Allegiance: United States of America; Union
- Branch: United States Navy; Union Navy; Union Army
- Service years: 1861-1865
- Rank: Coxswain
- Unit: (United States Navy) USS Carondelet
- Conflicts: American Civil War
- Awards: Medal of Honor

John Gordon Morrison (13 July 1838 – 9 June 1897) served in the American Civil War, receiving the Medal of Honor in 1862.

== Biography ==
Morrison was born in Ireland and came to the United States in 1855. Enlisting in the 30th New York Infantry at Lansingburgh, New York, 24 April 1861, he volunteered for service on gunboat USS Carondelet on 15 February 1862. He was appointed coxswain. He later received the Medal of Honor for exceptional bravery during an engagement on 15 July 1862, with Confederate ram CSS Arkansas in the Yazoo River. He was an inspiring example to the crew during Carondelet's unsuccessful attempt to halt the ironclad ram's progress through the Union blockade to the Mississippi River. . Coxswain Morrison was discharged from the Navy on 31 March 1863. In September 1864, he enlisted at Troy, New York in the 21st New York Cavalry Regiment, mustered in as a private, and mustered out in May 1865 at Bladensburg, Maryland.

== Medal of Honor citation ==

Rank and Organization: Rank and organization: Coxswain, U.S. Navy. Entered service at: Lansingburgh, N.Y. Born: 3 November 1842, Ireland G.O. No.: 59, 22 June 1865.

Citation:

Serving as coxswain on board the USS Carondelet, Morrison was commended for meritorious conduct in general and especially for his heroic conduct and his inspiring example to the crew in the engagement with the rebel ram Arkansas, Yazoo River, 15 July 1862. When the Carondelet was badly cut up, several of her crew killed, many wounded and others almost suffocated from the effects of escaped steam, Morrison was the leader when boarders were called on deck, and the first to return to the guns and give the ram a broadside as she passed. His presence of mind in time of battle or trial is reported as always conspicuous and encouraging.

== Later life ==
Morrison died in New York City on 9 June 1897.

He is buried in Cypress Hills Cemetery, Brooklyn, New York. His grave can be found in section 9, lot 359.

== Namesake ==
In 1943, the destroyer USS Morrison (DD-560) was named in his honor.

== See also ==
- List of Medal of Honor recipients
- List of American Civil War Medal of Honor recipients: M–P
