= USS Stevenson (DD-645) =

Gleaves-class destroyer

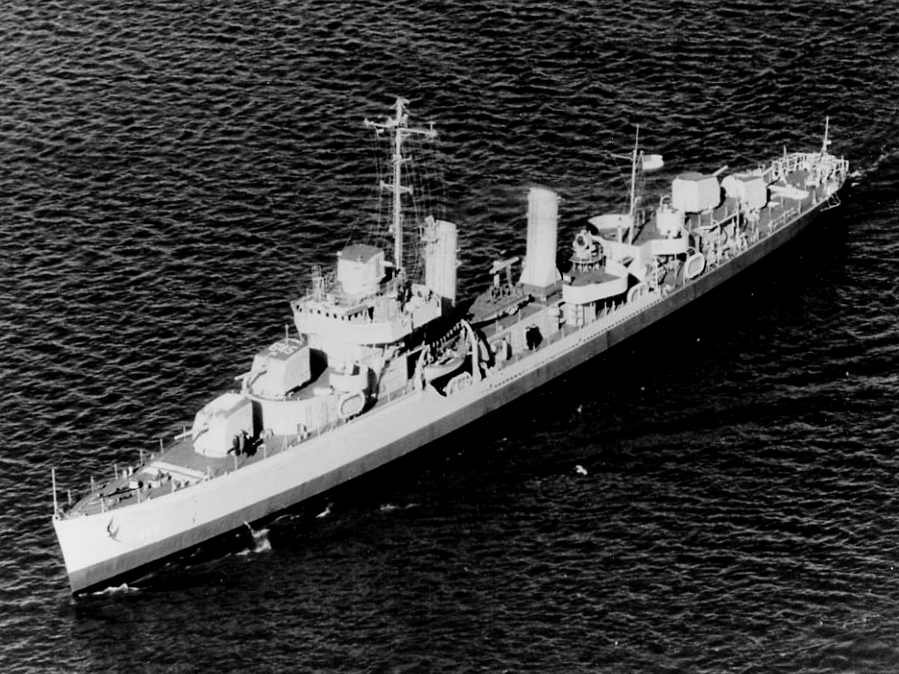
- USS Stevenson underway in December 1942.

History

United States
- Name: Stevenson
- Namesake: John H. Stevenson
- Builder: Federal Shipbuilding and Drydock Company
- Laid down: 23 July 1942
- Launched: 11 November 1942
- Commissioned: 15 December 1942
- Decommissioned: 27 April 1946
- Stricken: 1 June 1968
- Fate: Sold 2 June 1970 and broken up for scrap

General characteristics
- Class & type: Gleaves-class destroyer
- Displacement: 1,630 tons
- Length: 348 ft 3 in (106.15 m)
- Beam: 36 ft 1 in (11.00 m)
- Draft: 11 ft 10 in (3.61 m)
- Propulsion: 50,000 shp (37,000 kW); 4 boilers; 2 propellers
- Speed: 37.4 knots (69 km/h)
- Range: 6,500 nmi (12,000 km; 7,500 mi) at 12 kn (22 km/h; 14 mph)
- Complement: 16 officers, 260 enlisted
- Armament: 4 × 5 in (127 mm)/38 caliber DP guns; 4 × 40 mm (1.6 in) guns; 4 × 20 mm (0.79 in) AA guns, 5 × 21 in (533 mm) torpedo tubes (5 Mark 15 torpedoes); 6 × depth charge projectors, 2 × depth charge tracks

USS Stevenson (DD-645), was a Gleaves-class destroyer of the United States Navy.

== Namesake ==
John H. Stevenson was a native of New York City. He was appointed Volunteer Acting Assistant Paymaster and Clerk in the United States Navy on 19 September 1862 during the American Civil War.

While attached to USS Satellite on the Potomac in December 1862, he led a boat expedition ashore, captured a small party of Confederates, and destroyed signal and recruiting stations. In June 1863, while attached to USS Princess Royal on the West Gulf Blockading Squadron, he reconnoitered in and about an enemy camp. Learning the details of a plan to capture Fort Donaldsonville, Louisiana, he made plans that enabled the small fort and Princess Royal to beat off the attack. On 10 July 1863 when he volunteered to pick up dispatches from USS New London, aground under enemy fire, and carried them to David Farragut at New Orleans, a journey of some 85 miles (137 km) on horseback through enemy territory. He remained in the Navy after the war, serving in United States ports, the South Atlantic and Pacific stations, and at Nagasaki, Japan, until retiring with the grade of Pay Inspector on 25 September 1893. He was called back to active duty during the Spanish–American War and served as pay officer of the Coast Defense System. He died in Brooklyn, New York, on 14 June 1899.

The name Stevenson was assigned on 22 January 1941 to DD-503, an experimental 900-ton destroyer ordered on 9 September 1940 from the Federal Shipbuilding and Drydock Co., Kearny, N.J. However, the contract was cancelled on 10 February 1941 and replaced by a contract for the Gleaves-class destroyer.

== Construction and commissioning ==
Stevenson was laid down on 23 July 1942 by the Federal Shipbuilding and Drydock Co., Kearny, New Jersey and launched on 11 November 1942, sponsored by Miss Mary Stevenson, daughter of Pay Inspector Stevenson. The ship was commissioned on 15 December 1942.

== Service history ==
Stevenson commenced shakedown in late December immediately after commissioning, but, on 4 February 1943, she collided with SS Berwind Vale off Newport, Rhode Island, losing part of her bow. After repairs at the Brooklyn Navy Yard, she escorted five merchant convoys between the U.S. east coast and North African ports. During that period, March through December 1943, she made several attacks on suspected submarine contacts, but none resulted in a confirmed kill.

On 23 January 1944, Stevenson left Norfolk to join the U.S. 7th Fleet in the Southwest Pacific. Shortly after arriving, she saw her first action, providing gunfire support for the landings on Los Negros Island in the Admiralties on 29 February 1944. For the next five months she took part in the leap-frogging assaults along the New Guinea coast, participating in the landings in Humboldt Bay in April, at Wakde in May, and at Sansapor and Noemfoor in July. On 20 August, Stevenson departed New Guinea to join the Palau Islands invasion force. She was employed during the landings as a unit of the transport screen, both en route and at the objective. Upon completion of the Palau operations, she sailed on 14 October for Seattle, Washington, for overhaul.

Refresher training lasted until 27 January 1945, when she left Pearl Harbor for Ulithi. From February to August 1945, Stevenson escorted the replenishment units of the Logistics Support Group, which supported the fast carrier forces during the Iwo Jima and Okinawa operations and the air strikes on the Japanese homeland. On 5 June, she weathered a typhoon; by the end of the war, she was operating within 200 miles (370 km) of the Japanese coast to support Admiral William F. Halsey's carriers. After brief occupation duty, during which she rode out Typhoon Louise in Japan between 9–11 October, the destroyer sailed for home via Singapore and Cape Town. She arrived in Charleston, South Carolina, on 20 January 1946, where she was decommissioned on 27 April 1946 and placed in reserve. She was struck from the Navy list on 1 June 1968.

Stevenson earned seven battle stars for her World War II service.
