= Bernhard Templer =

Late 19th/early 20th century Jewish Western European Theologian

Rabbi Bernhard Templer

Personal life
- Born: 1 May 1865 Briegel, Austrian Galicia
- Died: 22 August 1935 (aged 70) Republic of Baden
- Education: University of Vienna; Hochschule für die Wissenschaft des Judentums

Religious life
- Religion: Judaism

Bernhard Templer (Hebrew: ר׳ דב בריש ב״ר מרדכי טמפלר, romanized: Dov Berish ben Mordekhai Templer; May 1, 1865 – August 22, 1935) was a Austro-Galician Jewish theologian.

== Biography ==
Templer was born in Briegel, Galicia (now Brzesko, Poland) to Rabbi Marcus Templer. At the age of fifteen he began contributing articles to various Hebrew periodicals, and two years later he published his Dover tov (Lemberg, 1882), novellæ and commentaries on obscure Talmudic passages. He was educated at the University of Vienna, the Vienna Bet ha-Midrash, and at the Hochschule für die Wissenschaft des Judentums in Berlin, where he received rabbinical ordination at the age of 18.

Templer went on to work as a rabbi in Mährisch Aussee, Mährisch Schönberg, and Vienna. He served as a military rabbi during World War I.

== Publications ==
- Dover tov (in Hebrew). Lemberg. 1882.
- Pekuddat ha-tzaddikim (in Hebrew). Krakow: Fischer & Deutscher. 1883. Comments on Biblical passages.
- Die Unsterblichkeitslehre (Psychologie, Messianologie und Eschatologie) bei den Jüdischen Philosophen des Mittelalters (in German). Leipzig: Breitenstein. 1895.
- Assimilation oder Organisation (in German). Vienna: B. Templer. 1899.
- Zeit zu sprechen! Predigt gehalten am Schemini Azereth 5660 (26. September 1899) (in German). Vienna: B. Templer. 1899.
- Israels Wehr. Predigt gehalten am Sabbath-Chanukah 5665 (10. Dezember 1904) im Tempel des Bethausvereines im III. Bezirk in Wieng des verfassers (in German). Vienna: B. Templer. 1904.
- Ein antikes Seitenstück, zum modernen Parteiwesen im Judentum (in German). 1906.
- Der Unsterblichkeitsglaube und die Bibel. Sozialpolitische Studie (in German). Vienna: M. Breitenstein. 1909.
- Israels Leiden und Freuden. Zwei Predigtengehalten am Neujahrstage und Schemini Azereth 5680 (1919) (in German). Vienna: B. Templer. 1919.
- Grammatik der hebräischen Sprache für den Selbstunterricht (in German) (4th ed.). Vienna: A. Hartleben. 1922.
- Die Entstehungsgeschichte des Opferkultus im Mosaismus. Apologetik des Alten Testaments (in German). Vienna: A. Hartleben. 1926.
- Weg der jüdischen Frau zur Frauenemanzipation. Eine kulturgeschichtliche Studie (in German). Vienna: H. Glanz. 1937.
