= Pamela Templer =

Ecosystem ecologist

Pamela H. Templer
- Education: Ph.D. Cornell University; B.A. University of California, Santa Cruz
- Awards: Metcalf Award, Boston University; NSF CAREER Grant
- Scientific career
- Fields: ecosystem ecology, biogeochemistry, global change
- Website: http://people.bu.edu/ptempler/index.html

Pamela H. Templer is an ecosystem ecologist and professor at Boston University who focuses on plant-microbial interaction and their effect on carbon exchange and nutrient cycling. She is also interested in examining how urban ecosystems function, how human actions influence nutrient cycling, atmosphere-biosphere interactions, and other ecosystem processes.

== Early life and education ==
Templer was born and raised in Los Angeles, California. She attended Grover Cleveland Humanities Magnet High School. In college, she was a music major at the University of California, Santa Cruz. Templer soon realized that she did not want to pursue a career in music and when looking into other fields, she spent a semester in a "Natural History of California" class, where she backpacked through California, while learning about ecosystem management. This class sparked her interest in ecology and led her to spend the summer class at the Cary Institute of Ecosystem Studies (New York), where she learned how to conduct research. She later went to Costa Rica for a semester to study tropical biology, this helped her narrow-down her field of study. Templer went on to earn her PhD from Cornell University under the direction of Todd Dawson (currently a professor at University of California Berkeley).

== Career and research ==
Templer is an ecosystem ecologist and full professor of biology at Boston University, who examines the influence that plant-microbial interactions have on nutrient cycling. Templer and her lab group also investigate how ecosystem disturbance such as, urbanization, air pollution, climate change, have on biosphere-atmosphere-soil interactions. Templer currently examines a variety of nutrient sources such as fog, rain, and atmospheric deposition within forest ecosystems, she also study plant-microbial interactions and their effect on carbon and nitrogen loss and retention within natural and managed ecosystems.

Templer and her lab work around the world, investigating different disturbances on terrestrial ecosystems in different places. These include: temperate forest in the northeast of the United States, tropical forests in Mexico, and urban areas throughout the Greater Boston Area. Much of Templer's work investigating how forests are and will respond to warming and other chronic disturbances takes place at Hubbard Brook Experimental Forest, a long term ecological research site in the White Mountains of New Hampshire. Templer specifically looks at a changing climate in the White Mountains and tries create conditions that the forest may experience within the next century by heating the soil using space heaters and clearing off snow. Under warming conditions there is less snow so soils actually get colder (snow acts as a blanket for soils, insulating them in the winter), leading to freezing of the soil microbe community and changing the way carbon and nutrients are cycled in the forest floor. For example, along with Anne Socci, she found that a smaller snowpack leads to greater soil frost, reducing nitrogen uptake rates in sugar maple trees. Templer also examines how reactive nitrogen in atmospheric deposition varies spatially across forest ecosystems in the northeast with colleague Kathleen Weathers

In addition to her terrestrial biogeochemistry lab, Templer also co-directs the Stable Isotope Lab at Boston University. This fee-for-hire lab also serves to train students in application of stable isotopes to ecology. The stable isotope lab measures on light isotopes, including nitrogen, carbon, hydrogen, oxygen and sulfur. Stable isotopes of these critical elements can help scientists unravel the multiple ecosystem processes that always occur in concert. For example, stable isotopes can be used to determine food web structure and metabolic pathways or determine sources of an element to any given pool (such as different sources of reactive nitrogen).

Templer has written or contributed to over 130 peer-reviewed articles and cited over 4700 times . Her most cited work utilizes stable isotopes (in particular nitrogen) to examine how ecosystems respond to changing climate and other human disturbances.

== Teaching and outreach ==
Templer teaches classes in the Department of Biology at Boston University across a range of topics, including Ecology, Biology of Global Change, Forest Ecology, and Terrestrial Biogeosciences. Templer was praised as a "champion of participatory learning," by often exposing her students to field research when awarded the Metcalf Award from Boston University in 2015. Templer is the Director of the Ph.D. Program in Biogeoscience, Director of the NSF funded Research Traineeship BU URBAN Graduate Program.

Templer has appeared on multiple media outlets discussing her research specifically as well as ecosystems and climate change in general from Scientific American and the Boston Globe to appearing on WBUR's morning edition.

== Awards and honors ==
- Metcalf Award from Boston University in 2015. This award is to recognize outstanding professors at BU, and the award is selected for a professor out of the whole BU community.
- National Science Foundation CAREER grant (2012-2017)
- Elected member of Scientific Coordinating Committee, Hubbard Brook Experimental Forest (2010-2019)
- Elected Fellow of Ecological Society of America (2019)
