= USS Thorn (DD-647) =

Gleaves-class destroyer

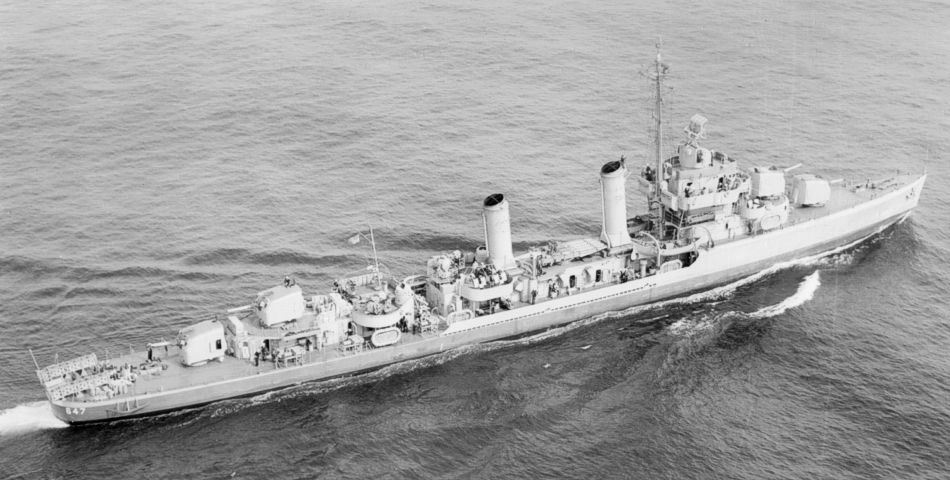
- USS Thorn (DD-647) underway c1943.

History

United States
- Name: Thorn
- Namesake: Jonathan Thorn
- Builder: Federal Shipbuilding and Drydock Company
- Laid down: 15 November 1942
- Launched: 28 February 1943
- Commissioned: 1 April 1943
- Decommissioned: 6 May 1946
- Stricken: 1 July 1971
- Fate: Sunk as target, 22 August 1974

General characteristics
- Class & type: Gleaves-class destroyer
- Displacement: 1,630 tons (standard)
- Length: 348 ft 3 in (106.15 m)
- Beam: 36 ft 1 in (11.00 m)
- Draft: 11 ft 10 in (3.61 m)
- Propulsion: 50,000 shp (37,000 kW); 4 boilers; 2 propellers
- Speed: 37.4 knots (69 km/h)
- Range: 6,500 nmi (12,000 km; 7,500 mi) at 12 kn (22 km/h; 14 mph)
- Complement: 16 officers, 260 enlisted
- Armament: 4 × 5 in (127 mm)/38 caliber DP guns; 4 × 40 mm (1.6 in) guns; 5 × 20 mm (0.79 in) AA guns, 5 × 21 in (533 mm) torpedo tubes (5 Mark 15 torpedoes); 6 × depth charge projectors, 2 × depth charge tracks

USS Thorn (DD-647), a Gleaves-class destroyer, was the first ship of the United States Navy to be named for Jonathan Thorn.

Thorn was laid down on 15 November 1942 at Kearny, New Jersey, by the Federal Shipbuilding and Drydock Co.; sponsored by Mrs. Beatrice Fox Palmer and launched on 28 February 1943. The ship was commissioned on 1 April 1943 at the Brooklyn Navy Yard.

== Service history ==
=== Atlantic service, May 1943 – January 1944 ===
Following shakedown and trials out of Casco Bay, Maine, Thorn joined Destroyer Squadron 19 (DesRon 19). Between 28 May 1943 and 2 January 1944, the destroyer conducted four round-trip convoy escort mission signs on the New York–Norfolk–Casablanca route — the first trip as part of Task Force 69 (TF69) and the other three as part of TF64. On her last convoy run, she escorted two oilers to Ponta Delgada, in the Azores, in company with Stockton — the first ships to enter the port under the terms of the new agreement between the Allies and the government of Portugal.

On 3 January 1944, the day after Thorn arrived back in New York Harbor, Turner blew up and sank in Ambrose Channel, 5,000 yards (4,600 m) astern of Thorn. Calling away the ship's motor whaleboat, Thorn sent: a rescue party to try to recover survivors. Lt. James P. Drake, USNR, and Boatswain's Mate, First Class, E. Wells were awarded Navy and Marine Corps Medals for their bravery in the rescue of three Turner survivors, and three other men received commendation bars for their part in the operation.

=== Southwest Pacific service, February – September 1944 ===
Late in January, Thorn sailed for the Pacific and transited the Panama Canal on 29 January. Ordered to report to relieve DesRon 1 in New Guinea waters, the destroyer and her sisters of Destroyer Division 37 (DesDiv 37) headed for the southwest Pacific. Thorn was detoured to Guadalcanal and Rendova Islands to escort a detached oiler group. She finally arrived at Milne Bay, New Guinea, on 29 February.

Thorn moved directly from there to Cape Sudest where, on 4 March, the destroyer embarked troops and supplies of the Army's 7th Cavalry and immediately proceeded to Los Negros Island for the invasion of the Admiralties. In addition to making three additional escort trips between Cape Sudest and Seeadler Harbor, Thorn participated in two shore bombardments of Pityilu Island, conducted antisubmarine patrols north of the Admiralties, and acted as a fighter director vessel.

On 10 April — while making a practice torpedo run during preparations for forthcoming Allied landings at Hollandia — Thorn struck an uncharted reef. Damage to her screws and shafts forced the ship back to the West Coast for an overhaul. En route home, she escorted the battleship Massachusetts to Bremerton, Washington. She subsequently escorted the escort carrier Thetis Bay from the Puget Sound Navy Yard to San Francisco, California, where she eventually arrived on 22 May.

After completing her overhaul at the Hunter's Point Navy Yard, Thorn conducted refresher training and then escorted the battleship Mississippi to Hawaii. She arrived at Pearl Harbor on 11 August. She then escorted the battleship Maryland to Purvis Bay, Solomon Islands, where she joined escort carrier Task Unit 32.7.1 (TU 32.7.1) and proceeded to the Palaus for the landings on 15 September. During this deployment as screen and plane guard, Thorn rescued the crews of three Grumman TBM Avenger torpedo bombers which had "ditched."

=== Philippines service, October – December 1944 ===
Detached from escort duty at the end of September, Thorn joined the U.S. Seventh Fleet at Manus Island, in the Admiralties, on 3 October. As American forces massed for the initial assaults on the Japanese-occupied Philippine Islands, Thorn joined the fire support screen for TF 77. She entered Leyte Gulf on the night of 18 October and screened battleships and cruisers during their early shore bombardments.

As Allied troops swarmed ashore two days later, the destroyer provided interdiction fire at Abuyog, south of the Leyte beaches, and patrolled the southern end of Leyte Gulf for the following week. At dawn on 21 October, Thorn's gunners opened fire on a Japanese Aichi D3A and sent the enemy dive bomber splashing into the sea near the transport area. On 22 October, the destroyer and the cruiser Portland splashed another enemy aircraft.

During the fierce night action at Surigao Strait, Thorn screened the American battleships as they mauled the Japanese force coming through the strait. Originally ordered to conduct a torpedo attack on the Japanese battle line, Thorn and her mates were recalled as the Japanese retreated back south through Surigao Strait. She then formed up with the lefthand flank of cruisers and destroyers and headed south to polish off the cripples from the Japanese force. The American ships came across one Japanese destroyer and smothered it with fire which summarily dispatched it to the depths. During her 17 salvoes, Thorn observed 12 hits.

On the evening of 25 October, Thorn's division received orders to lie-to off Homonhon Island, on the east side of Leyte Gulf, to conduct a torpedo attack on a Japanese force expected from the eastward. The enemy, however, had already retired into the San Bernardino Strait that afternoon, and the American destroyer unit was recalled on the 26th.

Ordered to Ulithi, Thorn departed Philippine waters to rejoin the U.S. Third Fleet in the Carolines, for duty with the Fast Carrier Task Force (then designated TF38). From 6 to 24 November Thorn participated in TF 38's strikes against Japanese targets in the Philippines, screening and planeguarding for the fast carriers. She returned to Ulithi with TG 30.8 for duty with a logistics support group. She subsequently resumed planeguarding, this time standing by escort carriers. She assisted Cape Esperance during Typhoon Cobra on 18 December. Following this heavy storm — which sank three destroyers — Thorn searched for survivors in the storm area.

=== Off Japan, January – October 1945 ===
During the carrier strikes on Lingayen in early January 1945 and the subsequent carrier raids on Japanese shipping in the South China Sea, Thorn escorted a fast oiler group for replenishment evolutions with the aircraft carriers. While returning to the Carolines, via Leyte Gulf and the Mindoro Strait, Thorn rescued the crew of a downed TBM and the pilot of a crashed fighter before arriving at Ulithi on 27 January. The destroyer again screened oilers during the operations against Iwo Jima and also entered waters near the strategic island to screen heavy fire support units. On 21 February, Thorn and Ute learned that the escort carrier Bismarck Sea had been struck by two Japanese kamikazes, and they rushed to aid the stricken ship. However, when they searched the scene the escort carrier had already gone to the bottom.

Two days in Ulithi followed the ship's return, and, on 13 March, Thorn reformed with the U.S. 5th Fleet support group built around the cruiser Detroit for the Ryūkyū operations. On 25 March, Thorn and Aylwin made depth charge attacks on a sonar contact and observed an oil slick after the last drop. They conducted a retirement search before rejoining the formation on 26 March, but could not verify that the contact had actually been a submarine.

Thorn subsequently conducted four escort missions with the replenishment group, escorting oilers into Kerama Retto to fuel the fire support ships off Okinawa and making her first run on 1 April. On the second run, Thorn observed two enemy planes splashing into the sea, victims of combat air patrol (CAP) fighters and ship gunfire. On the third, a kamikaze hit Taluga, two miles (3.7 km) astern, while another enemy kamikaze splashed alongside a nearby small patrol craft.

The destroyer then spent two weeks at Ulithi, replenishing for further operations with the logistics support group. She rejoined the oilers and supply ships at sea on 28 May. On 5 June, Thorn rode out her second major typhoon, steaming through the eye of the storm at 05:30. Two days later, she joined a group of four damaged escort aircraft carriers which were retiring to Guam.

On 4 July, soon after screening the CVEs out of the "front lines" for repairs, Thorn resumed work with the replenishment and support group and continued screening and supporting it through the surrender of Japan. During this period, she sank seven drifting mines.

Following Japan's surrender, Thorn steamed off Tokyo Bay until 9 September, when the entire group entered Sagami Wan. The next day, the support group's base was established at the Yokosuka Naval Base, where Thorn remained through the end of September.

Streaming her homeward-bound pennant, Thorn, in company with DesRon 19, steamed out of Tokyo Bay on 8 October and joined the battleships Tennessee and California off Wakayama the following day. On 15 October, the group sailed on the first leg of their homeward bound voyage, subsequently stopping at Singapore, Colombo, and Cape Town. The destroyer eventually arrived in New York on 7 December 1945, via St. Helena and Ascension Islands in the Atlantic. After a month's overhaul, she proceeded to Charleston, South Carolina, where she was decommissioned and placed in reserve on 6 May 1946.

=== Reserve and disposal ===
Thorn being sunk in 1974.

Thorn lay in reserve through the late 1940s, 1950s, and 1960s. Struck from the Navy list on 1 July 1971, the ship's hulk was authorized for use as a target and was sunk by aircraft from the aircraft carrier Saratoga on 22 August 1974, approximately 75 miles (140 km) east of Jacksonville, Florida. Several veterans of Thorn were invited to observe the SinkEx, including George D. Bailey, who had worked on Thorn's construction before enlisting in the Navy, and then served in her throughout the war; he observed, "I was at the birth and death of the old 647."

Thorn received seven battle stars for her World War II service.
