= Templer (disambiguation) =

Templer is an English surname.

Templer may also refer to:

- Detective Chief Superintendent Gill Templer, a character in the TV series Inspector Rebus
- RMAS Colonel Templer (A229), an acoustic research vessel of the Royal Maritime Auxiliary Service
- Templer Medal, awarded by the Society for Army Historical Research, United Kingdom
- Templer Park, a forest reserve in Rawang, Malaysia
- Gerald Templer, a British army officer

== See also ==
- Templers (Pietist sect)
- Templar (disambiguation)
- Templer, an English surname
