= USS Stockton (DD-646) =

Gleaves-class destroyer

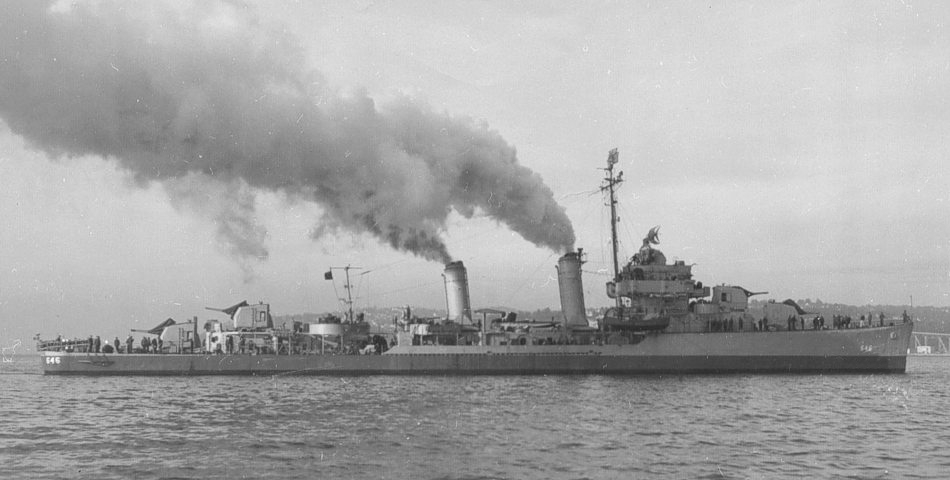
- USS Stockton (DD-646) broadside view c1943.

History

United States
- Name: Stockton
- Namesake: Robert F. Stockton
- Builder: Federal Shipbuilding and Drydock Company
- Laid down: 24 July 1942
- Launched: 11 November 1942
- Commissioned: 11 January 1943
- Decommissioned: 16 May 1946
- Stricken: 1 July 1971
- Fate: Sold 25 May 1973 and broken up for scrap

General characteristics
- Class & type: Gleaves-class destroyer
- Displacement: 1,630 tons (standard)
- Length: 348 ft 3 in (106.15 m)
- Beam: 36 ft 1 in (11.00 m)
- Draft: 11 ft 10 in (3.61 m)
- Propulsion: 50,000 shp (37,000 kW); 4 boilers; 2 propellers
- Speed: 37.4 knots (69 km/h)
- Range: 6,500 nmi (12,000 km; 7,500 mi) at 12 kn (22 km/h; 14 mph)
- Complement: 16 officers, 260 enlisted
- Armament: 4 × 5 in (127 mm)/38 caliber DP guns; 4 × 40 mm (1.6 in) guns; 4 × 20 mm (0.79 in) AA guns, 5 × 21 in (533 mm) torpedo tubes (5 Mark 15 torpedoes); 6 × depth charge projectors, 2 × depth charge tracks

USS Stockton (DD-646), a Gleaves-class destroyer, was the third ship of the United States Navy to be named for Commodore Robert F. Stockton.

Stockton was laid down on 24 July 1942 at Kearny, New Jersey, by Federal Shipbuilding and Drydock Co. and launched on 11 November 1942 sponsored by Mrs. Horace K. Corbin. The ship was commissioned on 11 January 1943.

== Service history ==
=== Atlantic service ===
After shakedown, Stockton joined the Atlantic Fleet on 15 March 1943 and began escorting convoys between New York and North African ports. Between 28 May 1943 and 3 January 1944, she escorted four convoys.

On her last convoy run, she escorted two oilers to Ponta Delgada, in the Azores, in company with Thorn — the first ships to enter the port under the terms of the new agreement between the Allies and the government of Portugal. On 24 January 1944, Stockton got underway for the South West Pacific theatre.

=== Transfer to Pacific and Admiralties campaign ===
On arrival, Stockton joined the Seventh Fleet forces assembled for the invasion of Los Negros Island in the Admiralties. She participated in the initial bombardment that cleared the way for the landings on 29 February and remained in the area for three days, patrolling and giving fire support to the forces ashore. From 9 to 13 March, she supported similar but smaller landings in Seeadler Harbor. As American forces leapfrogged along the northern coast of New Guinea, Stockton acted as an antiaircraft and antisubmarine screening vessel during the landings in Humboldt Bay on 22 April and at Wakde on 17 May; and she provided gunfire support for the Biak landings on 27 May. While off Biak, she received minor damage when hit by a shell from a shore battery on 28 May, and on 12 June, she towed Kalk into Humboldt Bay, after that destroyer had been immobilized by a bomb hit amidships.

=== New Guinea operations ===
On 2 July, she was with the invasion forces off Noemfoor and acted both as screening and fire-support ship during the landings. After a month of escort and training duty along the northern coast of New Guinea, she sailed from New Guinea on 22 August to join units of the 3rd Fleet for the invasion of the Palau Islands. The destroyer escorted the transports as they approached Peleliu on 15 September and protected them after the landings until she headed home on 14 October.

=== Iwo Jima and Okinawa ===
After overhaul at Seattle, Washington, Stockton completed refresher training at Pearl Harbor on 24 January 1945. Between 10 February and 9 March, she screened escort carriers as they provided air cover for the landings on Iwo Jima. On 21 February, two days after the landings, Stockton's group was attacked by four suicide planes, which sank the escort carrier Bismarck Sea, and damaged Lunga Point. From 18 March to the end of the war, the destroyer escorted replenishment units of the Logistics Support Group as they provided fuel and supplies to the Fleet during the Okinawa campaign and the concurrent air strikes on the Ryukyus and the Japanese home islands. On 31 March — the day before the Okinawa landings — Stockton and Morrison sank the Japanese submarine I-8, after a 3½-hour action. In early April, Stockton directed the salvage of Thornton, which had collided with two tankers of Stockton's group.

=== End of World War II and fate ===
Stockton continued her support duties during the first 1½ months of the occupation of Japan. She sailed on 15 October from Japan and proceeded, via Singapore and Cape Town, to New York City. The destroyer was decommissioned on 16 May 1946 and placed in reserve at Charleston, South Carolina. She was struck from the Navy list on 1 July 1971.

Stockton received 8 battle stars for her World War II service.

=== Use in fiction ===
A ship by the name of Stockton was mentioned in Andy Weir's novel The Martian and the film adaptation of the same name, the ship likely being a modern vessel of the same name.
