= Templar automobile =

Defunct American motor vehicle manufacturer

Templar Motors Corporation
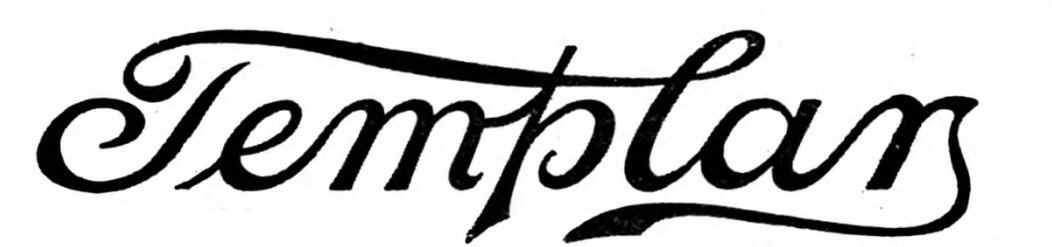
- Industry: Automotive
- Founded: 1917; 109 years ago
- Defunct: 1924; 102 years ago
- Headquarters: Lakewood, Ohio, United States

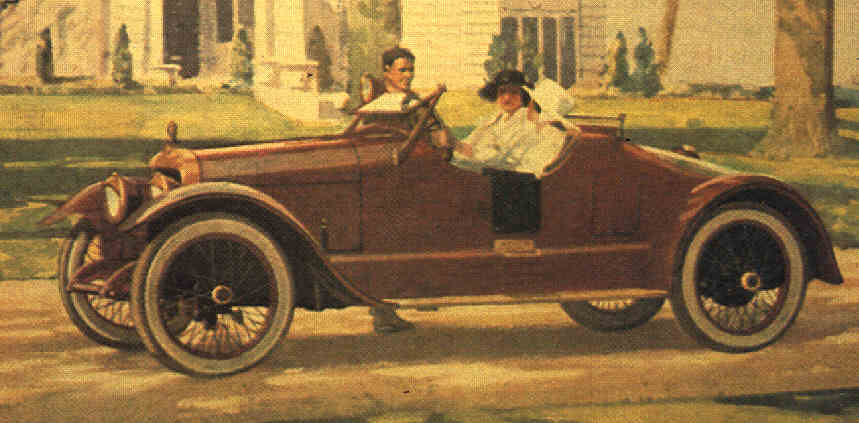
The 1919 Templar car

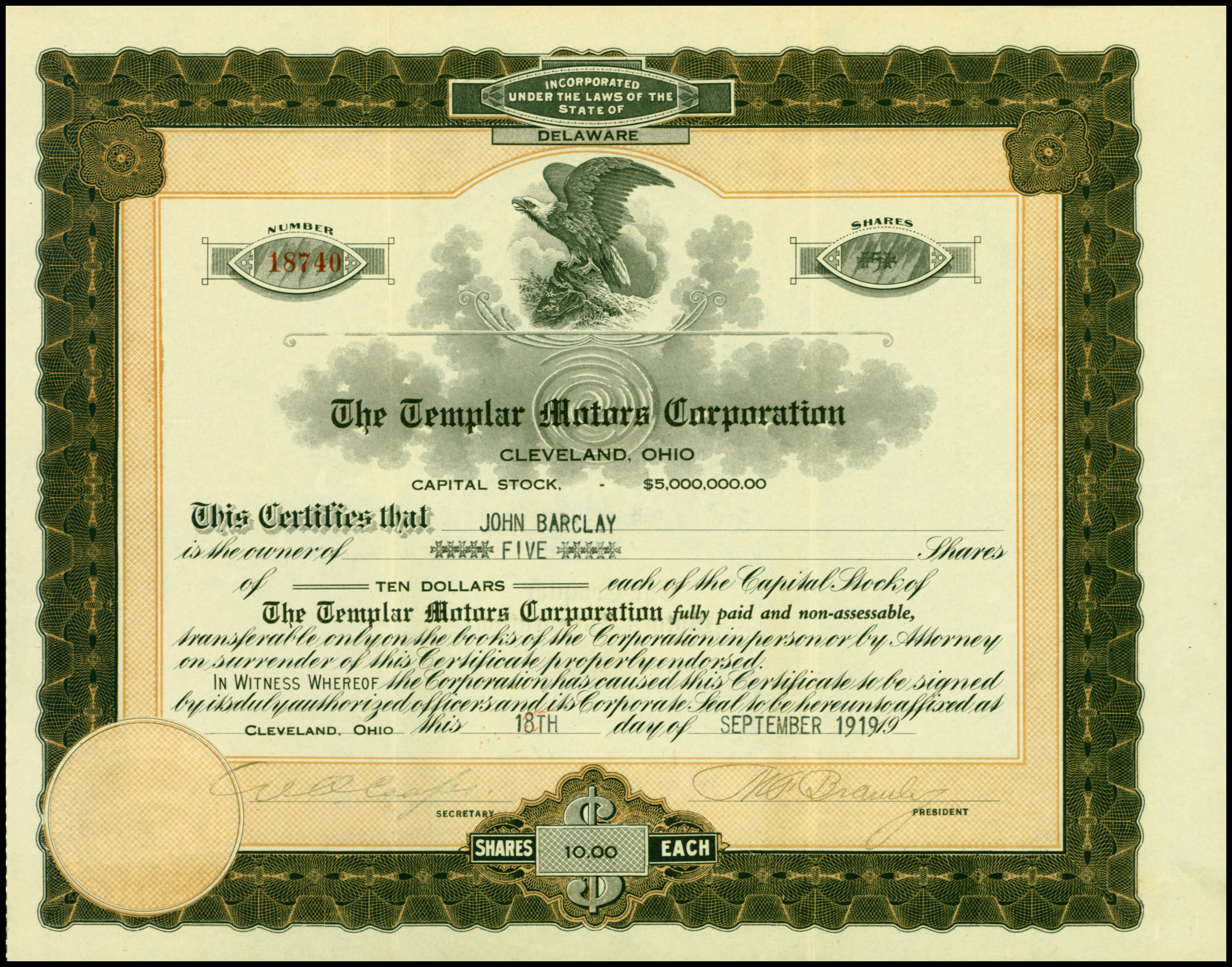
Share of the Templar Motors Corporation, issued 18. September 1919

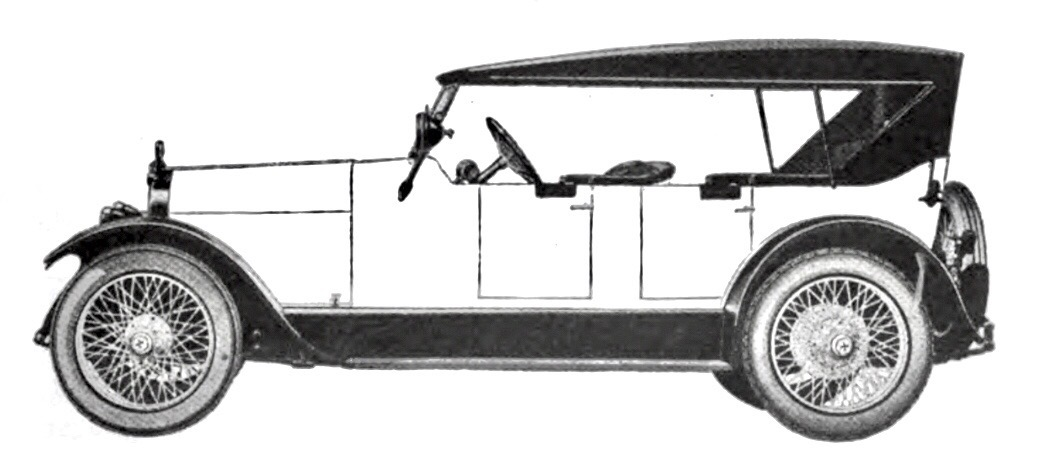
Templar (1921)

Templar was a manufacturer of automobiles in Lakewood, Ohio from 1917 to 1924. The company was named for the Knights Templar and used a Maltese Cross as an emblem.

Advertising themselves as "The pioneer builder of quality small cars", the first Templar car had a four-cylinder, overhead-valve engine of 3.2 litres capacity coupled to a three-speed transmission mounted in a chassis with a 118-inch (3,000 mm) wheelbase. The entry of the United States into World War I severely curtailed production, the company making artillery shells for the war effort. Only around 150 cars were made in 1918. Body styles included a coupe with coachwork by Leon Rubay at US$4250, a Victoria Elite tourer, a 3-door sedan and a sports model called the Sportette at US$2400. The cars were extremely well equipped with a compass and Kodak camera as standard equipment.

Full production resumed in 1919 with 3 body types, the coupe, Sportette and sedan. 1800 cars were built by the 900 employees. While the post war boom continued, the company could sell every car it made and Templar even increased prices in 1920 and 1921. The 1921 coupe, still basically the 1917 car, cost US$3785, as did the five-passenger sedan, while the five-seat tourer, four-passenger Sportette, and two-seat touring roadster were US$2885.

By contrast, an Enger 40 was US$2000, the FAL was US$1750, US$2000, the Oakland 40 US$1600, the Cole 30 and Colt Runabout were each US$1500, the high-volume Oldsmobile Runabout was US$650, and Western's Gale Model A was US$500, but Templars were still well below the Lozier Light Six Metropolitan tourer and runabout at US$3,250 and coupe US$3,850 or even American's lowest-price model, which was US$4250 (its highest was US$5250), while the 1913, Lozier Big Six tourer and roadster started at US$5,000.

Competition was increasing, so in 1922, two cheaper models were announced, a roadster and a Deluxe Sports at US$1985. Production was severely affected following a major fire which had swept through the works in December 1921, and receivers were appointed in October 1922.

The company was re-financed and became the Templar Motor Car Company in 1923, and work started on a 4.3-litre six-cylinder engine, as the new management decided the future was in larger cars. The new models were based around a 122-inch (3,100 mm) wheelbase frame with a range of four- and five-seat bodies. Four-wheel brakes were also introduced. However, only 125 cars were sold in 1923.

By late 1924, it seems the money ran out, and the company passed into the ownership of a local bank who had called in a loan, and production ceased.

== Sources ==
- Clymer, Floyd. Treasury of Early American Automobiles, 1877–1925. New York: Bonanza Books, 1950.
