= Jonathan Thorn =

US Navy officer (1779–1811)

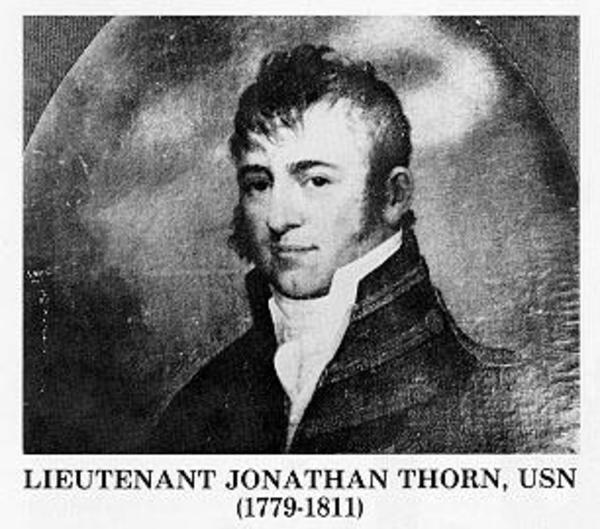
- Jonathan Thorn
- Born: January 8, 1779; Schenectady, New York, U.S.
- Died: June 15, 1811 (aged 32); Clayoquot Sound, British Canada
- Burial place: unknown
- Military career
- Allegiance: United States of America
- Branch: United States Navy
- Service years: 1800–1810
- Rank: Lieutenant
- Commands: New York Navy Yard (1806–1807); Tonquin; Pacific Fur Company, 1810–1811
- Conflicts: Tripolitan War

Jonathan Thorn (8 January 1779 – 15 June 1811) was a career officer of the United States Navy in the early 19th century.

== Early life and Naval career ==
Born on 8 January 1779 in Schenectady, New York, during the Revolutionary War, Thorn was the eldest of fifteen children of Samuel Thorn and Helena Van Slyck Thorn.

He was appointed a midshipman at age 21 on 28 April 1800. His brother Robert Livingston also served in the U.S. Navy as a surgeon on the frigate USS Constellation during the War of 1812. His other brother, Herman, was a purser on the USS Wasp and the USS Peacock. Jonathon Thorn served in the Navy during the Tripolitan War and volunteered to take part in the hazardous expedition to destroy the captured frigate Philadelphia, which was moored beneath the guns of the defended Tripoli harbor. On 16 February 1804, Lieutenant Stephen Decatur led a party of these volunteers in the ketch Intrepid into Tripoli and burned the American ship so it could not be used by the enemy.

Attached to the schooner Enterprise, Thorn was assigned to Gunboat No. 4, under Decatur's command. In this vessel, he participated in the attack on Tripoli with Commodore Edward Preble's squadron on 3 August 1804. Specially commended by Decatur for his conduct in this battle, Thorn received command of one of the Tripolitan gunboats captured. On 7 August, he commanded this vessel and crew in the engagement with the Tripolitan pirates.

== Brooklyn Navy Yard ==
Thorn was assigned as the first commandant of the New York Navy Yard at age 27 in June 1806 and served there for 13 months. Appointed an acting lieutenant in November 1803, he was promoted to full lieutenant on 16 February 1807. Thorn was the youngest officer ever to command a United States Naval Yard. His letters reflect his efforts to build, preserve, and inventory gunboats. "A junior officer Thorn's position at the navy yard and his independence of action were hampered by his rank and a somewhat suspicious and inflexible nature. Thorn's tenure in Brooklyn though was brief; his few surviving letters disclose a young man plagued by doubts, suffering poor physical and possibly mental health. In July 1807 Thorn exhausted requested and was granted a leave of absence. In addition to his health, Thorn was probably frustrated by the lack of promotional opportunities. In the peacetime navy promotions were few and Thorn must have sensed his tenure in Brooklyn would not improve his prospects..."

== Pacific Fur Company ==
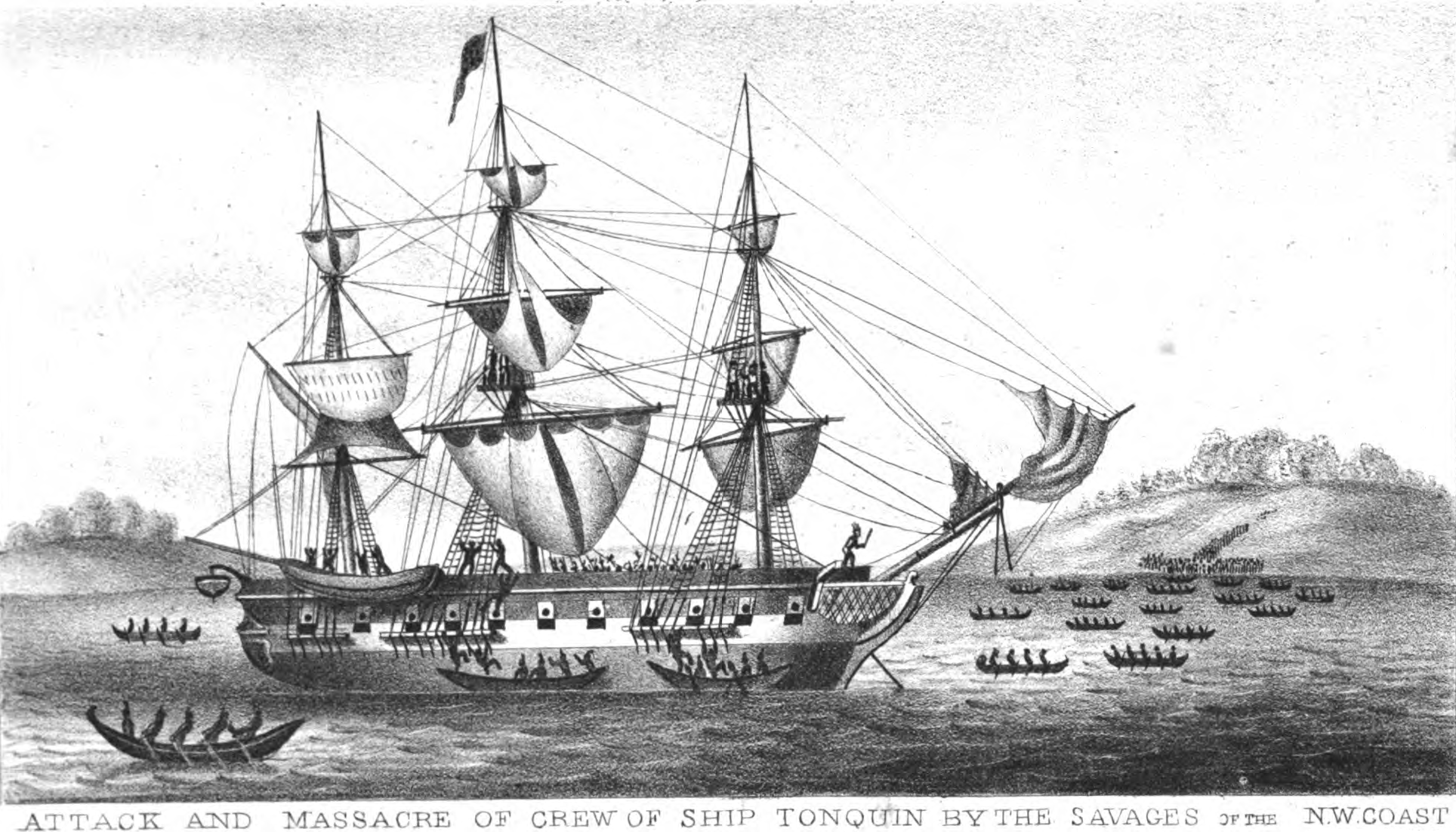
The Tonquin

In 1810, Thorn was granted a two-year furlough to command the Pacific Fur Company's sailing bark, the Tonquin, owned by John Jacob Astor. The Tonquin was to sail to the Pacific Northwest to establish a fur trading post. The Tonquin left New York City on 8 September 1810, sailing around Cape Horn on Christmas Day. The crew stopped off in the Kingdom of Hawaii to gather additional labor and resources, arriving at the mouth of the Columbia River on 22 March 1811. Two days later and at the cost of eight lives, the Tonquin crossed the bar.

Thorn and his crew spent 65 days near the mouth of the river, where they built Fort Astoria on the south side of the river, in present-day Astoria. On 5 June, the ship crossed the bar and headed north along the coast to trade for furs. Thorn anchored off Clayoquot Sound (now in British Columbia) around 15 June, having traveled along the west side of Vancouver Island. He soon tried to trade with the local Tla-o-qui-aht people. Mutually satisfactory terms could not be settled upon, and Thorn slapped the elder appointed to represent the indigenous interests with a fur he was purchasing in the face. Insulted by this behavior, the natives soon attacked and killed the majority of the crew. The last five men drove off the Tla-o-qui-aht. Later four men escaped from the ship, but three were found ashore and killed. The next day, natives returned to plunder the ship; James Lewis, the last surviving crew member on board, feigned a truce to lure them on the ship, then lit the gunpowder magazine and blew it up, sacrificing his life to prevent it from being used by the Tla-o-qui-at. The only known crew survivor was Joseachal, an interpreter from the Quinault nation who had relatives among the Tla-o-qui-at.

=== Leadership ===
Thorn's behavior has been sharply criticized by fur traders who had to sail with him. In particular Gabriel Franchère stated that:

He was a strict disciplinarian, of a quick and passionate temper, accustomed to exact obedience, considering nothing but duty, and giving himself no trouble about the murmurs of his crew, taking council of nobody, and following Mr. Astor's instructions to the letter. Such was the man who had been selected to command our ship. His haughty manners, his rough and overbearing disposition, had lost him the affection of most of the crew and all the passengers: he knew it, and in consequence, sought every opportunity to mortify us...

Alexander Ross recounted:

...for the captain, in his frantic fits of passion, was capable of going any lengths, and would rather have destroyed the expedition, the ship, and everyone on board, than be thwarted in what he considered as ship discipline or his nautical duties.

== Legacy and honors ==
Two U.S. Navy destroyers have been named USS Thorn in his honor.
