= Clatsop (disambiguation) =

The Clatsop are an ethnic group native to the US state of Oregon.

Clatsop may also refer to:

== Geography ==
- Clatsop County, Oregon, a county in northwestern Oregon
- Clatsop Butte, an upland butte in Portland, Oregon
- Clatsop Mission, a Methodist station
- Clatsop Plains, an area of wetlands and sand dunes in Oregon
- Clatsop Spit, a large sand spit off the coast of Oregon
- Clatsop State Forest, an Oregon state forest
- Fort Clatsop, an encampment of the Lewis and Clark expedition in modern-day Oregon

== Other uses ==
- Clatsop Community College, a community college in Clatsop County
