= Josiah Lamberson Parrish =

American missionary in Oregon (1806–1895)

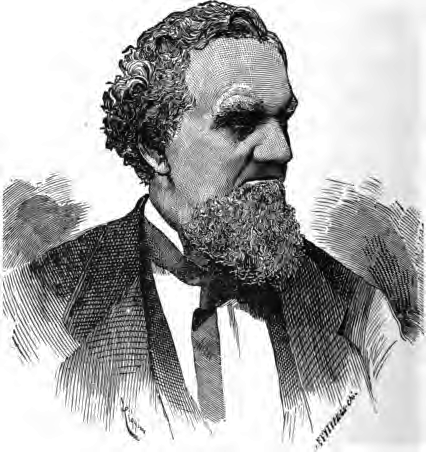
- Born: January 14, 1806; Onondaga County, New York
- Died: May 31, 1895 (aged 89)
- Occupation: blacksmith
- Employer: Methodist Mission
- Title: Voter at Champoeg Meetings
- Term: 1843
- Board member of: Willamette University
- Spouse(s): Elizabeth Winn (d. 1869); Jane Lichtenthaler (d. 1887); M.A. Pierce
- Children: 4, including Samuel B. Parrish

Reverend Josiah Lamberson Parrish (January 14, 1806 – May 31, 1895) was an American missionary in the Pacific Northwest and trustee of the Oregon Institute at its founding. A native of New York, he also participated in the Champoeg Meetings that led to the formation of the Provisional Government of Oregon in 1843. Parrish was married three times and was the first breeder of pure-bred sheep in Oregon.

== Early life ==
Josiah Parrish was born in Onondaga County, New York, to Sally Parrish (née Lamberson) and Benjamin Parrish on January 14, 1806. His mother was of Dutch and Puritan heritage born in New Jersey, with his father of English lineage born in 1777 in Connecticut. Josiah was the oldest of ten children in the family. He attended the public schools of his native state. At age sixteen the family moved and Josiah became employed on the Erie Canal at Lockport.

Josiah was married in 1833 in New York to Elizabeth Winn (died 1869), and they had four children, one of whom was Samuel B. Parrish. In 1839, the trained blacksmith volunteered to join Jason Lee's mission in the Willamette Valley. Parrish and around 50 others sailed on the ship Lausanne around Cape Horn in South America to the Columbia River and on to Oregon City in what has been called the Great Reinforcement of the Methodist Mission. They set sail on October 9, 1839, from New York City.

== Missionary ==
Parrish and the others arrived in Oregon in May 1840. Beginning in February 1841 Parrish became involved in the movement towards creating a white colonist government in the Willamette Valley, which on May 3, 1843, at the last of the Champoeg Meetings he voted in favor of creating the Provisional Government of Oregon. The vote to create a government passed 52-50. During the two years of on and off meetings he helped to build the Star of Oregon that was sailed to California by a crew led by Joseph Gale. In California the vessel was sold in order to purchase cattle to be driven overland to the Willamette Valley. On February 1, 1842, Parrish was selected as a trustee to the new Oregon Institute, a school established to teach the children of the missionaries that later became Willamette University.

Also in 1842, Parrish moved to the Clatsop Plains and took over the Clatsop Mission from Joseph H. Frost. In 1844, when the Methodist Mission was dissolved by George Gary, Parrish purchased the Clatsop Plains mission. From 1849 until 1854 he worked as an Indian agent in the now Oregon Territory. As a rancher he was the first breeder in Oregon of pure-breed sheep, and had brought the first white clover seed to Oregon when he migrated aboard the Lausanne.

== Later life ==
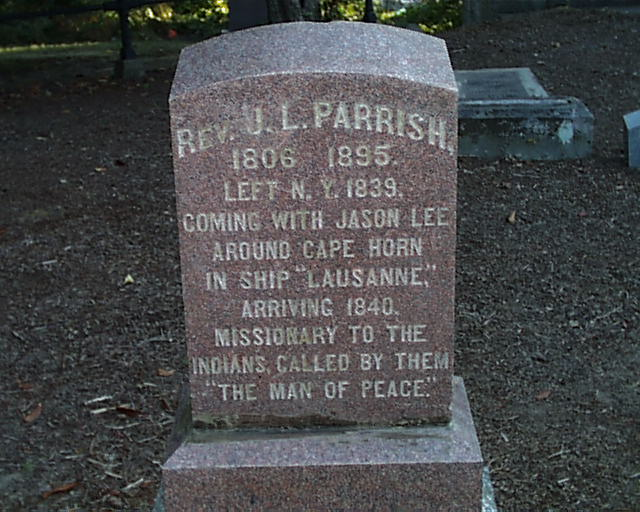
Gravestone of J. L. Parrish

Parrish became involved in a land dispute involving the authority of the laws from the Provisional Government with Daniel H. Lownsdale. Parrish took the matter to court in a case that made its way through the Oregon Supreme Court and to the United States Supreme Court in Lownsdale v. Parrish, 62 U.S. 290 (1858). In 1868, Parrish drove the first spike in Portland, Oregon, for the Oregon and California Railroad.

In 1869, his wife, Elizabeth Parrish, donated land to help create the Lee Mission Cemetery in Salem, Oregon, with Josiah as one of the incorporators. Later that year his wife Elizabeth died, with Josiah remarrying in 1870 to Jane (Jennie) Lichtenthaler Pickett. Married in Portland, the couple had two children, Gertrude Grace and Josephine Leilani before Jane, known as Jennie, died in 1887. Jennie graduated from Willamette Medical School in 1879 and practiced in both Salem and Portland. In 1888, Josiah married a final time, to Mrs. M. A. Pierce. Josiah Parrish died on May 31, 1895, at the age of 89 and is buried at the Lee Cemetery. Parrish Middle School in Salem was built on his old Donation Land Claim and is named in his honor.

== See also ==
- Picture of the Parrish House
