= Wascopam Mission =

Methodist mission in the Pacific Northwest

Coordinates: 45°35′44″N 121°11′22″W

The Wascopam Mission or Dalles Mission was a branch of the Methodist Mission opened at Celilo Falls in 1838. Among the tribes proselytized were members of the Cayuse, Klickitat, Nez Perce, Shasta, Tenino, Walla Wallas, and Wasco-Wishram. In 1847 the mission was closed and later became the site of Fort Dalles.

== Establishment ==
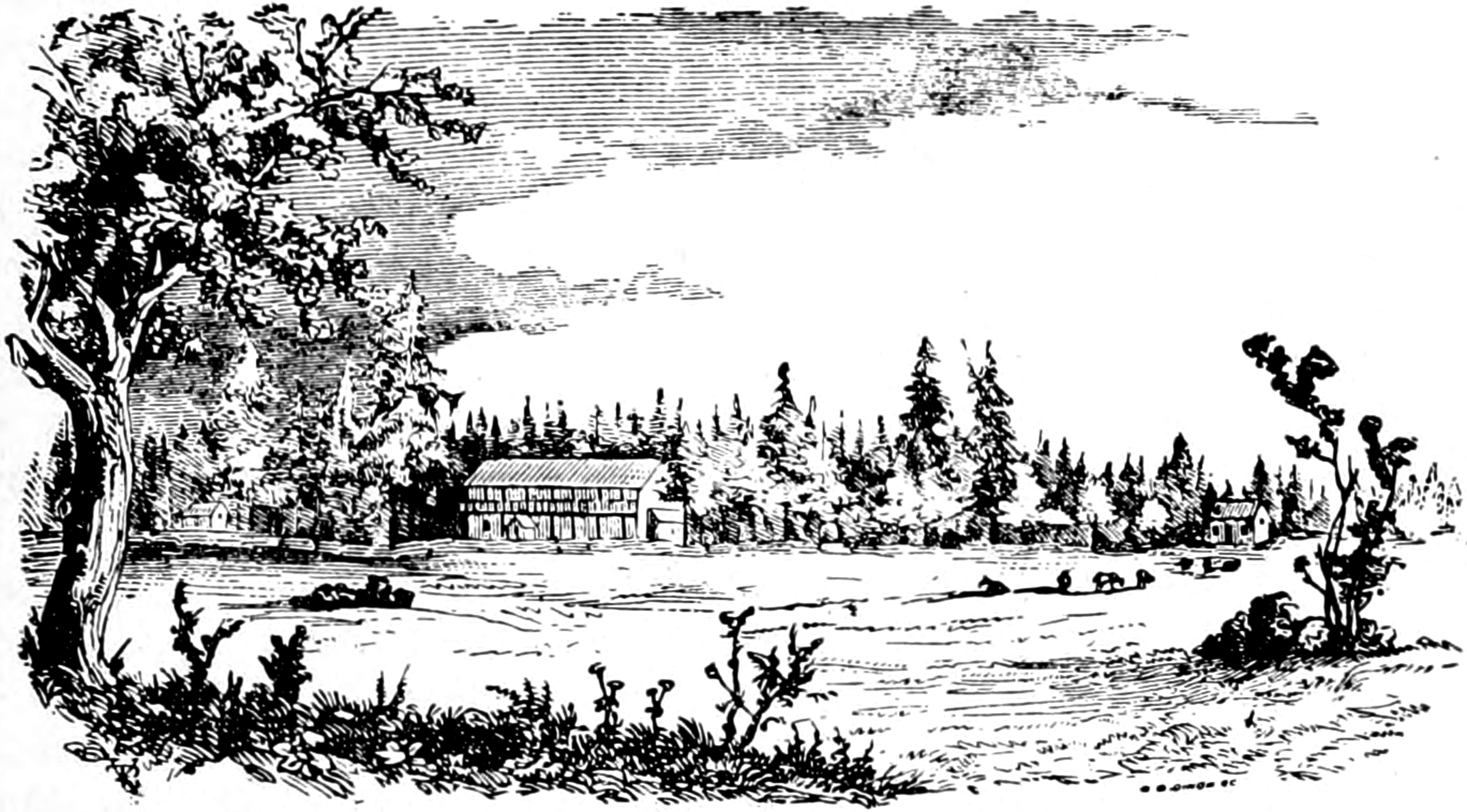
Mission at The Dalles

The Wascopam Mission was established on March 21, 1838, by Reverends Daniel Lee and Henry K. W. Perkins. Lumber for the buildings was cut mostly by neighboring Wascos. The mission was often called Wascopam after them. During its operation, the mission consisted of a schoolhouse, garden, stable, barn, and two dwellings along with a cleared pasture adjacent to the wood huts used by the Native American villagers.

Supplies were procured from Hudson's Bay Company stations Fort Vancouver and Fort Nez Percés along with the Methodist stations of Mission Bottom and later Mission Mill with Chinookan and Walla Walla escorts. During one such trip provisions dwindled to the point that a horse had to be consumed until salmon could be purchased from a Clackamas village.

== Pulpit Rock ==
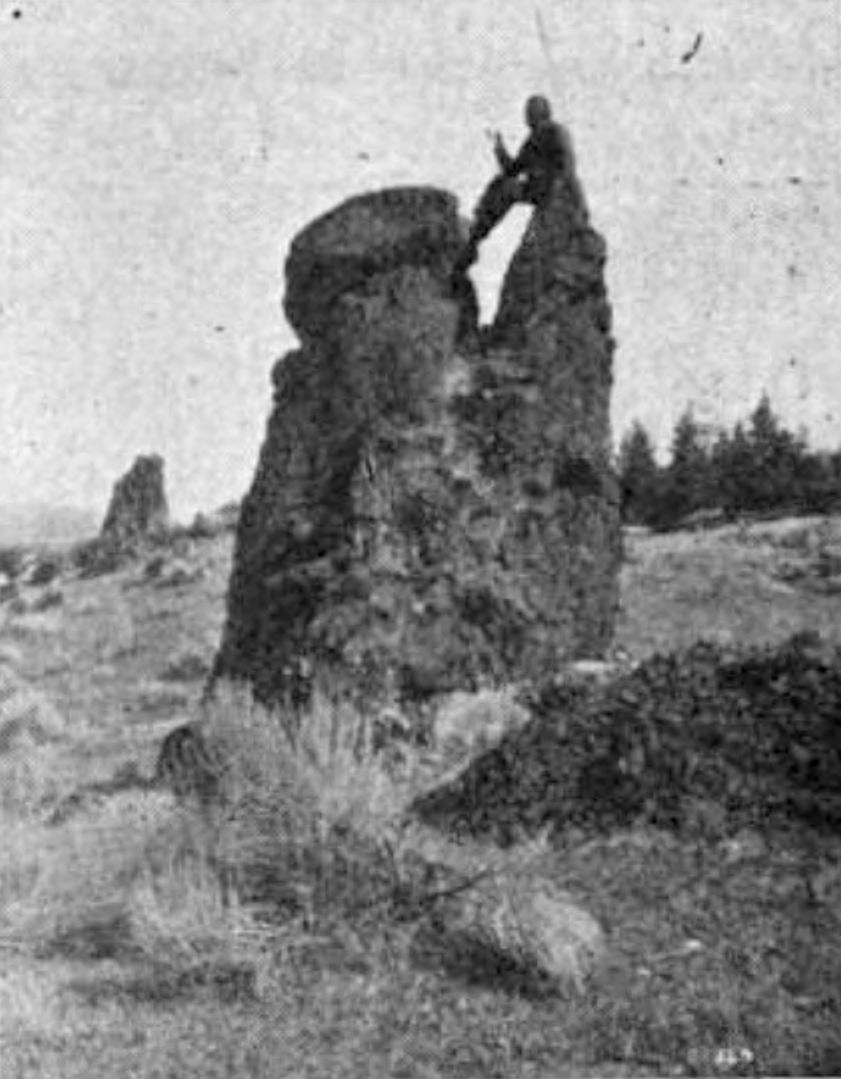
Pulpit Rock

Pulpit Rock is a rock about 12 feet (3.7 m) tall, carved by natural elements in an open area on a slight slope. The Methodist missionaries preached at the location, with some initial success in converting some of the local Indigenous peoples.

The rock currently stands in the intersection of E. 12th and Court streets in the city of The Dalles, Oregon. It is directly south of The Dalles-Wahtonka High School, with a historical marker. The rock has been kept its original location, now in the middle of a street, due to history surrounding it. A mural on a building in downtown The Dalles features the rock prior to the development of the current roads and neighborhood around it.

== Closure ==
The Wascopam Mission was sold for $600 to Marcus Whitman in 1847, who intended to move there. However, after the Whitman massacre and the eruption of the Cayuse War, the mission was occupied by the Oregon militia. The station was returned to the Methodist Mission in 1849; as the ABCFM had yet to be pay for the station, its bill of purchase was waived.

== Fort Dalles ==
The mission was sold by the Methodists to the Federal Government for $24,000. During the 1850s the U.S. Army developed Fort Dalles on the site of the Wascopam Mission. The remaining indigenous people inhabiting the surrounding region were evicted by the U.S. Army to the Warm Springs Indian Reservation. Eventually the location became the center of the modern town of the Dalles.

== Court case ==
Disputes arose in the 1870s between the settlers of the Dalles and the Methodist Church, which still considered the area their property. In 1883 litigation reached the Supreme Court. The judgement rejected the Methodist claims in favor of the settlers. Three years later the church gave $23,000 to settlers who had previously paid for lots on the now defunct claim.

== Bibliography ==
=== Articles ===
- Carey, Charles H. (1922). "The Mission Record Book of the Methodist Episcopal Church, Willamette Station, Oregon Territory, North America, Commenced 1834". The Quarterly of the Oregon Historical Society. 23 (3). Portland: Oregon Historical Society: 230–266. ISSN 2153-1706. JSTOR 20610215.
- Shackelford, R. S. (1915). "The Methodist Mission Claim to the Dalles Town Site". The Quarterly of the Oregon Historical Society. 16 (1): 24–32. ISSN 2153-1706. JSTOR 20609985.

=== Books ===
- Horner, John B. (1919). Oregon: Her History, Her Great Men, Her Literature. Portland, OR: J. K. Gill Co. hdl:2027/mdp.39015027940942 – via Google Books.
- Lee, Daniel; Frost, Joseph H. (1844). Ten Years in Oregon. New York: J. Collard. ISBN 978-0-598-28584-3.

=== Government publications ===
- Suphan, Robert J. (1974). Ethnological report on the Wasco and Tenino Indians. American Indian ethnohistory: Indians of the Northwest. Vol. 11. New York: Garland Publishing Inc. ISBN 9780824007782.

=== Newspapers ===
- Baker, Dean (2001-10-01). "Painting the Past: The Dallas, Ore., brings its rich history to life in an ambitious mural project". The Columbian. Vancouver, WA.
- Carney, Ellen (August 29, 1993). "From The Dalles, it was downhill". Idaho Falls Post Register. Idaho Falls.
- Larsen, Jeff (March 4, 2004). "Getaways: Popular destination is inundated with history". The Seattle Post-Intelligencer. Seattle. p. 4.

=== Websites ===
- Fort Dalles Museum (2021). "Fort Dalles History". Fort Dalles Museum. Archived from the original on 2021-10-15.
- Mellum, Mike (2004). "Pulpit rock". www.worldisround.com. Archived from the original on 2011-06-08.
