= HMS Racoon (1808) =

Sloop of the Royal Navy

- Racoon

History

United Kingdom
- Name: HMS Racoon
- Ordered: 19 October 1805
- Builder: John Preston, Great Yarmouth
- Laid down: March 1806
- Launched: 30 March 1808
- Commissioned: June 1808
- Reclassified: Convict prison ship in 1819
- Fate: Sold 1838

General characteristics
- Class & type: Cormorant-class sloop
- Tons burthen: 425 88/94 (bm)
- Length: 108 ft 4 in (33.0 m) overall; 90 ft 8 3/4 in (27.7 m) keel
- Beam: 29 ft 8 1/2 in (9.1 m)
- Draught: 9 ft (2.7 m)
- Propulsion: Sails
- Complement: 121
- Armament: Upper deck: 16 × 32-pounder carronades; QD: 6 × 18-pounder carronades; Fc: 2 × 6-pounder guns + 2 × 18-pounder carronades

HMS Racoon, sometimes spelled HMS Raccoon, was an 18-gun ship sloop of the Cormorant class of the Royal Navy. She was built by John Preston, of Great Yarmouth, and launched on 30 March 1808. She sailed as far as Fort Astoria on the Columbia River. She became a hospital ship in 1819 and finally was sold in 1838.

== Service ==
Her first commander was Commander James Welsh, under whom she was sent to operate off the African coast. He sailed her to Jamaica on 16 June 1809, but died there in November. His replacement was Commander William Black. She returned to Portsmouth in 1812.

On 14 January 1813 Racoon captured Hope, which the enemy recaptured. Still, a £25,000 insurance payment was payable to Racoon. (Note: A first class share was worth £3164 17s 3d; a sixth-class share was worth £68 6s 4½d.)

Racoon sailed from Rio de Janeiro on 6 July 1813 in company with HMS Phoebe, HMS Cherub, and Isaac Todd sailing around Cape Horn to the Juan Fernandez Islands.

The Royal Navy had been under pressure from the Montreal-based North West Company, who were agitating for them to capture the base of their rival, the Pacific Fur Company. Captain Frazer Smith, of Isaac Todd, had acquired a letter of marque, and her task was to seize Fort Astoria, the Pacific Fur Company's trading outpost on the Columbia River. However, she was a slow sailer and could not keep up with the warships. Racoon then sailed on to Fort Astoria while Phoebe and Cherub set off to search for USS Essex. On the way to the Columbia River an accident during gunnery exercises killed eight men and wounded 20 on Racoon.

Before Racoon arrived at Fort Astoria on 30 November 1813, the North West Company had completed a deal with the Pacific Fur Company that since British ships would be imminently arriving to "take and destroy everything American on the Northwest coast," that they would purchase the assets, for a third of their value. Black arrived to find the matter already settled, though he went through a ceremony of possession and renamed the facility Fort George. (Isaac Todd finally arrived on 23 April 1814. She then sailed for China on 26 September.)

One person aboard Racoon when she arrived at Fort Astoria was Naukane (also known as John Coxe), a Native Hawaiian. The North West Company had hired him as a laborer and to serve as an interpreter for future visits to the Hawaiian Islands.

Racoon sailed to San Francisco. From 13 to 19 March 1814, Racoon underwent repairs on the beach at Ayala Cove on the northern portion of Angel Island. This event gave the name Raccoon Strait to the deep-water channel between Tiburon and Angel Island. Black then sailed to Lima.

On 15 January 1815 Cherub and Racoon left Rio de Janeiro, escorting a convoy that included the storeships Prévoyante and Serapis, and seven merchantmen. They left Pernambuco on 6 March.

Lieutenant James Mangles (acting) was in command of Raccoon at the Cape of Good Hope in 1815. Captain Alexander Montgomerie replaced Black in 1815. Captain John Cook Carpenter was appointed to command in May 1815.

== Post-war and fate ==
Racoon was re-rated as a 20-gun sixth rate in January 1817, under Captain Robert Worgan Festing in 1817.

Between September and October 1819 she underwent conversion to a convict hospital ship at Portsmouth. She remained in service until the Navy sold her for £820 to Mr. Soames on 16 August 1838.

== See also ==
- HMS Blossom (1806)
