= Necanicum River =

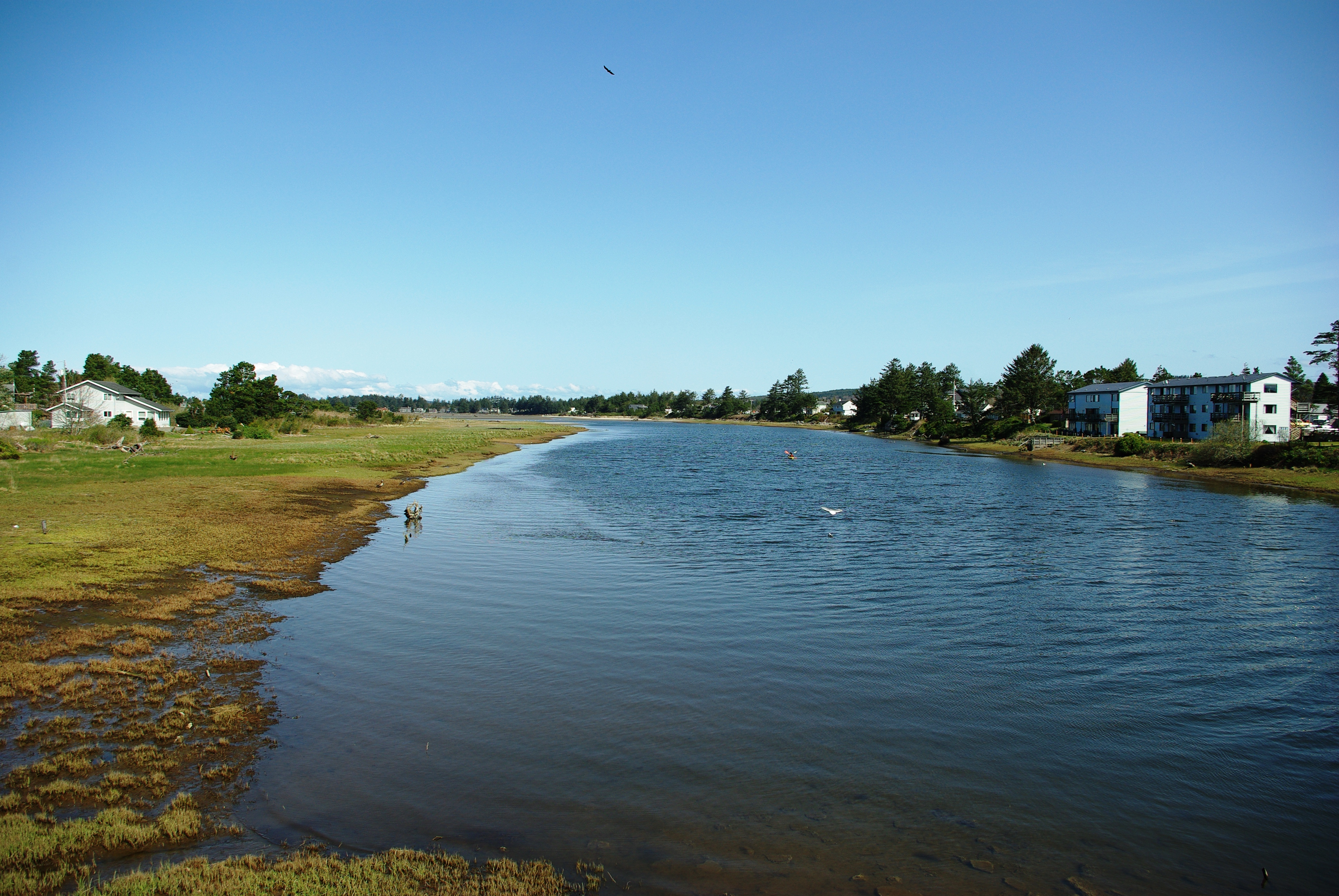
- The river as it flows through Seaside near its outlet to the Pacific Ocean

- Location of the mouth of the Necanicum River in Oregon

Location
- Country: United States
- State: Oregon
- County: Clatsop

Physical characteristics
- Source: Northern Oregon Coast Range
  - location: Humbug Mountain, Clatsop County, Oregon
  - coordinates: 45°55′37″N 123°42′30″W
  - elevation: 1,847 ft (563 m)
- Mouth: Pacific Ocean
  - location: At Seaside, Clatsop County, Oregon
  - coordinates: 46°0′41″N 123°55′39″W
  - elevation: 7 ft (2.1 m)
- Length: 21 mi (34 km)
- Basin size: 83.7 sq mi (217 km^{2})

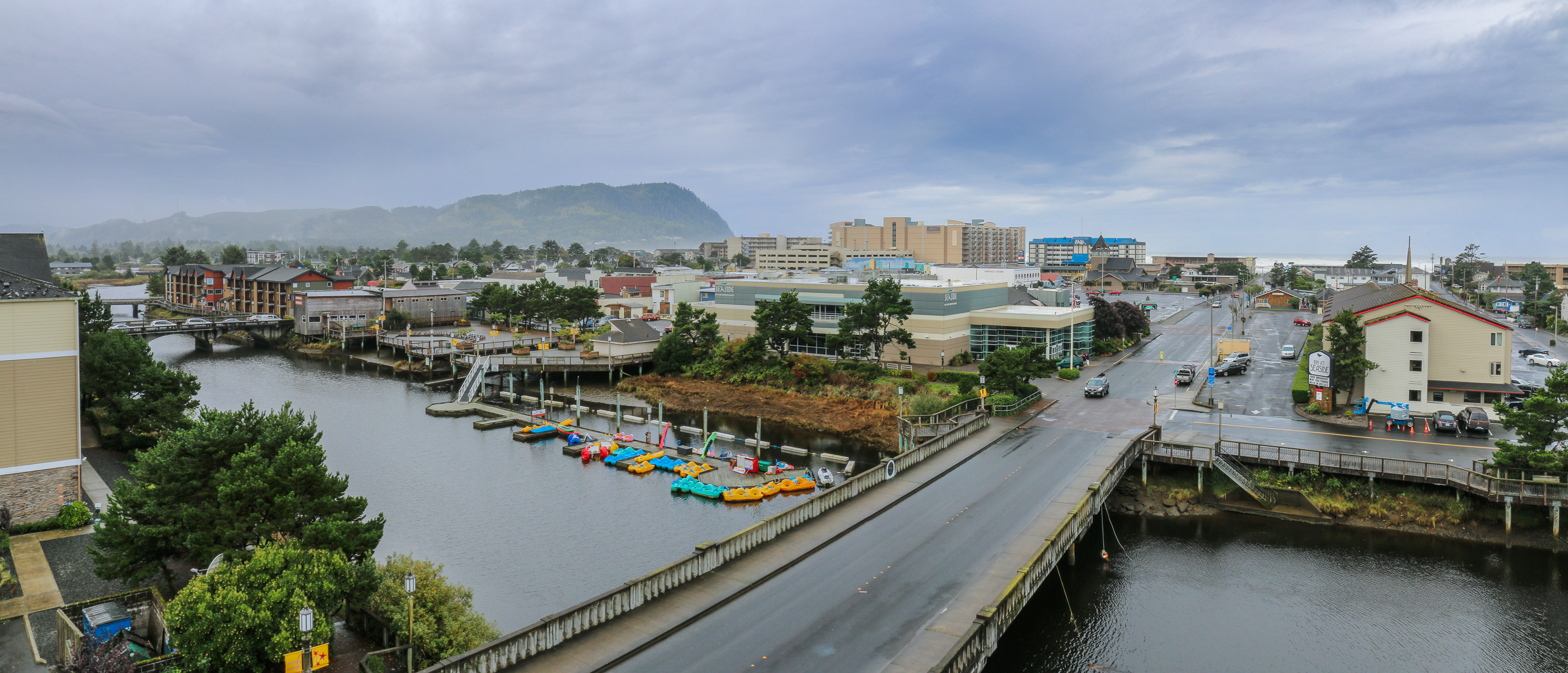
The Necanicum River in Seaside

The Necanicum River is a river on the Pacific coast of northwest Oregon in the United States, approximately 21 miles (34 km) long. It drains a timber-producing area of the Northern Oregon Coast Range northwest of Portland. It forms the first estuary south of the mouth of the Columbia River along the Oregon Coast, reaching the Pacific Ocean at Seaside in Clatsop County.

== History ==
Necanicum is one of several Indian names in northwest Oregon beginning with ne, meaning place. Necanicum is derived from Ne-hay-ne-hum, the name of an Indian village once on the stream. William Clark named it Clatsop River on January 7, 1806, but the name did not stick. The river was also once known as Latty Creek, for William Latty, an early pioneer in the southern part of Seaside.

== Watershed and course ==
The watershed of the Necanicum River drains 83.7 square miles (217 km^{2}). The river rises at approximately 1,847 feet (563 m) above sea level, south of Humbug Mountain (not to be confused with the Humbug Mountain in southwestern Oregon), in south-central Clatsop County and south of the Saddle Mountain State Natural Area. It flows generally west, along U.S. Route 26. Approximately 3 miles (4.8 km) from the coast, east of Tillamook Head, it turns north. The river enters the Pacific Ocean at Seaside. Its final approach to the ocean is nearly parallel to the coast, south to north through downtown Seaside.

Heading downstream, named larger tributaries of the Necanicum River include Grindy Creek (right), Bergsvik Creek (left), Little Humbug Creek (right), North Fork Necanicum River (right), South Fork Necanicum River (left), Mail Creek (left), Klootchy Creek (right), Beeman Creek (right), Circle Creek (left), Neawanna Creek (right), and finally Neacoxie Creek (right). Neacoxie Creek flows in from the north, draining Clatsop Plains, the last tributary before the river enters the ocean.

At one time, Cullaby Lake and Cullaby Creek drained into the river via the Neacoxie. The Clatsop Canal Project – Carnahan Ditch changed this and they now drain into the Skipanon River.

== Ecology and conservation ==
The Necanicum River watershed is important breeding, rearing, and spawning grounds for several anadromous salmonids including chinook salmon (Oncorhynchus tshawytscha), coho salmon (O. kisutch), chum salmon (O. keta), steelhead (O. mykiss irideus), and sea-run cutthroat trout (O. clarki clarki). Resident cutthroat trout, rainbow trout (the stream resident form of O. mykiss irideus) and Pacific lamprey (Entosphenous tridentatus) are also present in the Necanicum River.

Coho salmon use the entire Necanicum River watershed, including all of the subwatersheds, but despite this extensive coho habitat, the coho population is now small. Intensive spawning surveys from 1990 to 2000 indicated that only about 600 fish (range 185 to 1135) use the river. Coho salmon prefer streams with a high degree of structural complexity, including the presence of large woods, flood plains, braided channels, beaver ponds, and occasionally lakes. Anthropogenic activities, including timber harvest, mining, water withdrawals, livestock grazing, road construction, stream channelization, diking of wetlands, and urbanization have damaged this critical habitat. In the mid-1800s, three tribes of Native Americans would gather in the Necanicum estuary each fall to harvest salmon.

In 2006, the Thompson Creek-Stanley Marsh wetland restoration project of the North Coast Land Conservancy began opening ditches that border 80 acres (32 ha) of pasture to restore a functioning Sitka spruce (Picea sitchensis) wetland. Addition of large woody debris and plantings of native willow, alder, spruce, and other wetland vegetation have attracted beavers who have built several dams, accelerating the transition to wetland. Coho salmon populations are already increasing on Thompson Creek, a tributary of Neawanna Creek. Beaver activity, supplementing excavation and restoration techniques, reduced the project cost by an estimated $60,000 to $80,000.

The watershed is also important habitat for Roosevelt elk (Cervus canadensis roosevelti), black tailed deer (Odocoileus hemionus), beaver (Castor canadensis), North American river otters (Lontra canadensis), northern red-legged frog (Rana aurora), and a wide range of birds, from year-round residents like great blue herons (Ardea herodias) to migrating barn and tree swallows (Hirundo rustica and Tachycineta bicolor, respectively).

== See also ==
- List of rivers of Oregon

== Images ==
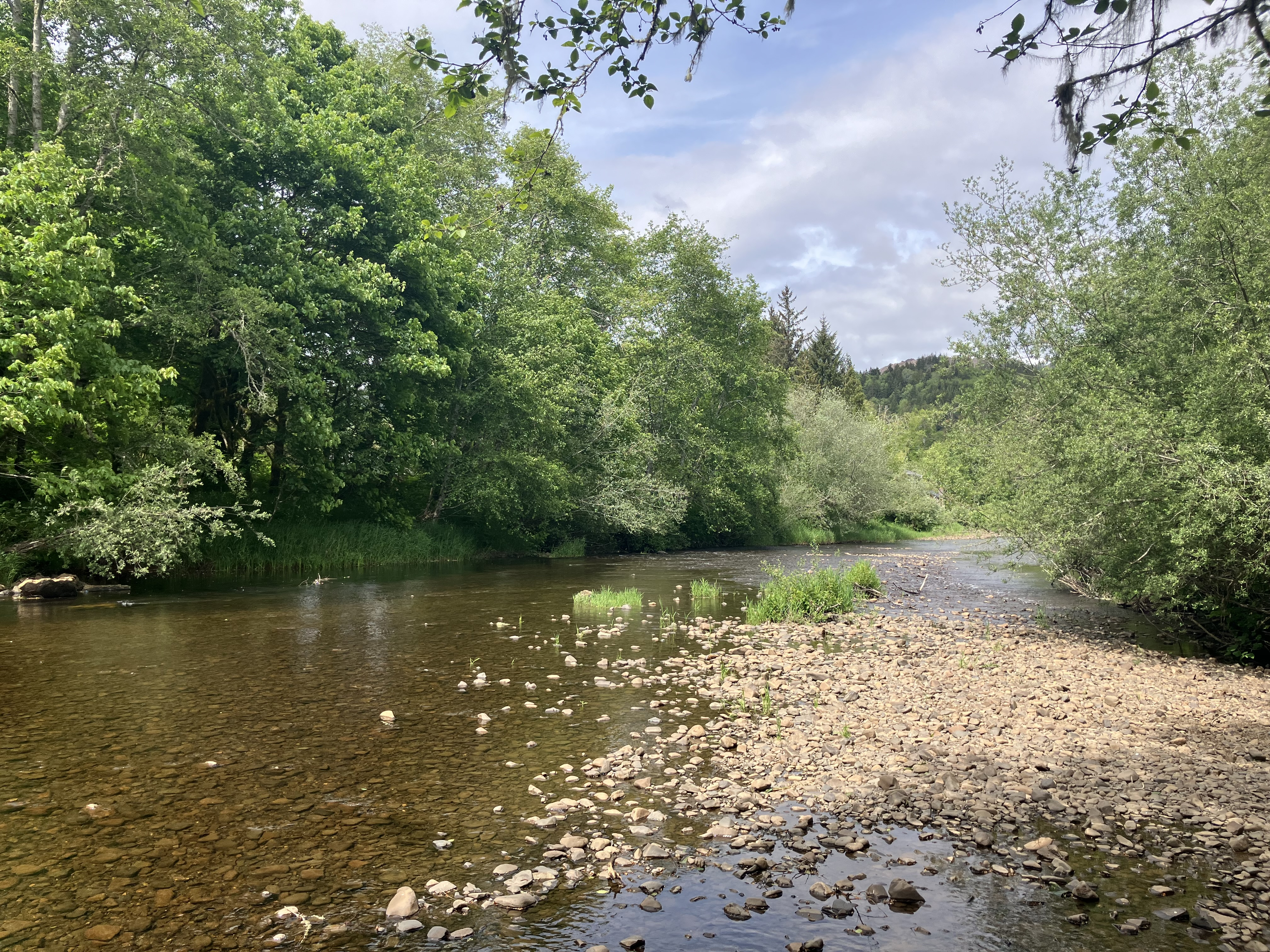
At Klootchy Creek County Park

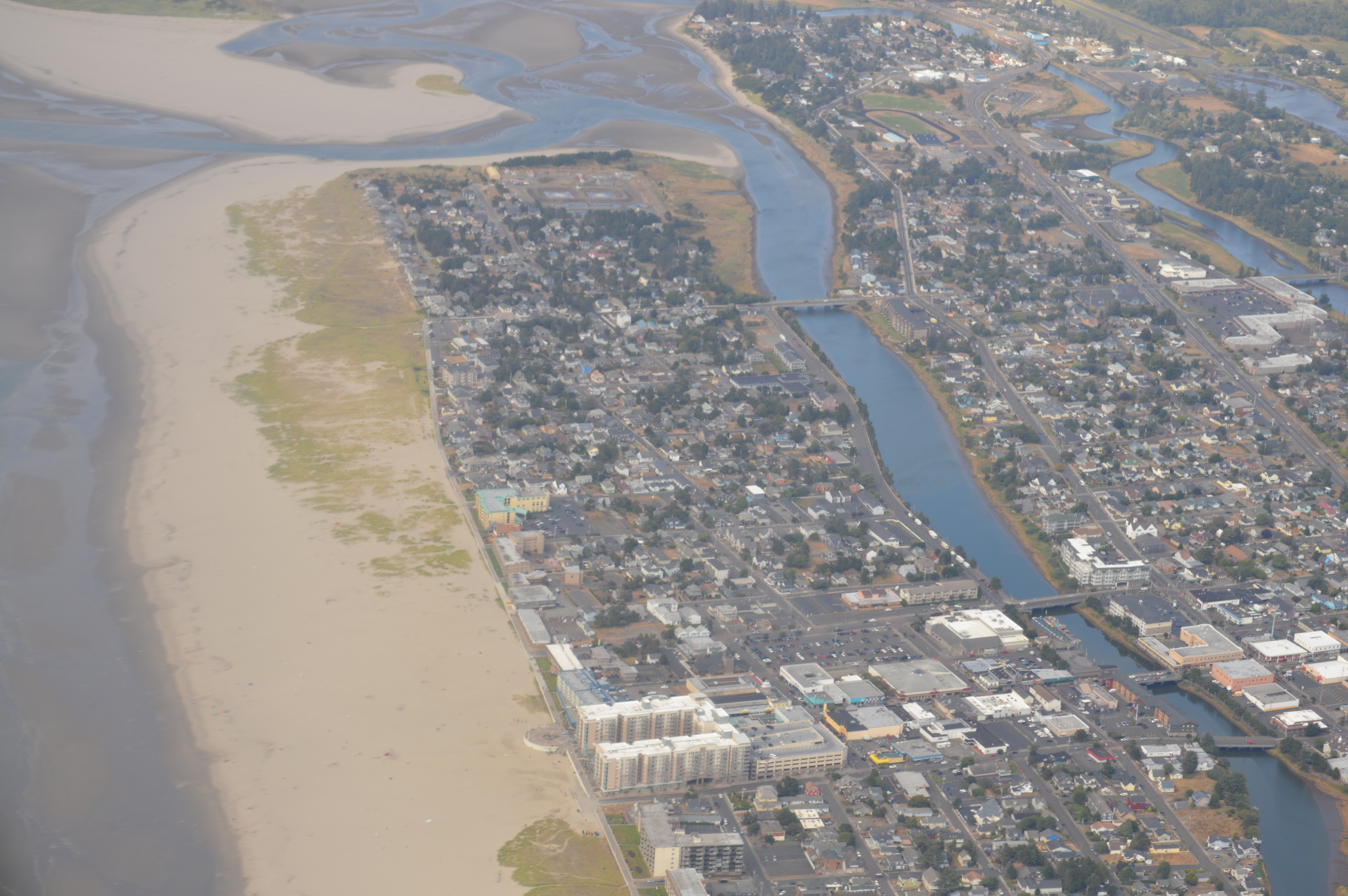
Aerial image of the river flowing south-to-north until turning west to the Pacific

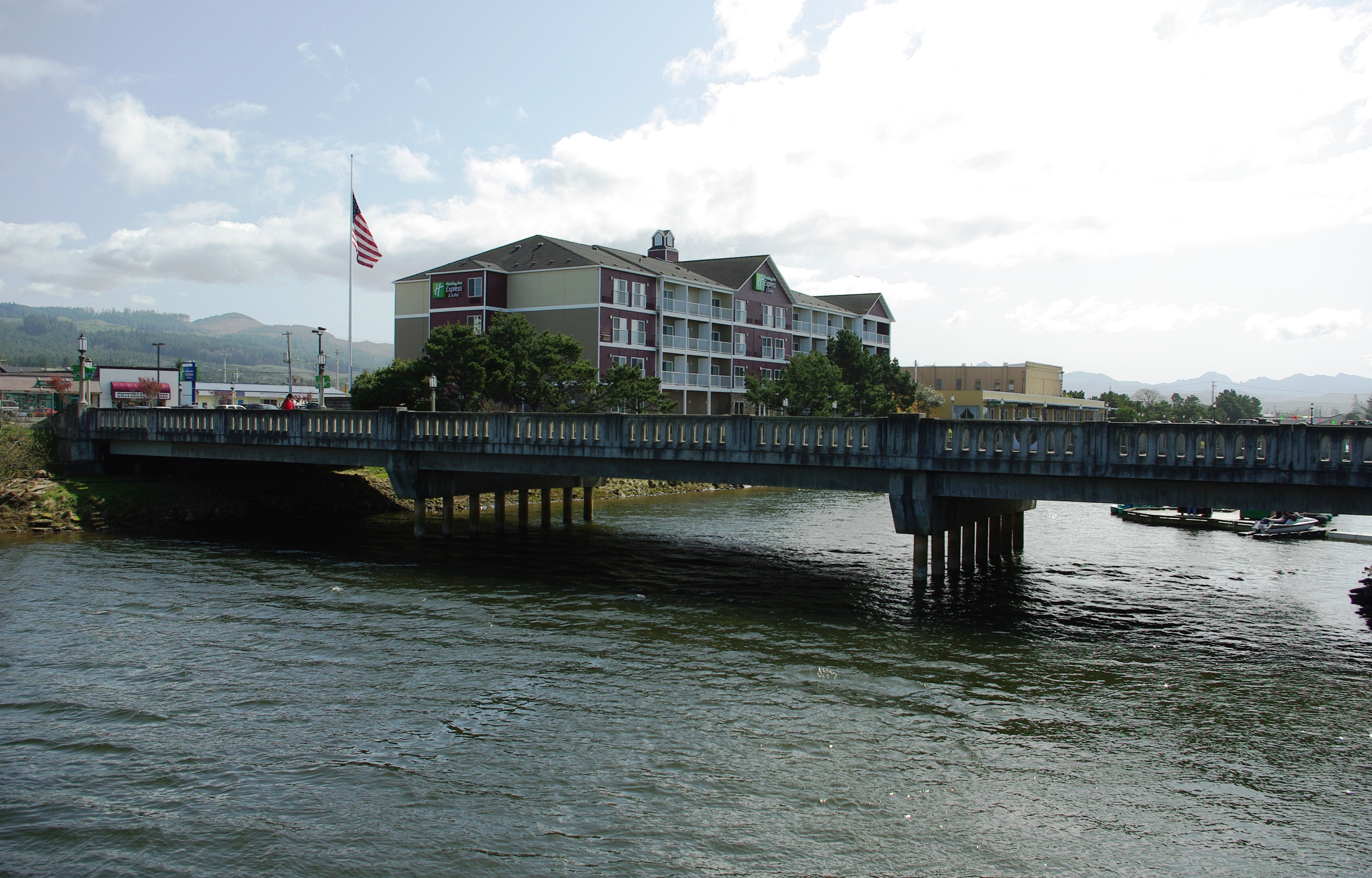
A bridge over the river in the town of Seaside

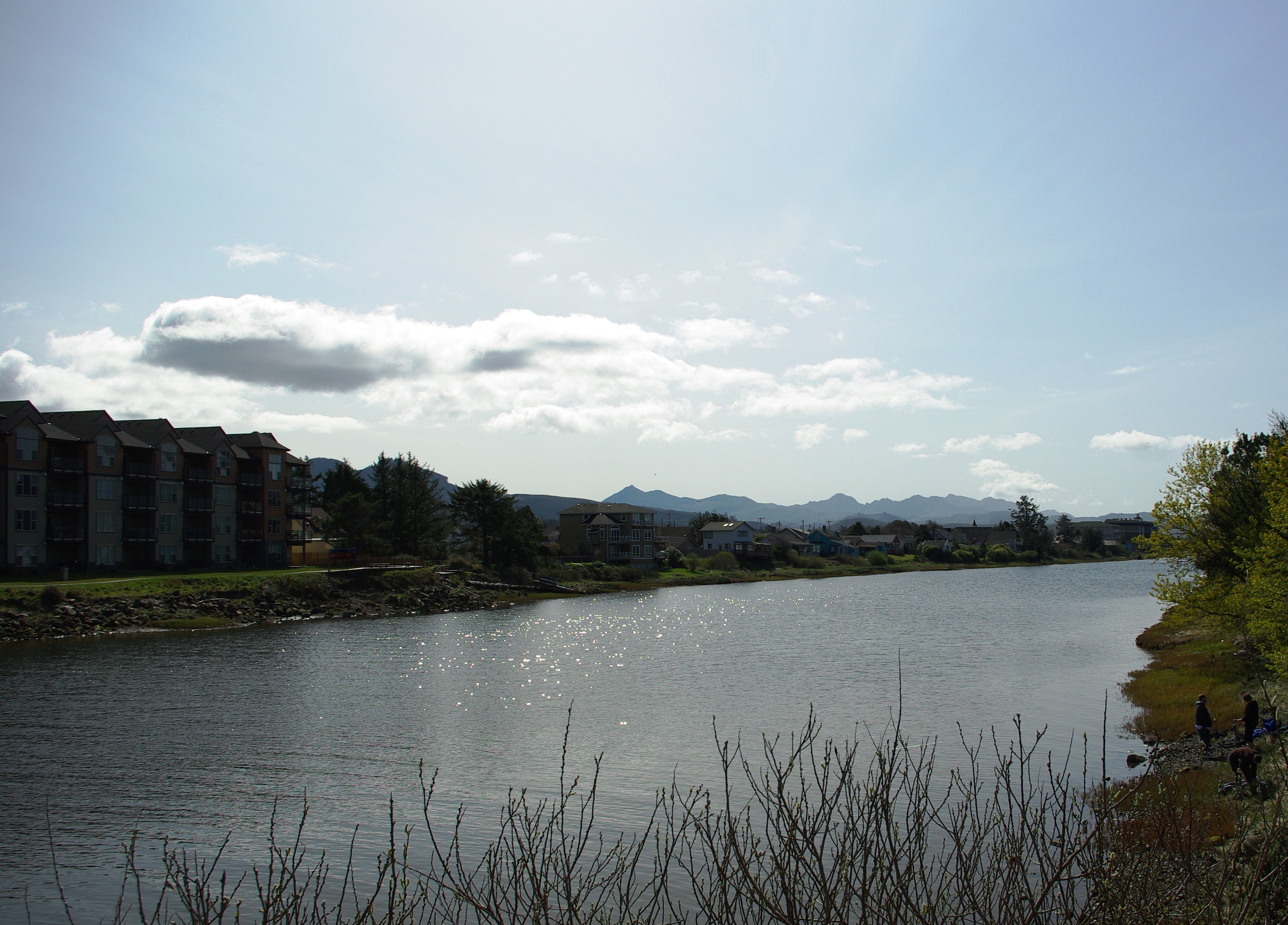
Flowing through the town of Seaside

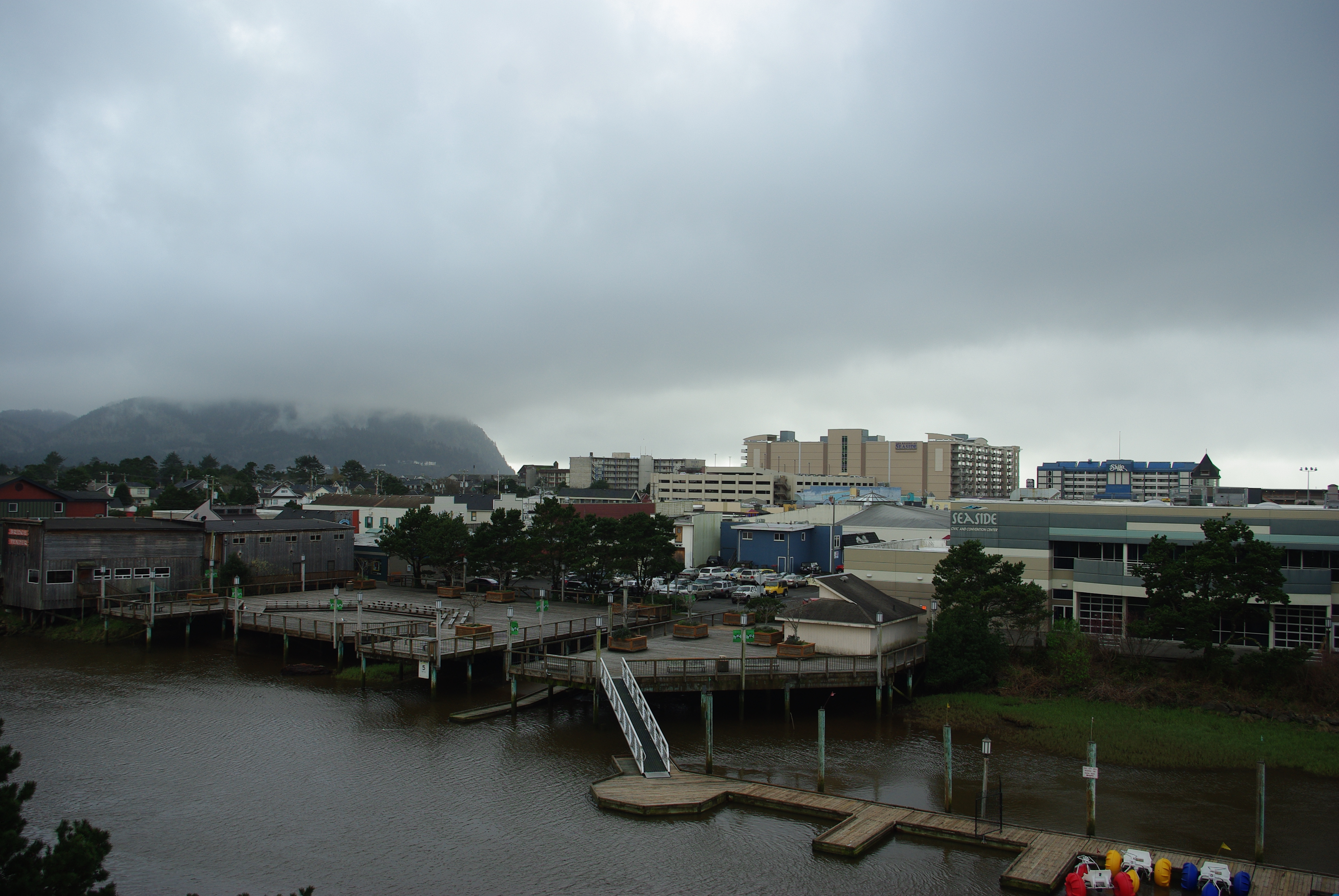
The river in the town of Seaside with boat rental pier

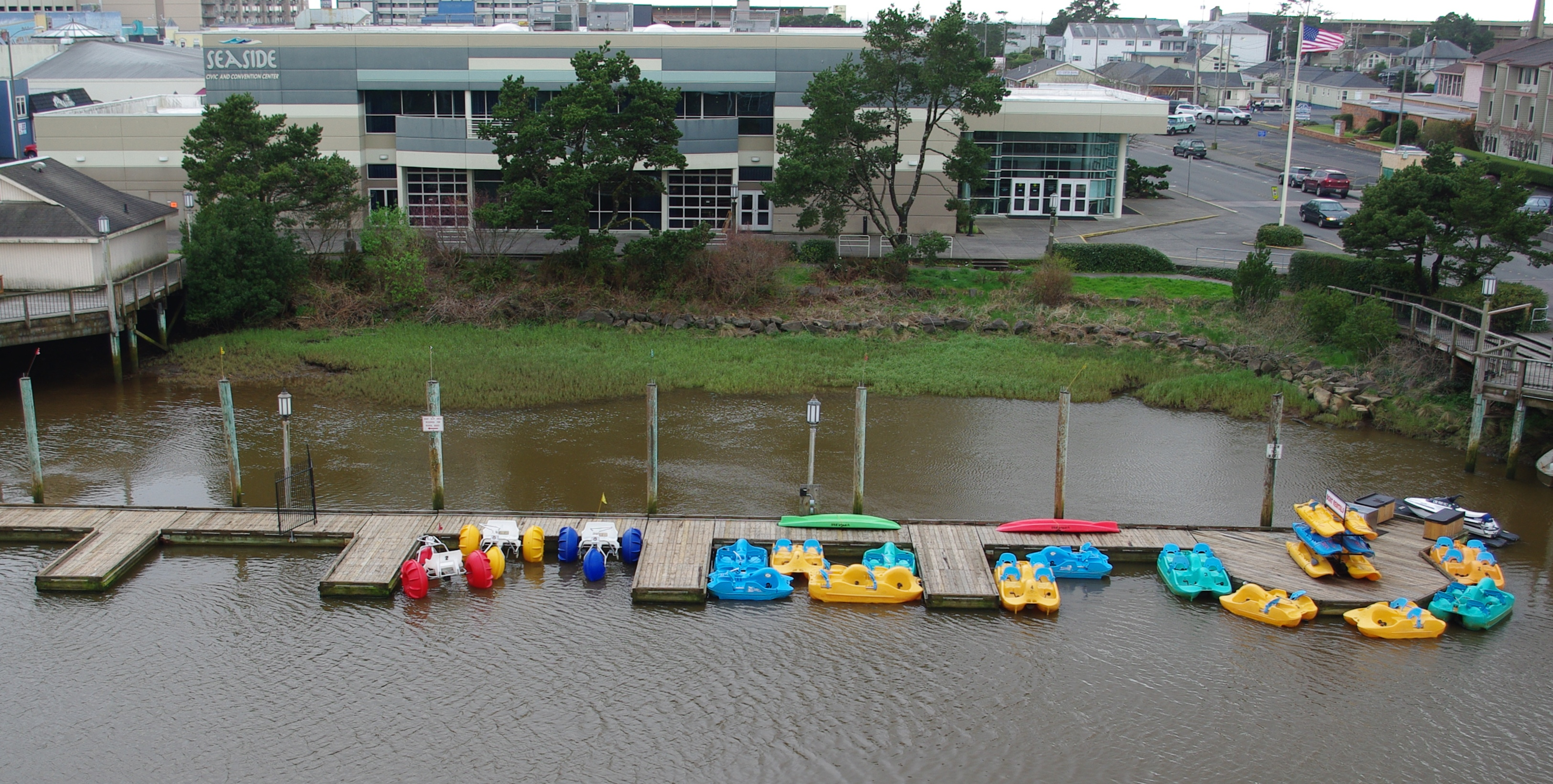
Seaside Convention Center with boat rental pier

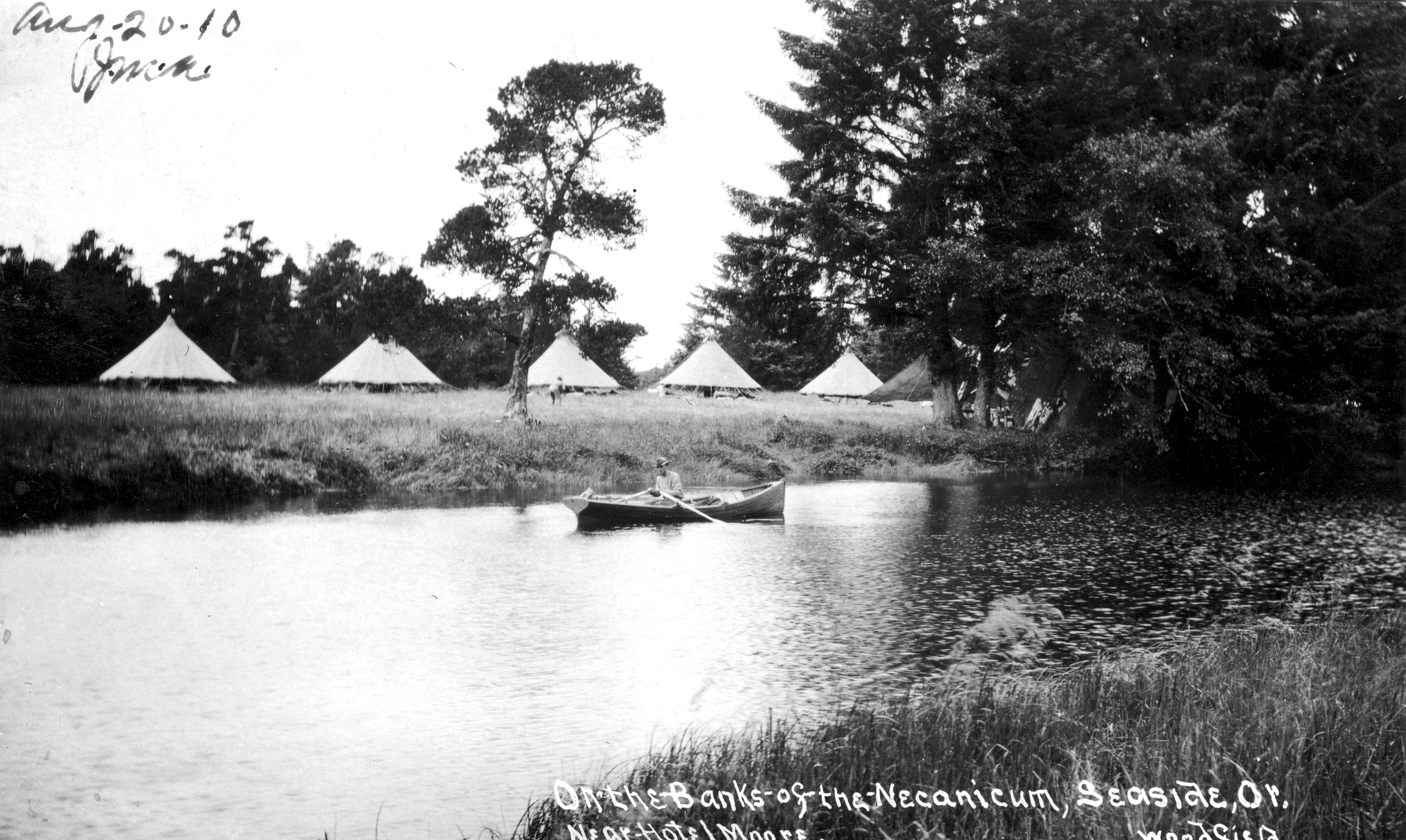
Historic photo: On the banks of the river near Hotel Moore in Seaside
