= Isaac Todd (1811 ship) =

History

United Kingdom
- Name: Isaac Todd
- Namesake: Isaac Todd
- Owner: 1811:John McTavish; 1815:Mount & Co.
- Builder: Québec
- Launched: 1811
- Fate: Wrecked 1821

General characteristics
- Type: Ship
- Tons burthen: 350, or 351 (bm)
- Propulsion: Sail
- Complement: 25
- Armament: 12 × 18&6-pounder cannons; 10 × 18-pounder carronades + 2 × 9-pounder guns

Isaac Todd was built at Québec in 1811 for John McTavish, a partner in the North West Company (NWC). Her mission was to wrest Fort Astoria, at the mouth of the Columbia River, from the American Pacific Fur Company, and thereby destroy the American competition in the fur trade on the Northwest Coast. By the time she arrived there the NWC had purchased the fort, which it renamed Fort George. Isaac Todd then sailed to China where she picked up a cargo of tea for the British East India Company (EIC). She was wrecked in 1821 while carrying cargo and passengers from London to Québec.

== Career ==
Isaac Todd first appears in Lloyd's Register in 1812, with F. Smith, master, M'Tavish & Co, owner, and trade London–Quebec. On her voyage to England she carried Naukane, a Native Hawaiian chief.

Captain Frazer Smith acquired a letter of marque on 4 April 1812.

He sailed Isaac Todd for the Columbia River on 23 March 1813. She sailed via Madeira and Rio de Janeiro, together with HMS Racoon. At Rio they joined up with HMS Phoebe and HMS Cherub. They sailed from Rio on 6 July, sailing around Cape Horn to the Juan Fernandez Islands. Isaac Todd was a slow sailer and did not arrive at the rendezvous in a timely manner.

Racoon therefore sailed on to Fort Astoria while Phoebe and Cherub set off to search for the USS Essex, which was capturing British whalers at the Galapagos Islands and off the Peruvian coast.

Before Racoon arrived at Fort Astoria on 30 November 1813, the North West Company had completed a deal with the Pacific Fur Company that since British ships would be imminently arriving to "take and destroy everything American on the Northwest coast," that they would purchase the assets, for a third of their value. Racoon arrived to find the matter already settled. Still, Commander William Black, captain of Racoon, went through a ceremony of possession. He renamed Fort Astoria to Fort George.

Isaac Todd arrived at Fort Astoria on 23 April 1814. She sailed for China September 26; her voyage represented the first instance of Anglo-Canadian transpacific trade with China.

Captain Joazen Smith sailed Isaac Todd from Whampoa Anchorage on 14 March 1815, bound for England, carrying a cargo of tea for the EIC. She reached the Cape of Good Hope on 17 June and Saint Helena on 17 July. She arrived at The Downs on 19 September.

Some issues of the Register of Shipping show her trade as London-South Seas. However, this appears to be stale data as there is no evidence that she returned to the Pacific.

The Register of Shipping for 1816 shows her master as J. Smith, changing to "Pl_der", her owner as M'Tavish, changing to Mount, and her trade as London–South Seas, changing to London–Barbados.

Isaac Todd underwent a large repair in 1820. The Register of Shipping for 1821 shows her master as Dawson, changing to Threw, her owner as Mount, and her trade as London–Quebec.

== Fate ==
Lloyd's List reported on 6 November 1821 that Isaac Todd, Captain Thew, and two other vessels had wrecked in Gaspee Bay. Isaac Todd was on her way from London to Quebec. The crews were saved.

Isaac Todd had sailed from London on 15 July. On 5 September while she was in a thick fog, a gale developed and drove her onto some rocks. The next day the passengers (who included 12 women, one of whom was 70 years old), reached the shore and using improvised rope ladders that the crew had constructed and hauled up, climbed a 200 ft (61.0 m)-250 ft (76.2 m) cliff. There they camped for two days, sheltering in tents they had made from salvaged sails. Some crew members went in search of help. They found some houses about 10 miles from the wreck site and discovered that they had wrecked at Long Cove.

Isaac Todd was unsalvageable so she was sold for only £90 where she lay . What could be salvaged, some of her rigging, cables, and the like, was then brought to Quebec.
