= James Birnie =

Scottish fir trader in Oregon (1799–1864)

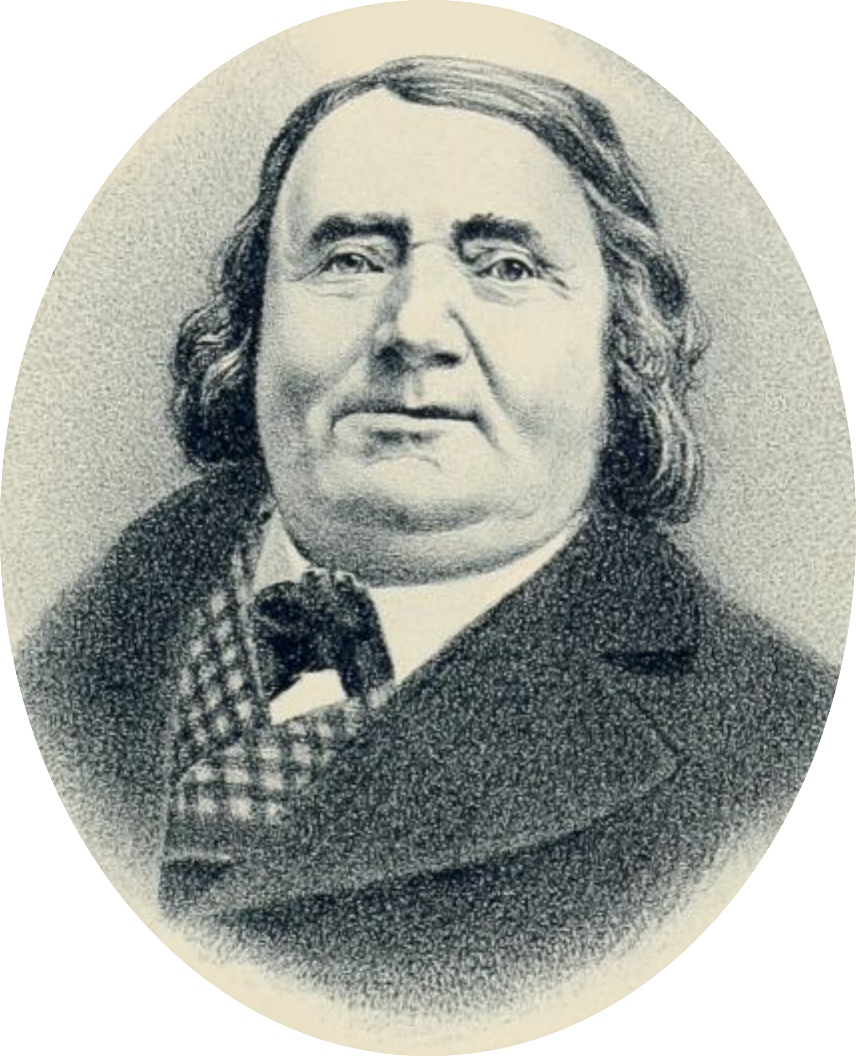
- Born: 1799; Aberdeen, Scotland
- Died: 1849 (aged 49–50); Cathlamet, Washington
- Occupations: Fur trader, clerk
- Spouse: Charlot Beaulieu

James Birnie (1799–1864) was an employee of the North West Company (NWC) and the Hudson's Bay Company (HBC), serving primarily within the Pacific Northwest. With the Oregon Question resolved in 1846, he became the first settler of Cathlamet.

== Early life ==
Birnie was born in Aberdeen, Scotland in 1799, emigrating to Lower Canada at the age of sixteen. At Montreal he joined the North West Company, and was appointed to serve as a junior clerk.

== Pacific Northwest ==
Coat of arms of James Birnie

During his time with the NWC, Birnie was largely stationed at Fort George, the entrepôt and administrative center of the Columbia District on the shoreline of the Columbia River. After the NWC was forcibly amalgamated into the Hudson's Bay Company in 1821, Birnie considered leaving the Pacific Coast. George Simpson convinced him to remain in the employ of the HBC as a clerk, finding his knowledge of the hazardous Columbia Bar of great value to the company. Throughout the 1820s and 1830s, Bernie was a part of several HBC efforts that reorganized the supply infrastructure of the Columbia Department. Notably he oversaw the opening of Fort Colvile, an important station along the developing York Factory Express.

At various points he later managed at various times the Spokane House, the Dalles Post, Fort Okanogan and the relocation effort of Fort Simpson. He returned to Fort George from Fort Simpson in 1836. The following year he was stationed at Fort Umpqua, although in 1838 he was back at Fort George. For the remainder of his service with the HBC, he remained there, acting as a pilot through the Columbia River entrance for incoming vessels. In May 1840, Birnie piloted the Lausanne over the hazardous Columbia Bar. The vessel had incoming Methodists under Jason Lee, recruited to expand the Methodist Missionary efforts among indigenous cultures in the region. Joseph H. Frost was among them and later recorded that Birnie greeted the families with fresh milk and additional refreshments.

Birnie was present at Fort George when United States Navy Lieutenant Charles Wilkes and members of the United States Exploring Expedition arrived. The group had previously sailed from the Kingdom of Hawaii and entered the Puget Sound for surveying of the shorelines. Wilkes proceeded to take a party overland with Cowlitz guides to follow the course of the Cowlitz River until its junction with the Columbia. Wilkes and his party were met by Birnie outside Fort George, despite it being past midnight. The fur trader fed the men and gave each a blanket to sleep with while in his dwelling.

== Later life ==
In 1846 he and his family relocated and became the first settlers of Cathlamet, where he remained with his family until his death in 1864.

== Bibliography ==
- Lee, Daniel; Frost, Joseph H. (1844), Ten Years in Oregon, New York: J. Collard, ISBN 9780598285843
- Watson, Bruce McIntyre (2010). Lives Lived West of the Divide: a Biographical Dictionary of Fur Traders Working West of the Rockies, 1793-1858. Centre for Social, Spatial and Economic Justice, University of British Columbia Okanagan. ISBN 9780981021270. OCLC 531008133.
- Wilkes, Charles (1859), Narrative of the United States Exploring Expedition. During the years 1838, 1839, 1840, 1841, 1842, vol. 4, New York City, NY: G. P. Putnam & Co.
