= Clatsop Mission =

The Clatsop Mission was an outpost of the Methodist Mission near modern Astoria, Oregon, United States. Joseph H. Frost and his family was sent to the Clatsop Plains at the mouth of the Columbia River in 1841. Frustrated at his inability to convert the local Clatsop and Nehalem people, Frost took his family and left the area in August 1843. Josiah Parrish was appointed as his replacement, working at the station until its closure the following year in 1844.

== Establishment ==
Until a residency was complete, Frost and his family resided at Fort George. Frost returned to the Willamette station to request additional members. A fellow missionary Rev. William W. Kone was assigned to accompany him as the planned Umpqua mission had been forfeited. Sailing down the Columbia on a boat loaned from McLoughlin, the Methodists eventually reached the Clatsop Plains. The mission building site was built within the traditional territory of the Clatsop Chinookans. According to Frost, these people "ignorant, superstitious and barbarous."

Events related to the small station were later recalled by Silas B. Smith, who moved to the Clatsop Plains as a child. After being hospitably received by neighboring Clatsops, Silas' father, Solomon Smith, helped efforts in establishing mission buildings. A band of Clatsops provided vital assistance by being "employed to haul and carry the timber for the houses..." in addition to providing food for the missionaries and settlers. A small house was made to house visiting natives who had until then slept on the floor of the main mission building. This was done as outright refusing any guests was feared to possibly lead to a violent confrontation.

== Closure ==
Describing the heads of the Nehalems in the terms of Phrenology, Frost found them to have a "bump of avariciousness being very prominent". The Nehalems practice of head flattening according to the priest likely made this result. In correspondence to the Board in September 1841 Kone stated that Clatsop were "few in number, and not prepared to receive the Gospel." Consequentially he and his family left for the United States in November 1841 due to the "unpromising prospects among the natives..." By February 1842, Frost concluded that "there never will be anything like a permanent Christian church raised up among [the Clatsops]" and decided the budget of the mission "ought to be expended to better purpose elsewhere." Frost was unable to convert any Natives during his time there and left the area with his family on August 14, 1843. His replacement was Rev. Josiah Parrish, who operated the mission until its closure in the following year, whereupon he purchased the property.

== Bibliography ==
- Gatke, Robert M. (1935), "A Document of Mission History, 1833-43", Oregon Historical Quarterly, 36 (1), Oregon Historical Society: 71–94
- Lee, Daniel; Frost, Joseph H. (1844), Ten Years in Oregon, New York: J. Collard, ISBN 9780598285843
- Pipes, Nellie B. (1934a), "Journal of John H. Frost, 1840-43", Oregon Historical Quarterly, 35 (1), Portland, OR: Oregon Historical Society: 50–73
- Pipes, Nellie B. (1934b), "Journal of John H. Frost, 1840-43", Oregon Historical Quarterly, 35 (2), Portland, OR: Oregon Historical Society: 139–167
- Pipes, Nellie B. (1934c), "Journal of John H. Frost, 1840-43", Oregon Historical Quarterly, 35 (3), Portland, OR: Oregon Historical Society: 235–262
- Pipes, Nellie B. (1934d), "Journal of John H. Frost, 1840-43", Oregon Historical Quarterly, 35 (4), Portland, OR: Oregon Historical Society: 348–375
- Smith, Silas B. (1900), "Address of Mr. Silas B. Smith delivered before the Annual Meeting December 16, 1899", Proceedings of the Oregon Historical Society, Salem, OR: W. H. Leeds
