= Raccoon Strait =

Waterway in San Francisco, United States

Coordinates: 37°52′07″N 122°26′45″W

The Raccoon Strait is a waterway of the San Francisco Bay between Angel Island and the Tiburon Peninsula, mainland Marin County, California, United States. During the ice ages, when sea levels were considerably lower and San Francisco Bay was a grassy valley, the combined Sacramento-San Joaquin river flowed through what is now Raccoon Strait before flowing through the canyon at the Golden Gate.

== History ==
From Angel Island California State Park in San Francisco Bay. Ref. California State Parks Angel Island.

In 1814, the British 26-gun sloop of war, HMS Racoon, was damaged off the coast of Oregon, but stayed afloat to reach San Francisco Bay. From March 13 to 19th, the ship was repaired on the beach at Ayala Cove on the Northern portion of Angel Island, at the location of the present day ferry boat dock. This event gave the name to the deep-water channel between Tiburon and Angel Island. It is unclear whether the ship was engaged in the War of 1812 or, more likely, protecting British and Canadian fur traders.

== Geography and Natural history ==
The Spanish, the first European power to control the area, established the village of Tiburon on the north side of the body of water and showed the straits on their charts as the Straits of Tiburon. Tiburon is the Spanish word for shark, named for the subspecies of leopard shark native to San Francisco Bay.

The mainland of the Tiburon Peninsula is dominated by Ring Mountain, which is endowed with considerable archaeological traces of the early Native Americans, who settled the local area. Ring Mountain is also replete with numerous species of native wildflowers. The mainland point of closest distance to the strait is Point Tiburon, off which the water depth is approximately 15 fathoms.
