= Klootchy Creek County Park =

Park in the U.S. state of Oregon

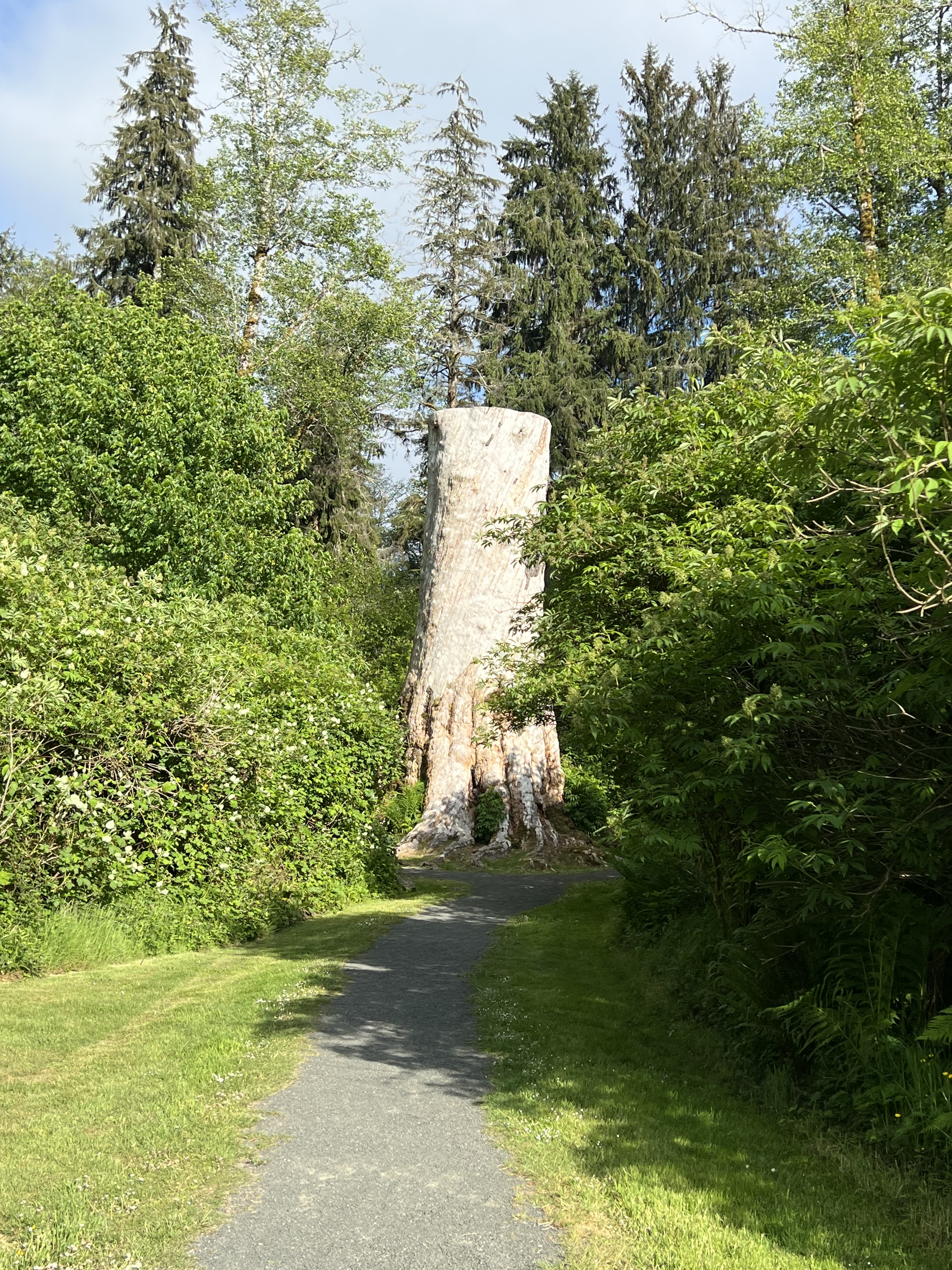
- The park in 2023
- Interactive map of Klootchy Creek County Park
- Location: Clatsop County, Oregon, U.S.
- Nearest city: Seaside, Oregon
- Coordinates: 45.921°N 123.893°W
- Area: 25 acres (10 ha)

The Klootchy Creek County Park, or Klootchy Creek Park, is a park in Clatsop County, Oregon, U.S. The park provides access to the Necanicum River and a mountain bike trail system, and is the site of formerly the largest tree in the state, a Sitka spruce. It once was the largest Sitka spruce in the United States, the largest tree in Oregon, and one of the oldest living things in the state. On December 2, 2007, the Great Coastal Gale of 2007 snapped the tree about 80 feet above ground. Before the storm, it was 200 feet tall, its diameter was 17 feet, its circumference was 673 inches, and its crown spread was 93 feet. It was estimated to be 500–700 years old and was designated the first Oregon Heritage Tree. In February 2011, the parks department had a further 40 feet or so of the remaining snag cut off, due to concerns about decaying wood falling from the trunk and putting visitors at risk.
