= Cullaby Lake =

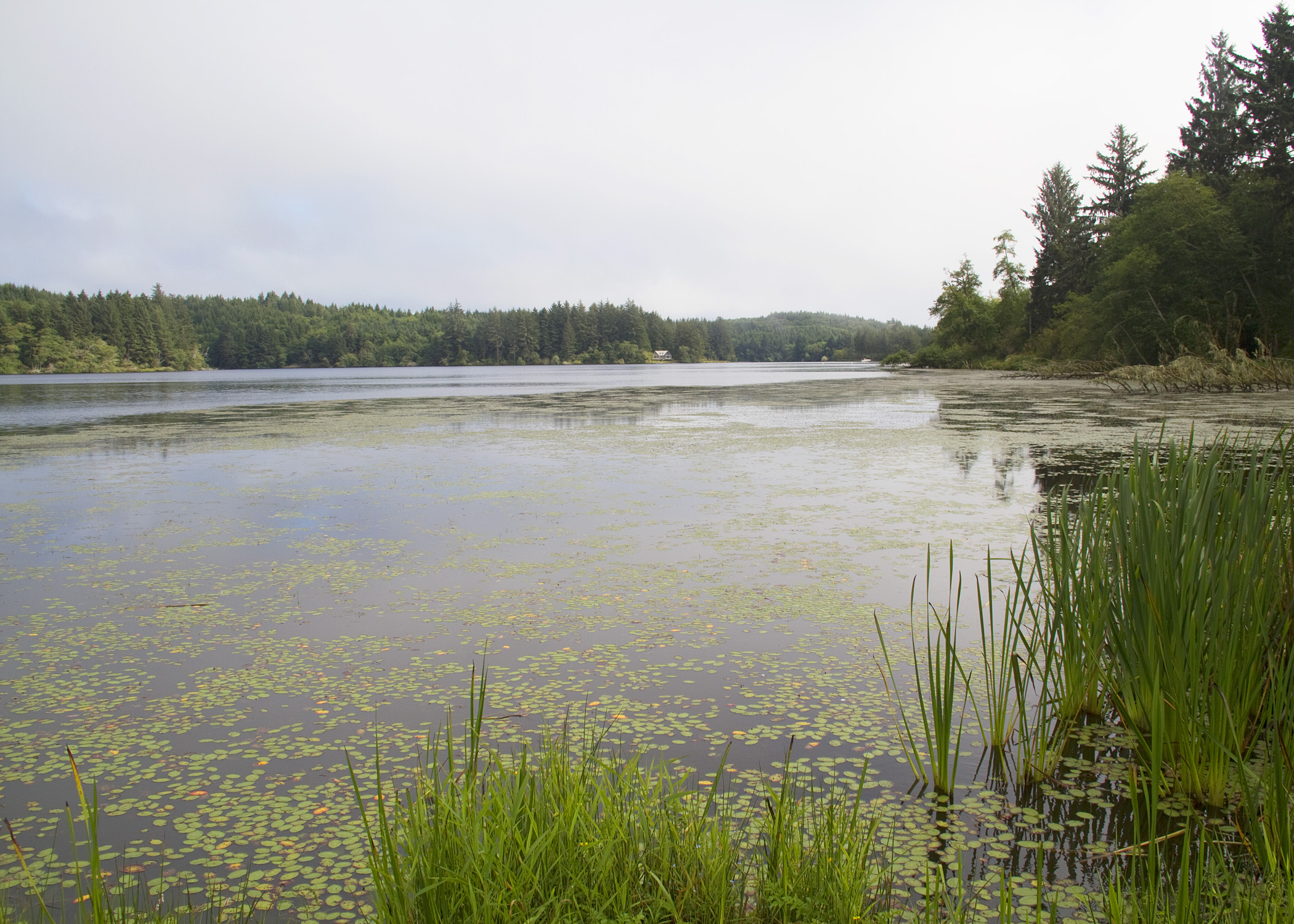
- Cullaby Lake in 2013

- Location within Oregon
- Location: Clatsop County, Oregon
- Coordinates: 46.084°N 123.903°W
- Type: lake

Cullaby Lake is a lake near Warrenton, Oregon, United States. It is the central feature of Cullaby Lake County Park, and one of the major lakes of Clatsop Plains.

Cullaby Lake's main water inflow is Cullaby Creek which flows in from the south and drains the coastal hills to the east of Clatsop Plains, Gearhart and Seaside. It has been the headwaters of the Skipanon River since the construction of the Carnahan Ditch in the 1800s, before this, the lake drained to the south via Neacoxie Creek into the Necanicum River north of Seaside.

The park contains a boat ramp for the lake.
