= Naukane =

Hawaiian chief

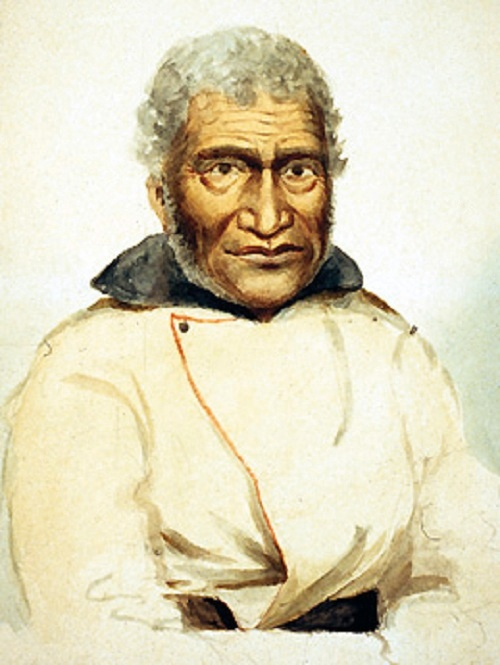
Portrait of Naukane, 1847, by Paul Kane.

Naukane (c. 1779 – February 2, 1850), also known as John Coxe, Edward Cox, and Coxe was a Native Hawaiian chief who traveled widely through North America in the early 19th century. He was either considered a member of the royal household of Kamehameha I or a chiefly retainer, possibly the same person as Noukana, the son of High Chief Kamanawa, the King's uncle and trusted advisor.

== Life ==
In 1811, the Tonquin, belonging to the American Pacific Fur Company (PFC), stopped on Oahu and recruited twenty Hawaiians to work as labourers (known as kanakas) in the Pacific Northwest. King Kamehameha I appointed Naukane to join the group and look after the interests of Hawaiian laborers.

On the voyage to Fort Astoria on the Columbia River, Naukane was given the name John Coxe, because he resembled a shipmate on the Tonquin.

Soon after Naukane arrived at Fort Astoria, David Thompson of the Montreal-based North West Company (NWC) also arrived. In July 1811, Thompson and a group of Astorians began to journey up the Columbia River. The two parties traveled together until they reached the Columbia Gorge, after which Thompson went on ahead. Before parting ways, there was an exchange of some of the workers. Thompson allowed his employee Michel Boulard to join the Pacific Fur Company in exchange for Naukane, who Thompson referred to as Coxe. Boulard was a 40-year-old voyageur who had worked with Thompson off and on for the previous eleven years. Boulard, although weaker with age, was useful to the Astorians for his great knowledge of geography and native affairs. In contrast, Naukane was valuable to Thompson for his great strength. Naukane traveled with Thompson as far as Spokane House. There, he was left with Jaco Finlay while Thompson continued rapidly on. Soon Naukane was traveling east as well, crossing the continent to Fort William (today's Thunder Bay, Ontario) on Lake Superior. From there, he traveled by water to Quebec. In 1812, the ship Isaac Todd took him to England. In 1813, he returned to the Pacific Northwest on HMS Racoon.

After the demise of the Pacific Fur Company during the War of 1812, Naukane returned to the Hawaiian Islands in 1815. He soon returned to the Pacific Northwest as an employee of the North West Company. He worked as a labourer at Fort George (the name of Fort Astoria under the NWC). When the company was merged into the Hudson's Bay Company (HBC) in 1821, Naukane remained at Fort George as an HBC employee. In 1823 he was sent with King Kamehameha II to England to visit King George IV. He spent most of the rest of his life near Fort Vancouver, working for the HBC. He had a wife in 1825 and appears to have had a Native slave, Marie, whom he likely inherited through a previous Native wife. He appears to have retired in 1843 or 1844 and probably continued to live in Kanaka Village at Fort Vancouver. He died on February 2, 1850, at Fort Vancouver.
