= Fort Astoria =

Primary fur trading post of the Pacific Fur Company

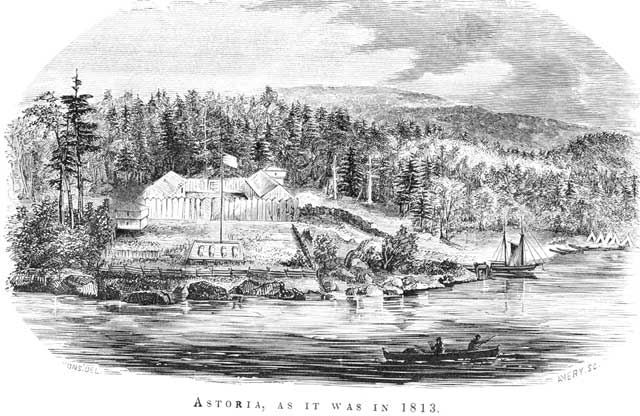
- The trading post as it was in 1813.
- Interactive map of Fort Astoria
- Type: Fur trade post
- Location: Astoria, Oregon

History
- Constructed: 1811
- Built for: Pacific Fur Company
- Abandoned: Unknown

Site notes
- Owner: Pacific Fur Company (orig.); Hudson's Bay Company (later)
- Fort Astoria
- U.S. National Register of Historic Places
- U.S. National Historic Landmark
- U.S. Historic district – Contributing property
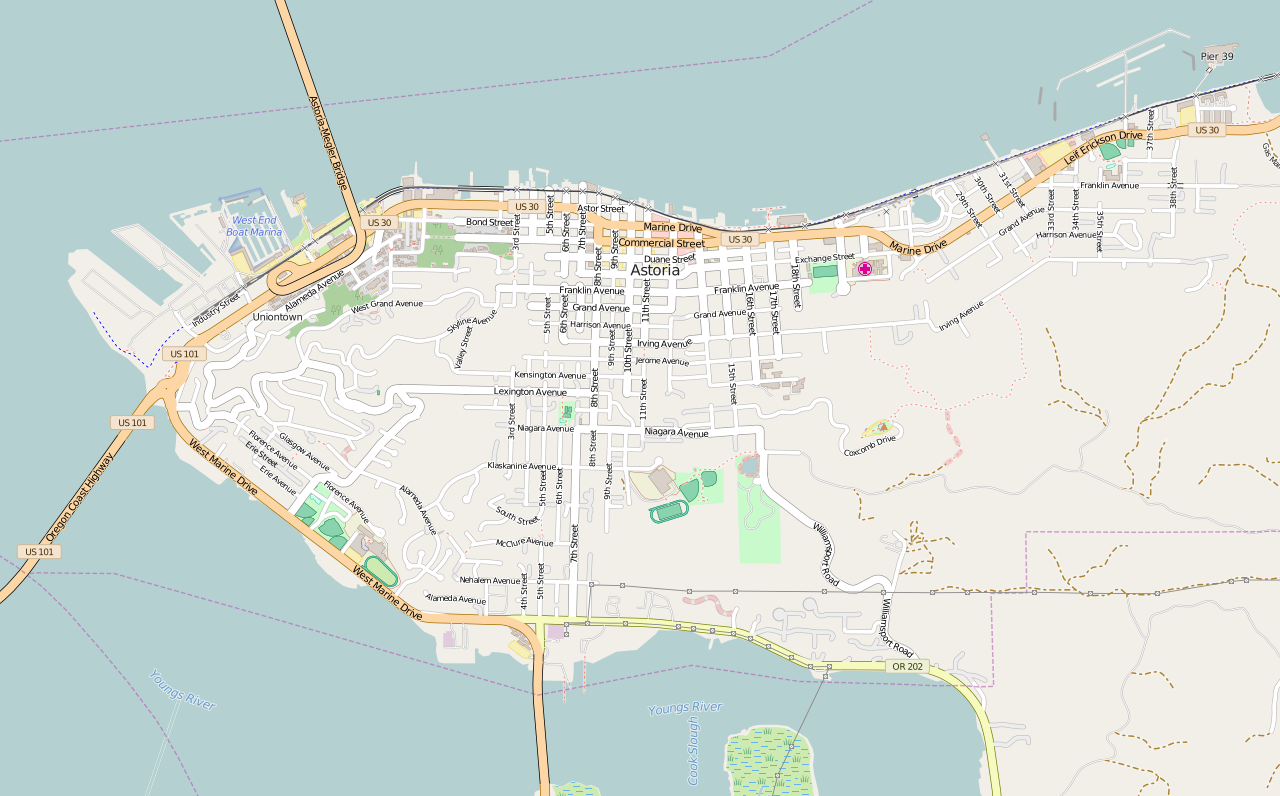
- Location within Astoria OR
- Location: Astoria, Oregon
- Coordinates: 46°11′18″N 123°49′39″W
- Built: 1811
- Part of: Astoria Downtown Historic District (ID98000631)
- NRHP reference No.: 66000639

Significant dates
- Added to NRHP: October 15, 1966
- Designated NHL: November 5, 1961

Fort Astoria (also named Fort George) was the primary fur trading post of John Jacob Astor's Pacific Fur Company (PFC). A maritime contingent of PFC staff was sent on board the Tonquin, while another party traveled overland from St. Louis. This land based group later became known as the Astor Expedition. Built at the entrance of the Columbia River in 1811, Fort Astoria was the first American-owned settlement on the Pacific coast of North America.

The inhabitants of the fort differed greatly in background and position, and were structured into a corporate hierarchy. The fur trading partners of the company were at the top, with clerks, craftsmen, hunters, and laborers in descending order. Nationalities included Americans, Scots, French Canadian voyageurs, Native Hawaiian, Kanakas, and various indigenous North Americans, including Iroquois and others from Eastern Canada. They found life quite monotonous, with the fish and vegetable diet boring. Venereal diseases were problematic. Types of fur taken in trade at the fort included beaver, sea otter, squirrel, and red fox.

The onset of the War of 1812 caused the PFC to fold as it was too isolated to expect any military protection or support from the United States. The Montreal-based North West Company (NWC) bought out the assets of the PFC in 1813, including Fort Astoria. They renamed it Fort George and utilized it as the headquarters of its most western operations, primarily based along the Columbia. In 1821, the Hudson's Bay Company incorporated Fort George into its collection of posts after absorbing the NWC. The opening of Fort Vancouver in 1825 was planned to allow for a better placed headquarters for the Columbia Department. While Fort George was abandoned in 1825, the arrival of American naval merchants on the Columbia necessitated the reopening of Fort George by the HBC.

Competition for control of Fort Astoria was a factor in the British and the Americans' resolving their disputed claims to the Oregon Country.

The Fort Astoria Site was added to the list of National Historic Landmarks on November 5, 1961. It is marked by a reconstructed block house.

== Background ==
John Jacob Astor was a German American merchant who over several decades financed several successful mercantile missions to Qing China. He promoted the idea of a joint company with the Canadian North West Company to open trade posts in the Pacific Northwest. However, Astor was unable to convince the British subjects to join him in such a venture. This did not deter the ambitious financier, who went ahead with his plans by creating the American Fur Company (AFC) in 1808.

The Pacific Fur Company was established shortly afterwards as an AFC subsidiary to establish commercial stations on the Pacific Coast. Notably Astor was able to recruit several NWC partners and employees into the PFC, including Donald McKenzie, Alexander MacKay, and Duncan McDougall. To create these new fur trade locations, Astor planned to send detachments of laborers and officers both overland on a route similar to one taken by the Lewis and Clark Expedition and on merchant vessels that rounded Cape Horn for the Columbia.

The Tonquin was used to carry a detachment of employees to the Pacific under the command of Captain Jonathan Thorn. After several days were spent surveying the mouth of the Columbia River, 33 men disembarked on 12 April 1811. Among the PFC men were eleven Kanaka laborers from the Hawaiian Kingdom, including Naukane (also known as John Coxe). Notable among the early staff of Fort Astoria were two Scottish emigrants to Canada, Alexander MacKay, who had previously been with the North West Company, and Alexander Ross.

== Operations ==
=== Construction ===
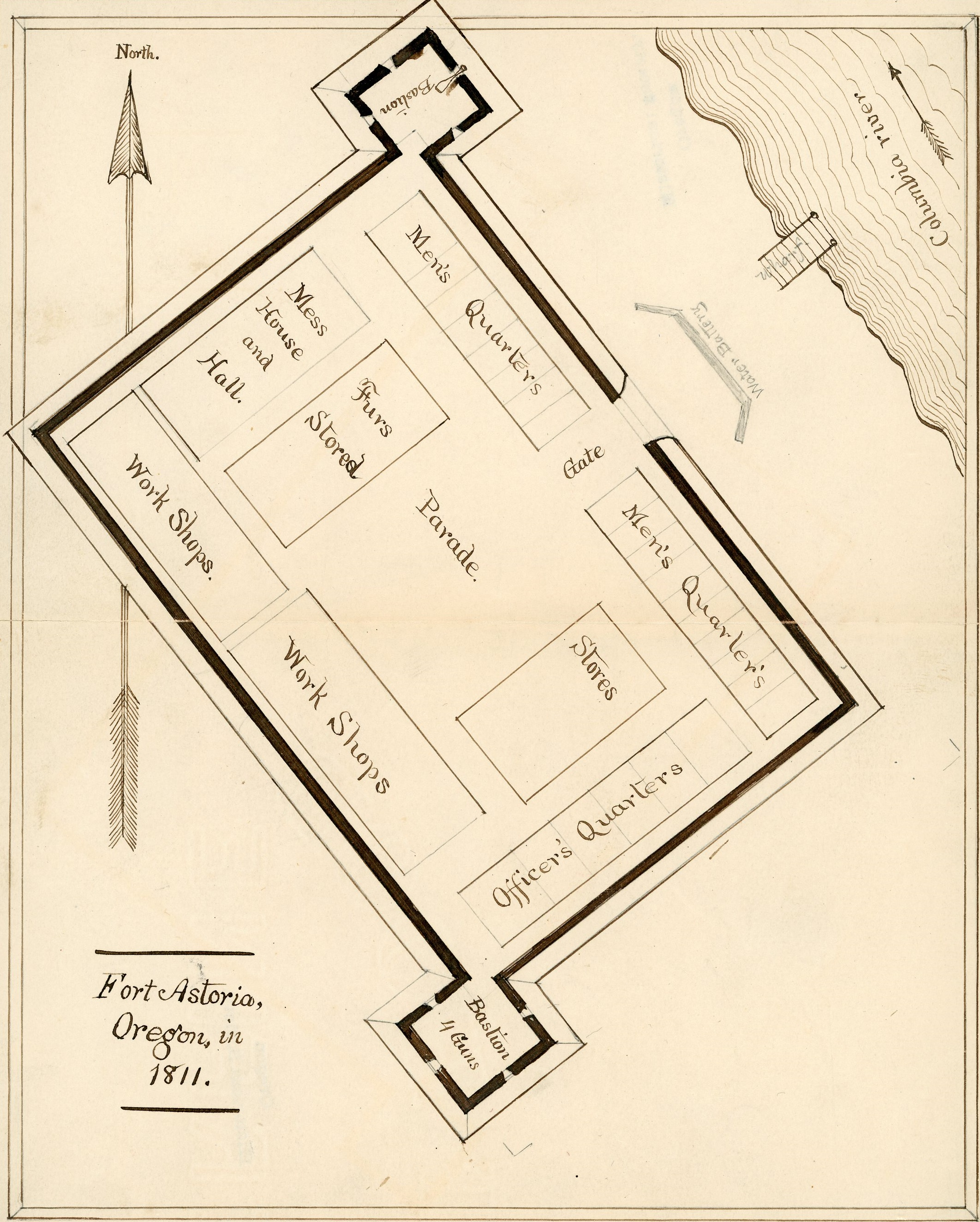
The layout of Fort Astoria in 1811.

By the end of May 1811, company employees built Fort Astoria out of bark-covered logs that enclosed a stockade and guns mounted for defense. Ross recalled that in almost two months, "scarcely yet an acre of ground cleared" due to the many initial difficulties the PFC employees faced in establishing Fort Astoria:

The place thus selected for the emporium of the west, might challenge the whole continent to produce a spot of equal extent presenting more difficulties to the settler: studded with many gigantic trees of almost incredible size, many of them measuring fifty feet in girth, and so close together, and intermingled with huge rocks, as to make it work of no ordinary labour to level and clear the ground.

By the time an overland party joined them in February 1812, the PFC laborers had constructed a trading store, a blacksmith's shop, a house, and a storage shed for pelts acquired from trapping or trading with the local Native Americans. The traders arranged cannons around the perimeter for defense. The post was to serve as an administrative center for various PFC satellite forts such as Fort Okanogan.

=== Activities ===
On June 15, 1811, two unusual native visitors arrived: the two-spirit Kaúxuma Núpika (known in English as Man-like Woman or Bowdash, which is derived from the Chinook Jargon burdash) and their wife, both of the Kootenai from the far interior. PFC management suspected the two of being spies for the NWC, but at the same time welcomed their detailed geographical knowledge. A NWC employee, David Thompson, arrived about a month later after navigating the entire length of the Columbia River. Thompson knew the Kootenai couple and told the Astorians about Kaúxuma Núpika and their unusual life. Both the Astorians and Thompson's party ended up protecting the life of Kaúxuma Núpika, whose prophecies of smallpox among the local natives put his life at risk.

Thompson, who for months had been out of touch with the evolving politics between the fur companies, believed that the NWC held a one-third partnership with Astor's Pacific Fur Company. He carried a letter to the effect. The Astorians knew that the deal had fallen through but dealt with Thompson as if the deal were still on. The journals of Thompson and the Astorians are silent on the matter, yet both parties took steps to mislead or thwart the other, while at the same time remaining on friendly terms. It is likely that in this remote region, neither party knew for certain whether the two companies were to be allies or competitors.

In June 1812, the number of men at Fort Astoria were reduced to 11 Hawaiians and 39 European descendants. Fear of attack by Chinookans was high and drills were directed by McDougall frequently. A delegation of Chinookans visited Fort Astoria on 2 July quickly left after witnessing these military demonstrations. This fear by the natives convinced the Astorians that "they are not friendly disposed towards us..." having "a desire to harm us." According to Jones, this "latent distrust" of Chinookans by Astorians from this incident was probably unfounded, as they entered the post "for an innocent purpose" and were frightened by the drills.

=== Tonquin ===
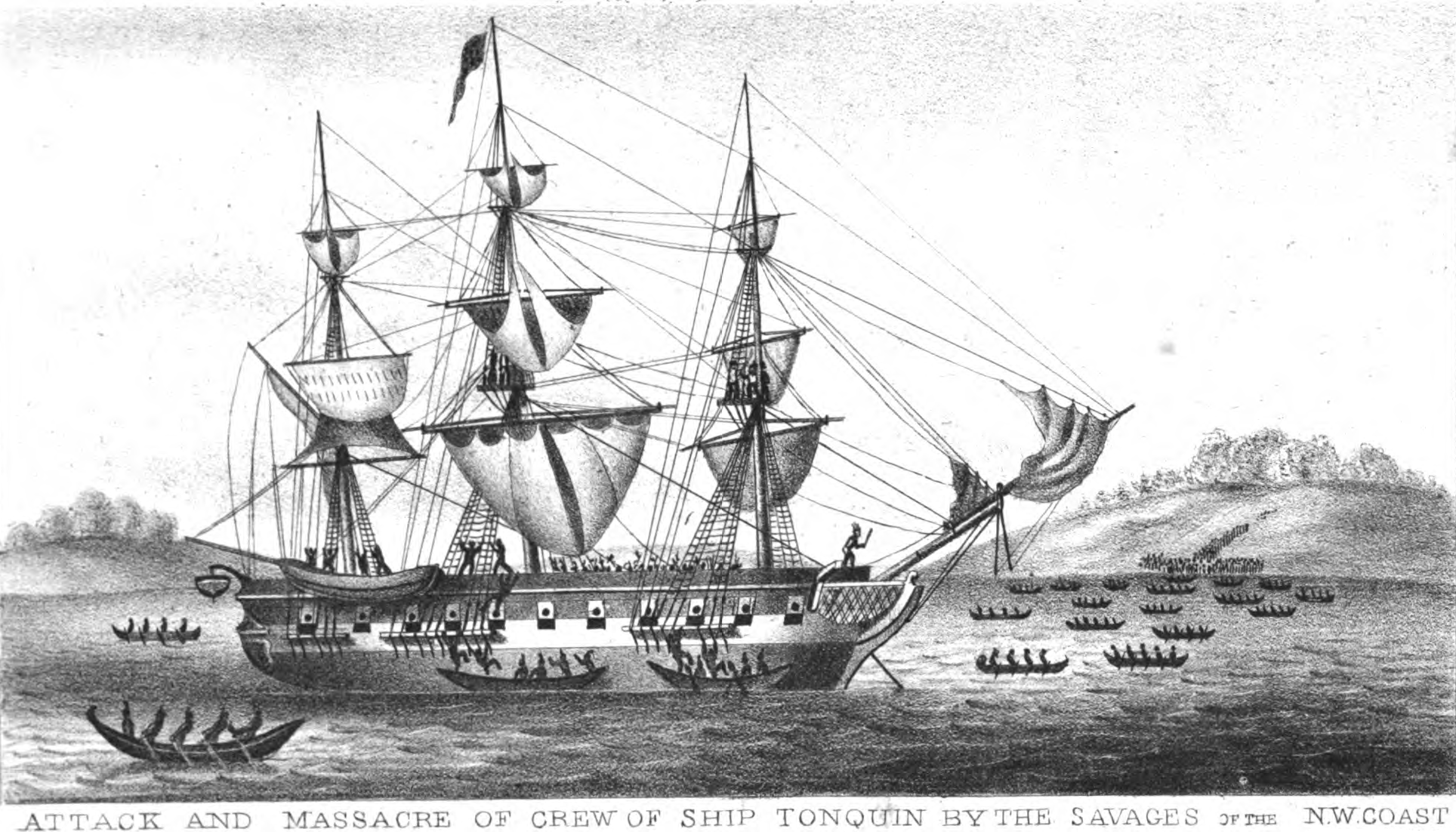
Late in 1811 Tonquin was destroyed off the coast of Vancouver Island. The loss of the vessel created a shortage of provisions at Fort Astoria until Beaver arrived the following year in 1812.

Acting on the orders of Astor, Thorn and Tonquin departed for Russian America in June 1811. At Destruction Island a Quinault man with familial ties to Vancouver Island, Joseachal, was hired to serve as a translator. While at Clayoquot Sound off Vancouver Island, Thorn became frustrated with the prices set by the local Tla-o-qui-aht people there. He reportedly took an animal pelt and struck the elder appointed as the primary negotiator. This greatly offended the Tla-o-qui-aht, and while Joseachal advised Thorn of the danger, the captain refused to immediately depart.

Eventually a brisk trade commenced with the locals who had remained on board, with the pelts being sold primarily for American blades. Soon after receiving the weapons the Tla-o-qui-aht attacked and in the ensuing conflict Tonquin was destroyed. Josechal was the sole survivor and later returned to Fort Astoria to inform McDougall of the fate of the vessel. The loss of Tonquin caused a great deal of hardship for the personnel at Fort Astoria as it still held a large amount of the trade goods and foodstuffs intended for trade in the region.

=== First winter (1811–1812) ===
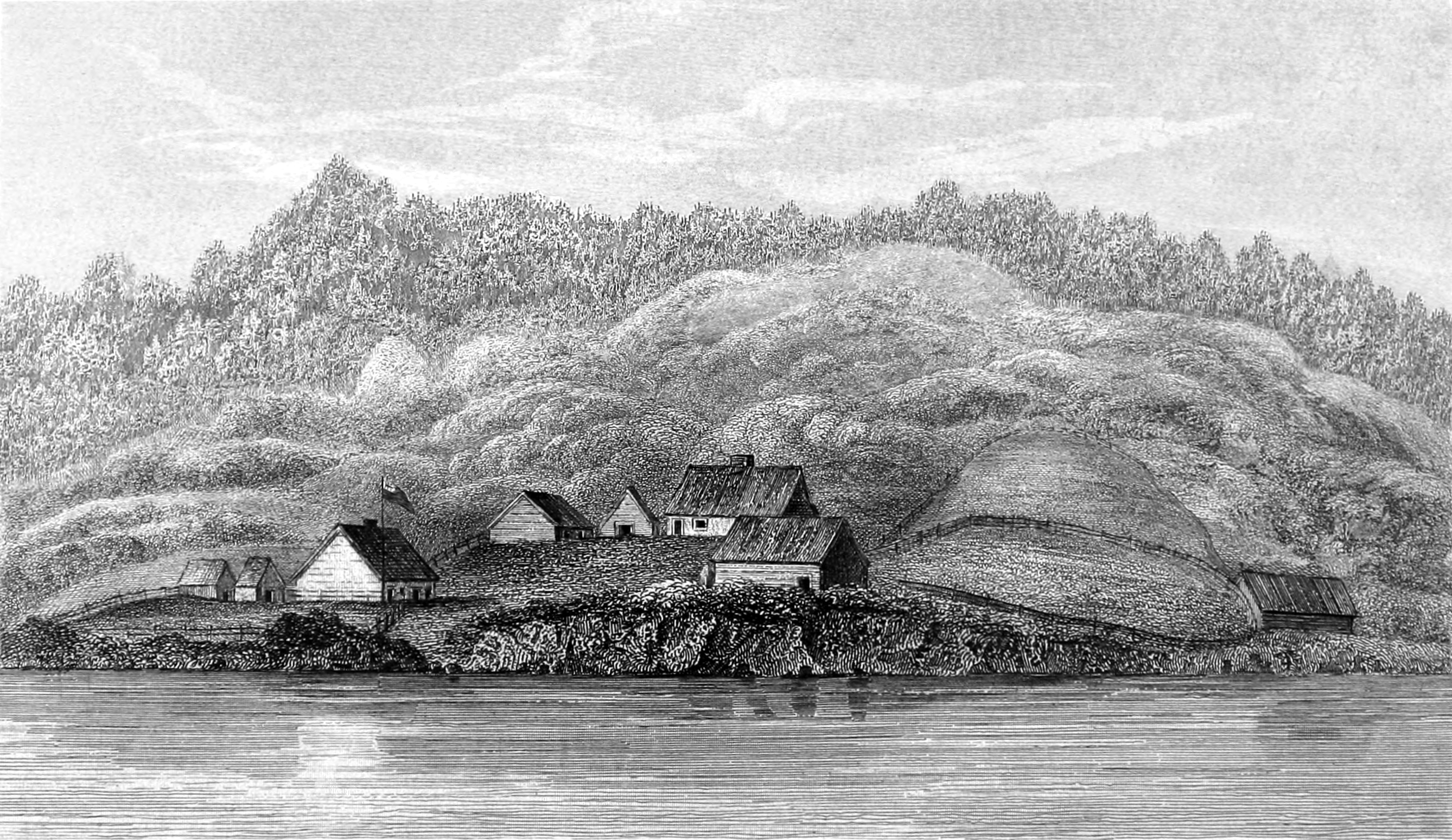
An engraving of Fort George, Astoria from the publication Narrative of a Voyage around the World (1843)

Many Tonquin passengers and crew members listed in Gabriel Franchère comprehensive travel log did not get to winter over after the initial fort was built, due to either being lost (deserting), drowning or perishing in the June 1811 Tonquin disaster (aside a single Indigenous interpreter survivor). New Kanaka passengers had also been added during the stopover on the Sandwich Islands and similarly, some did not winter over. One Kanaka was exchanged for an experienced voyageur that came with David Thompson during the summer before he returned. Two additions came during fall 1811 following an expedition to establish Fort Okanogan. Some members of that expedition did return by January 1812 along with the first arrivals of the Wilson Price Hunt overland expedition. The first "Astorians" to operate the fort during the first winter of 1811–1812 were:

- Tonquin remaining passengers and crew members: George Bell, Antoine Belleau, Jean Baptiste Belleau, Russel Farnham, Gabriel Franchère, Paul Jérémie, Joseph Lapierre, Jacques Lafantaisie, Michel Laframboise, Olivier Roy Lapensée, Gilles Leclerc, William W. Matthews, Duncan McDougall, Donald McGillis, Thomas McKay, Donald McLennan, Ovide de Montigny, John M. Mumford, William (Guillaume) Perrault, Francis Benjamin Pillet, Alexander Ross, Augustus (Augustin) Roussil, Benjamin Roussel, David Stuart, Robert Stuart, William Wallace, and Henry Weeks.
- Kanaka additions: Harry, William Karimou, James Keemo, George Naaco, Dick Paow, Peter Pahia, Paul Pooar, Bob Pookarakara, Jack Powrowrie, and Thomas Tuana.
- Fall 1811 additions: Michel Boulard (in lieu of departing Kanaka Naukane alias John Coxe in June 1811 upon David Thompson return).
- Other 1811 Métis, Indigenous, and Iroquois additions: Régis Bruguier, Joseachal Shonowane, and Ignace Shonowane.
- January 1812 additions: First "Astorian overlanders" Reed party from the Wilson Price Hunt expedition - William Cannon, André Dufresne, Prisque Felax, Joseph Landry, Guillaume Leroux (dit Cardinal), Étienne Lucier, Donald McKenzie, Robert McLelland, John Reed, Michel Samson, and André Vallée.

Although based in Fort Astoria, Ross, de Montigny, Roussel, and Lafantaisie all wintered over around new Fort Okanogan. Robert Stuart, Pillet, McGillis, and Bruguier wintered around the Willamette River.

=== Beaver ===
Astor sent Beaver to resupply the fort which arrived in 1812. Besides additional American and British subjects, a further 26 Hawaiian Kanakas were transported to bolster the company workforce. From there the Beaver took the stockpiled animal pelts at Astoria on board and sailed for New Archangel. An agreement with the Russian American Governor, Alexander Andreyevich Baranov, was made for the exchange of foodstuffs and trade goods in return for Russian furs. From there Beaver sailed to the Chinese port of Guangzhou to sell the furs for highly valuable Chinese manufactured goods. Due to then ongoing War of 1812, Beaver remained at Guangzhou until the resolution of the conflict and only reached New York City in 1816.

=== War of 1812 ===
The War of 1812 between the British and Americans brought tension to Fort Astoria, though not as a result of hostilities between the fur companies. On 1 July 1813, the fort officers of Donald Mackenzie, Duncan McDougall, David Stuart, and John Clarke, desiring to abandon the fort agreed to sell the PFC trading stations to the British-owned NWC, "unless the necessary support and supplies arrive with advice from John Jacob Astor of New York, or the Stockholders to continue the trade, the same shall be abandoned as impracticable, as well as unprofitable." NWC staff arrived at the coast after running low on food supplies in the Interior on 7 October, with the liquidation of the PFC assets being executed on 23 October.

HMS Racoon, a British sloop-of-war, visited Fort Astoria on 12 December 1813, previously instructed to claim the station as a British possession. Its captain William Black found the trading station far from militarily imposing, reportedly exclaiming "Is this the fort about which I have heard so much talking? Damn me, but I'd batter it down in two hours with a four pounder!"

Unable to seize the fort, as it had been purchased by British subjects, Black ordered the Union Jack removed and replaced with the Stars and Stripes. He then dramatically exchanged the flags again and claimed it in the name of the British Crown. Black renamed the post Fort George in honor of King George III.

As the post had been seized by Captain Black, it was returned to the United States under the terms of the Treaty of Ghent.

== Relations with Lower Chinookan peoples ==
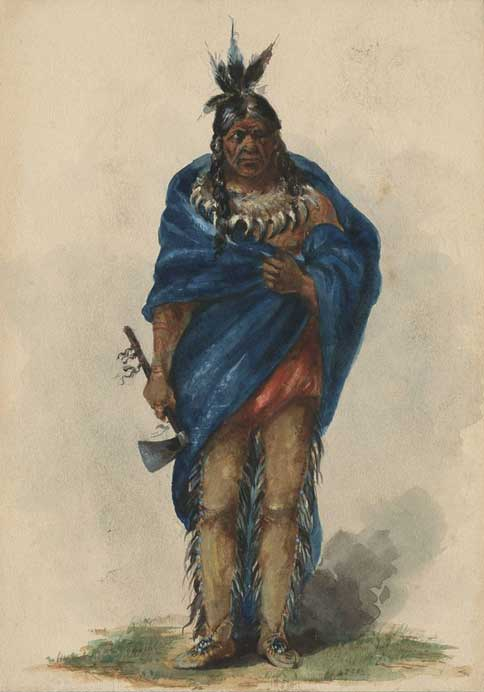
Comcomly's mercantile skills as an intermediary gained him significant profits in deals with Fort Astoria. In particular he controlled the sale of many of the pelts originating from the Chinookan, Chehalis and Quinault nations.

Scholars have affirmed that the American company and its "economic success depended on mutually beneficial economic exchanges with Indian groups... who controlled trade." Many of the settlements near the station were under the influence of headman Comcomly. Consistently small stockpiles of foodstuffs at Fort Astoria created the need for frequent transactions with Chinookans for sustenance. Seasonal fish runs provided the major nutritional sources for the Columbian River based Natives. Major fish populations active in the Columbia included the candlefish smelt, white sturgeon, sockeye salmon, coho salmon, and Chinook salmon. This dependence on fish made it a primary food source for the Astorians, which caused some discontent among employees desiring a more familiar diet.

Terrestrial animals like members of the family Cervidae such as Roosevelt elk and black-tailed deer were not found in large numbers around Fort Astoria. This made them another important source of trade for the Chinookans when visiting the PFC station. Another frequent item sold was the wapato root, with the volume consumed by the Astorians large enough to necessitate the creation of a small cellar made specifically to house the produce. Other typical purchases from Chinookans included manufactured goods. In particular woven hats were frequently bought for protection against the seasonal rains These hats were tightly interwoven, making them essentially waterproof.

== British fur companies ==
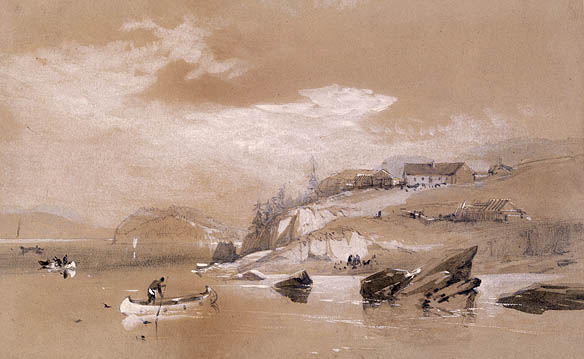
A watercolor painting of Fort George in 1845.

Fort George soon became the center of NWC operations along the Columbia River, becoming "a Fort William in miniature." At the time the NWC had no competition for the land-based fur trade in the region. NWC laborers developed Fort George by expanding its agricultural fields, in addition to creating "several large buildings erected, and the pallisades [sic] and bastions strengthened." Fort George became an important port-of-call for the maritime fur trade. By 1818, there about 50 NWC employees at Fort George, over half being Hawaiian Kanakas.

In 1821, the North West Company was merged into the Hudson's Bay Company, which took ownership of the fort. Fort George continued to function the primary entrepôt of the Columbia Department until 1825. During a tour of the newly acquired assets on the Pacific shore, Governor George Simpson spent the winter of 1824 at Fort George. He found the station inappropriate both as a fur post and a regional depot. Simpson ordered the establishment of a new post and depot further in the interior along the Columbia River. A suitable prairie was selected by the Governor as having much more for agricultural projects. Besides his intention for this new post to supply foodstuffs for company stations in the Pacific Northwest, Simpson determined to relocate the Columbia Department administrative apparatus there as well. This new station was christened Fort Vancouver, with the initial construction completed in the spring of 1825. HBC personnel withdrew from Fort George two months later. Neighboring native villagers began to seasonally reside there, "rapidly reducing it to a state of ruin & filth." A small number of lodges, likely maintained by the Clatsop, were established fairly close to Fort George.

To counter Americans merchant vessels, a reoccupation of Fort George by the HBC was ordered in 1829. The post was placed at the forefront of competition between the British and American fur traders. While the post was gradually rebuilt, the dilapidated condition and extensive repairs required forced the sole clerk to live in a tent during the winter. The residency of the HBC trader was made to be 20 feet (6.1 m) wide by 60 feet (18 m) long. Along with two minor buildings, there was a small warehouse. While ordering a lowering of exchange rates for skins in 1829, Chief Factor John McLoughlin focused on maintaining commercial ties with the Chinookan peoples through "forcing our Competitors to reduce their prices." This continued value placed in the Chinookans by the British subjects went extended beyond a major source of fur pelts. For instance, the surrounding tribes of Fort George were frequently employed to man the post canoes.

The sinking of such HBC ships as the William and Ann at the mouth of the Columbia necessitated the use of the trading post to guide ships inland. Beginning in 1830 the location was continuously used in a small capacity by the company. The Isabella, a HBC trading ship, crashed near the station during that year. Neighboring Clatsops appeared on the scene, offering to recover property from the ship. Despite Chief Factor McLoughlin lamenting that "we have no alternative but to run the risk or lose the property", the assistance tendered by them proved invaluable for the company.

In 1833, the post had a staff of four: an English clerk, a Scottish field manager from Stromness, and two Hawaiians. Throughout the 1830s and 1840s, several men served as Fort George's managing officer with James Birnie serving the longest. The Methodist missionary Daniel Lee reported that Birnie maintained "abundant crops of most excellent potatoes and garden vegetables" at the post. The growing salmon harvesting operations of the Hudson's Bay Company were focused on the fisheries surrounding Fort George. The company used the salmon to feed its employees, as well as exporting some to the markets of the Hawaiian Kingdom.

== Role in Oregon Question ==
The USS Ontario was dispatched in 1817 to reassert the American claim to Fort Astoria, though ordered to avoid an armed confrontation. NWC partner Simon McGillivray dramatically claimed that the vessel was sent "to seize or destroy the establishments and trade of the North West Company..." The NWC partners had already instructed its staff at Fort George to not resist an attempt by Americans to reclaim the fur trading station. Despite the ceremony of formally transferring national possession, actual ownership by the NWC went on as before, and no actual American presence was established aside from the symbolic repossession.

The negotiations that would formally end the War of 1812 briefly touched upon the topic of Fort Astoria/George. The American government exerted pressure for the return of the station from British subjects. British Foreign Secretary Viscount Castlereagh determined a conciliatory policy. In a letter to Charles Bagot on 4 February 1818, Castlereagh stated that "whilst the Government is not disposed to contest with the American govt't the point of possession as it stood in the Columbia River at the moment of the rupture, they are not prepared to admit the validity of the title of the Govt of the United States to this Settlement." Ultimately the Treaty of 1818 established a "joint occupancy" of the Pacific Northwest between the United Kingdom and the United States. This accord allowed for subjects from either nation to travel to the distant region without hindrance.

In 1846, the post finally became United States territory as one of the terms of the Oregon Treaty, which ended the Oregon boundary dispute. In the treaty, Great Britain ceded its territorial rights south of the 49th parallel. As the treaty would have subjected the Hudson's Bay Company to American jurisdiction, the company opted to sell off its possessions south of the 49th parallel, despite the fact that the treaty had specifically guaranteed their right to retain such properties.

== Bibliography ==
=== Primary sources ===
- Elliott, T. C. (1932), "Sale of Astoria, 1813", Oregon Historical Quarterly, 33 (1), Oregon Historical Society: 43–50
- Franchère, Gabriel (1854), Narrative of a voyage to the Northwest coast of America, in the years 1811, 1812, 1813, and 1814, translated by Huntington, J. V., New York City: Redfield
- Lee, Daniel; Frost, Joseph H. (1844), Ten Years in Oregon, New York: J. Collard, ISBN 9780598285843
- McDougall, Duncan (1999), Robert F. Jones (ed.), Annals of Astoria: The Headquarters Log of the Pacific Fur Company on the Columbia River, 1811-1813, New York City: Fordham University Press
- McLoughlin, John (1948), Barker, Burt Brown (ed.), Letters of Dr. John McLoughlin, written at Fort Vancouver 1829-1832, Portland, OR: Binfords & Mort
- Ross, Alexander (1849), Adventures of the first settlers on the Oregon or Columbia River, London: Smith, Elder & Co., ISBN 9780598286024
- Scouler, John (1905), "Dr. John Scouler's Journal of a Voyage to N. W. America. Columbia, Vancouver, & Nootka Sound", The Quarterly of the Oregon Historical Society, 6 (3), Oregon Historical Society: 54–75, JSTOR 20609656
- Tolmie, William Fraser (1963), The Journals of William Fraser Tolmie: Physician and Trader, Vancouver, B.C.: Mitchell Press Limited
- Franchère, Gabriel (1969), Lamb, William (ed.), Journal of a Voyage on the North West Coast of North America during the Years 1811, 1812, 1813 and 1814, Toronto, Ontario: Champlain Society Publications, doi:10.3138/9781442618039, ISBN 978-1-4426-1803-9

=== Secondary sources ===
- Begg, Alexaner (1894), History of British Columbia from its earliest discovery to the present time, Toronto: William Briggs, archived from the original on March 5, 2016
- Boyd, Robert T.; Ames, Kenneth A.; Johnson, Tony A. (2015), Chinookan Peoples of the Lower Columbia, Seattle: University of Washington Press, ISBN 9780295995236
- Carey, Charles Henry (1922), History of Oregon, The Pioneer Historical Publishing Company
- Chittenden, Hiram M. (1902), The American Fur Trade in the Far West, vol. 1, New York City: Francis P. Harper
- Galbraith, John S. (1957), The Hudson's Bay Company as an Imperial Factor, 1821-1869, Toronto: University of Toronto Press
- Jones, Robert F. (1997), "The Identity of the Tonquin's Interpreter", Oregon Historical Quarterly, 98 (3), Oregon Historical Society: 296–314
- Judson, Katherine B. (1919), "British Side of the Restoration of Fort Astoria-II (continued)", The Quarterly of the Oregon Historical Society, 20 (4), Oregon Historical Society: 305–330
- Koppel, Tom (1995), McLean, Elizabeth (ed.), Kanaka: The Untold Story of Hawaiian Pioneers in British Columbia and the Pacific Northwest, Vancouver, B.C.: Whitecap Books
- Mackie, Richard Somerset (1997), Trading Beyond the Mountains: The British Fur Trade on the Pacific 1793–1843, Vancouver, B.C.: University of British Columbia Press
- Morris, Grace P. (1937), "Development of Astoria, 1811-1850", Oregon Historical Quarterly, 38 (4), Oregon Historical Society: 413–424
- Nisbet, Jack (1994), Sources of the River: Tracking David Thompson Across Western North America, Sasquatch Books, ISBN 1-57061-522-5
- Ronda, James (1990), Astoria & Empire, Lincoln, NE: University of Nebraska Press, ISBN 0-8032-3896-7
- Scholefield, E.O.S.; Howay, F.W. (1914), British Columbia: From the Earliest Times to the Present, vol. 1, Vancouver, B.C.: J. Clarke, archived from the original on March 4, 2016
- Victor, Frances Fuller; Bancroft, Hubert (1890), History of Oregon vol. 2, The Works of Hubert Howe Bancroft, vol. XXX, San Francisco: History Co.
- Jones, Robert Francis (1999), Annals of Astoria: The Headquarters Log of the Pacific Fur Company on the Columbia River, 1811-1813, New York: Fordham Univ Press, ISBN 9780823217632
