= Clatsop Plains =

Area of wetlands and sand dunes in Oregon, US

- Wetlands
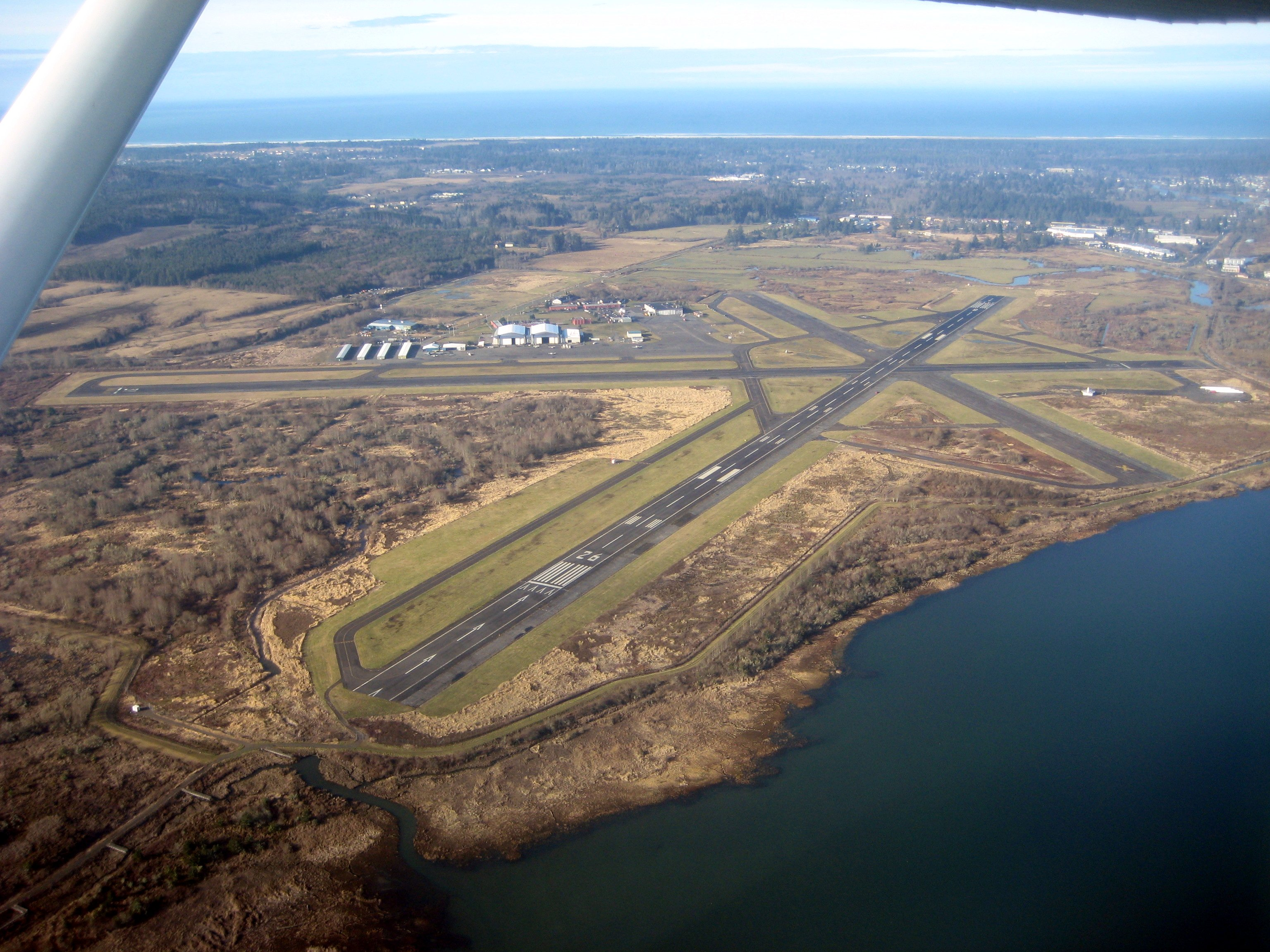
- Aerial view of the northern Clatsop Plains

- Location within Oregon
- Coordinates: 46°04′04″N 123°55′51″W
- Location: Clatsop County, Oregon
- Age: Quaternary

The Clatsop Plains are an area of wetlands and sand dunes between the Northern Oregon Coast Range and Pacific Ocean in northwestern Oregon in the United States. They stretch from near the mouth of the Columbia River south to the vicinity of Tillamook Head near Seaside. The plains are drained by several coastal rivers include the Skipanon River and the Necanicum River, which flow parallel to the coast and empty into the Columbia at Youngs Bay near Astoria and into the Pacific Ocean near Seaside respectively. At the time, the Lewis and Clark Expedition recorded a different river draining the plains which entered the Pacific near the current day Camp Rilea Armed Forces Training Center. Research, 200 years later in 2005, seems to have confirmed this by locating an old river channel.

The Clatsop Plains

The plains are named for the Clatsop tribe of Native Americans who lived in the area at the time of the arrival of Europeans and European Americans by ship at the end of the 18th century and by land at the beginning of the 19th century.

These plains were developed from sand filling in the shoreline during the late Quaternary age. The northern portion is a result of the creation of the south jetty on the Columbia River built in 1885. Within the plain are several lakes including Cullaby, Sunset (Neacoxie), Smith, and Coffenbury. The latter three are filled by groundwater and not local streams or rivers.

The first white settlement of Clatsop Plains was by two Methodist missionaries, the first missionaries to arrive in Clatsop County. Solomon H. Smith who with Rev. Joseph H. Frost established a Methodist mission there in 1841 and built homes for their families on Clatsop Plains.

The first Presbyterian church was founded in 1846. Robert Morrison donated 10 acres for the church grounds, and then two more for a cemetery. The first church was built in 1850, but was destroyed by a windstorm in 1853. It was the first Protestant church built west of the Rocky Mountains. A new church was built and served until 1927, when the current building replaced it. The church is located east of Camp Rilea. The Pioneer cemetery established in 1846, making it the oldest in the county, is the burial place for many early settlers.

A community called "Clatsop Plains" was established and incorporated in 1870, primarily for the purpose of restricting cattle grazing along the sea ridge. This grazing was destroying the ridge grass and plants that prevented sand from blowing onto the nearby farms. As incorporated originally, "Clatsop Plains" extended from the Skipanon River to Seaside. An actual town eventually came into being about a mile north of Seaside, and was later absorbed into Gearhart. However, its early proximity to Seaside is probably why Seaside itself was sometimes referred to Clatsop Plains.

The coastal grassy areas of Clatsop Plains was home to the endangered Oregon silverspot butterfly. Re-establishment efforts are continuing. (Speyeria zerene hippolyta).

A stretch of US 101, the Oregon Coast Highway, runs through most of the length of Clatsop Plains.

== Gallery ==
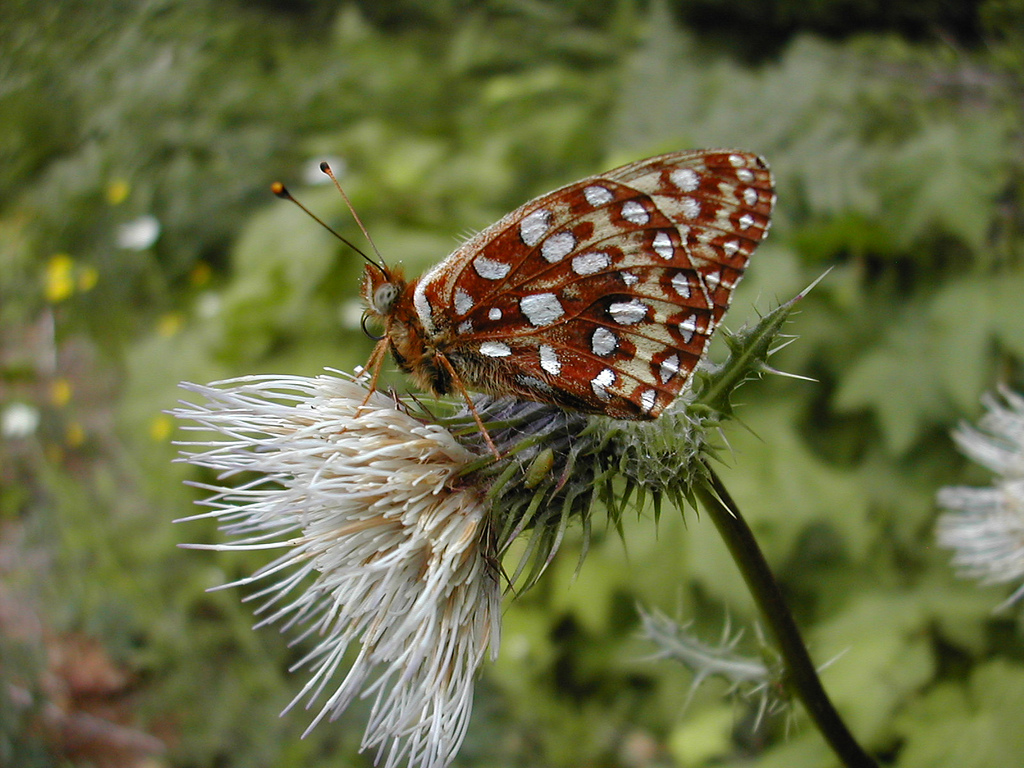
Oregon silverspot butterfly

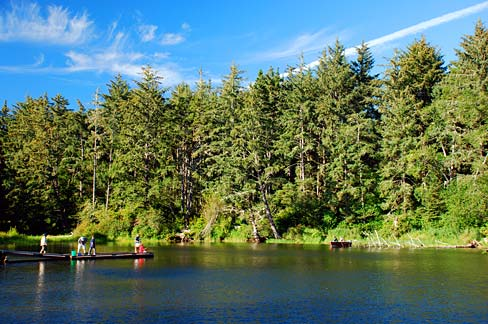
Coffenbury Lake (named for an early settler, George W. Coffenberry/Coffinberry)
