= Joseph H. Frost =

- Born: March 25, 1805; Rochester, New York
- Died: 1866 (aged 60–61)
- Spouse: Sarah R. Frost

Ecclesiastical career
- Church: Methodist Episcopal Church
- Title: Missionary of Clatsop Mission

Joseph Hasbrouck Frost (March 25, 1805 – 1866) was an American Methodist Episcopalian missionary in the Pacific Northwest.

== Early life and career ==
In 1835, Frost began his time with the New York Conference, serving in Windham and Prattsville of New York State. The following year he was administered the spiritual needs of Franklin, New York. In 1838 Frost preached at Methodist Church in Bloomville.

== Oregon Mission ==
In 1839, Frost was listed as an Elder in the New York Conference, noted by official records as being additionally appointed as a "Missionary to Oregon". He and his wife Sarah joined other Methodist members under Jason Lee on board the Lausanne in 1840 and later arrived at Fort Vancouver.

=== Clatsop Mission ===
Frost was given an appointment to open a new post among the Clatsop Chinookans, on the Clatsop Plains. This was near both Fort George and the mouth of the Columbia River in 1841. Until a residency was complete, Frost and his wife resided at Fort George as guests of James Birnie. The mission building site was built within the traditional territory of the Clatsop Chinookans.

Frustrated at his inability to convert the local Clatsop and Nehalem people, Frost took his family and left the area on 14 August 1843. Previously in February 1842, Frost concluded that "there never will be anything like a permanent Christian church raised up among [the Clatsops]" and decided the budget of the mission "ought to be expended to better purpose elsewhere." Along with his family, Frost boarded the Bhering at the Honolulu port and sailed for the United States. They arrived at Boston on 21 March 1844.

== Bibliography ==
- Ancestry.com (2006), Massachusetts, Passenger and Crew Lists, 1820-1963 [database on-line], Provo, UT: Ancestry.com Operations, Inc.
- Ancestry.com (2014), U.S., Dutch Reformed Church Records in Selected States, 1639-1989 [database on-line], Provo, UT: Ancestry.com Operations, Inc.
- Lee, Daniel; Frost, Joseph H. (1844), Ten Years in Oregon, New York: J. Collard, ISBN 9780598285843
- Methodist Episcopal Church (1840), Minutes of the Annual Conferences of the Methodist Episcopal Church, for the years 1829-1839, vol. 2, New York: T. Mason & G. Lane
- Pipes, Nellie B. (1934a), "Journal of John H. Frost, 1840-43", Oregon Historical Quarterly, 35 (1), Portland, OR: Oregon Historical Society: 50–73
- Pipes, Nellie B. (1934c), "Journal of John H. Frost, 1840-43", Oregon Historical Quarterly, 35 (3), Portland, OR: Oregon Historical Society: 235–262
