= Skipanon River =

- Location of the mouth of Skipanon River in Oregon
- Etymology: A Clatsop Indian word, Skippernawin referred to a point at the mouth of the stream

Location
- Country: United States
- State: Oregon
- County: Clatsop County

Physical characteristics
- Source: N. Oregon coastal foothills & Cullaby Lake
  - location: Clatsop County, Oregon
  - coordinates: 46°05′39″N 123°54′32″W
  - elevation: 50 ft (15 m)
- Mouth: Columbia River
  - location: Warrenton, Clatsop County, Oregon
  - coordinates: 46°10′9″N 123°55′37″W
  - elevation: .5 ft (0.15 m)
- Length: 7 mi (11 km)

The Skipanon River is a tributary of the Columbia River, approximately 7 miles (11 km) long, on the Pacific coast of northwest Oregon in the United States. It is the last tributary of the Columbia on the Oregon side, draining an area of coastal bottom land bordered by sand dunes and entering the river from the south at its mouth west of Astoria.

The Skipanon River issues from Cullaby Lake in western Clatsop County, northeast of Seaside and less than 3 miles (4.8 km) from the ocean. It flows north parallel to the coast and east of U.S. Route 101. It enters the northwest end of Youngs Bay at the mouth of the Columbia approximately 1 mile (1.6 km) northeast of Warrenton. The mouth of the river is at river mile 10.7 miles (17.2 km) of the Columbia upstream from its mouth.

The river's name comes from the Clatsop language, originally referring to a point at the river's mouth rather than the river itself. The charts of the Lewis and Clark Expedition show the stream as Skipanarwin Creek. Another variant spelling, Skeppernawin, was common on maps into the 20th century.

== See also ==
- List of rivers of Oregon
