= Daniel Lee (Oregon missionary) =

Oregon missionary

Daniel Lee was a Methodist missionary to the Oregon Country in the Pacific Northwest of North America, beginning in 1834. He accompanied his uncle Jason Lee on the mission, and recounted many of his experiences along with Joseph H. Frost. He married Maria T. Ware, a teacher.
