= Peter M. Weiser =

American soldier

- Born: October 3, 1781; Berks County, Pennsylvania, US
- Died: sometime after the Spring of 1813
- Occupations: soldier, quartermaster, cook, hunter, fur trapper
- Known for: Lewis and Clark Expedition
- Parent: John Phillip Weiser
- Relatives: Conrad Weiser (great-grandfather)

Peter M. Weiser (October 3, 1781 – death between 1813 and 1828) was an American soldier and member of the Corps of Discovery on the Lewis and Clark Expedition.

== Early life ==
Weiser was born in Berks County, Pennsylvania of German parentage, the son of John Phillip Weiser. He was the great-grandson of noted settler and diplomat Conrad Weiser of the Pennsylvania Colony.

== Lewis and Clark Expedition ==
Weiser enlisted as a private in the Corps of Discovery by January 1, 1804. He was probably recruited in 1803 by William Clark at Fort Kaskaskia, Illinois while serving in the 1st Infantry Regiment of the U.S. Army.

Weiser was one of several soldiers in the Corps who faced disciplinary problems before the expedition left Missouri. On March 3, 1804, he, John Colter and others were disciplined for asking permission to go hunting as a pretext for an unauthorized visit to a nearby "whiskey shop". As punishment they were confined to camp for ten days.

During the expedition Weiser often served as quartermaster, cook, and hunter. On August 24, when Lewis had gotten the expedition started toward Lemhi Pass, a Shoshone rode up from the rear of the column to inform Lewis that one of his men was sick. Lewis went back to discover Weiser, whom he dosed with tincture of peppermint and laudanum. During the winter of 1805–06, while the expedition was at Fort Clatsop, he was part of the salt-making detail on the Oregon coast.

In the late spring of 1806, while the Corps was camped near present-day Kamiah in north central Idaho, he took part in a detached search expedition for food in the surrounding mountains. At the time, the Corps was camped by the Clearwater River waiting for the snow to melt on Lolo Pass. After the party noticed that the local Nez Perce had fresh salmon in their lodges, Weiser, Private Frazer and Sgt. John Ordway were sent on expedition to hunt for the fish about 30 miles southwest to the Salmon River, which Clark would call the North Fork of "Lewis's River." (They had been about 125 miles upstream of the Salmon River when they descended it for a short distance in 1805 after crossing Lemhi Pass. They then turned and ascended its North Fork until they left it to cross over to the Bitterroot River, which they considered to be the main fork of Clark's Fork [of the Pend Oreille].) Ironically, this put Weiser quite close to the headwaters of what would eventually be called "Weiser River," probably the closest Weiser ever came to it.

Lewis and Clark separated in two groups on July 3, 1806 east of Lolo Pass, Lewis was to go east to meet the Missouri River at the Great Falls and Clark south; Weiser was in Clark's group. Clark's group ascended the Bitterroot and made their way to Three Forks where they split again. Weiser and Colter were put under the command of Ordway who would descend the Missouri to meet up with Lewis. On July 19, they met part of Lewis's group, and on July 23, Weiser was severely injured in the leg. His group met up with the remaining four of Lewis's group on July 28, and Weiser made it safely back to St. Louis.

== Post-Expedition years ==
In 1807 Corps of Discovery members John Potts and George Drouillard, joined the party of Spanish fur trapper Manuel Lisa on the Upper Missouri River. Lisa and his company of 42 men (including John Baptiste Champlain and Benito Vázquez) moved up the Missouri until they reached the mouth of the Yellowstone River. After ascending the Yellowstone some 170 miles, they established Fort Raymond, a trading post at the mouth of the Bighorn River in present-day Montana.

Weiser and Potts were at Fort Raymond in early July 1808 and the two men contracted to enter into a joint venture, signing a note for $450 for supplies to Lisa's company. Colter apparently affiliated with the venture, and it is unknown where Weiser was when Colter accompanied Potts that autumn to the Jefferson River where Potts was killed by the Blackfoot Indians.

The next summer, Lisa entered into a new venture with Andrew Henry and others, the Missouri Fur Company. The new company decided to relocate its main location to the Three Forks of the Missouri, and the following spring of 1810, Weiser presumably accompanied Henry to build a fort there. The fort was abandoned after a short time due to extensive hostility from the Blackfeet which resulted in the death of Drouillard and several others. Weiser returned to St. Louis in the summer of 1810 and filed suit against Potts' estate to try to recoup his share of the proceeds of the venture, but ultimately had to file for bankruptcy. He then served in the War of 1812 for 30 days in 1813.

== Death ==
The circumstances of Weiser's death are not known. It is thought that, after serving in the War of 1812, he joined back up with the fur trade and was likely killed in that endeavor. Sometime between 1825 and 1828, Clark drew up a list of the Corps members, and simply listed Weiser as "killed."

== Legacy ==
In his 1814 map, Clark named an ambiguous tributary of the Snake River across the Continental Divide from the headwaters of the Madison River for Weiser, and the name was eventually applied to its current feature. The nearby town of Weiser, Idaho was named after the River.
