= Pierre Dorion Jr. =

Métis fur trapper and interpreter (1782–1814)

Pierre Dorion Jr. (1782–1814) was a Métis fur trapper and interpreter who worked across the modern Midwestern United States and later the Pacific Northwest.

== Early life ==
Pierre was named after his father, Pierre Dorion Sr. and had a Yankton Sioux mother. He remained among the Yankton peoples for much of his early life. Dorion met members of the Lewis and Clark Expedition on 29 August 1804. At the time he was engaged in mercantile transactions with some of the 70 Yankton present by the explorer's camp. Later in 1806 he took Marie Aioe Dorion as a wife "through barter or wager." Dorion was employed by Nathaniel Hale Pryor as an interpreter in a trading expedition organized by Pryor in 1807. Besides Dorion there were 10 other men and a small boat used to sail up the Missouri River to trade with the Sioux nations. In 1809, Manuel Lisa hired Dorion for his services as an interpreter and "conducted their traders in safety through the different tribes of the Sioux." While based at Fort Lisa, Dorion quickly became in debt due to excessive purchases of alcohol. In June 1810, Dorion, Marie and their two infant children left Fort Lisa for St. Louis.

== Pacific Fur Company ==
In the winter of 1810-1811, Dorion was the only qualified speaker of the Sioux languages in St. Louis. This made him a desirable hire for fur traders. Both Lisa and W. Price Hunt wanted to have his services for their companies, respectively the Missouri Fur Company and the Pacific Fur Company (PFC). In the end, Hunt was able to secure Dorion, on the condition that Marie and his two children be brought along as well. Early into the travel north where the PFC wintering camp was located, Dorion physically abused his wife and caused her to flee for a day. Upon rejoining the main party, Hunt led the expedition further up the Missouri, intent on following the course made by Lewis and Clark. After leaving Fort Osage, Dorion "severely beat his squaw" as Marie desired to stay with newly made Osage Nation, rather than continue with the expedition.

A war party of several hundred Lakota and Yankton were eventually encountered. A battle was narrowly avoided by the firing the company cannons with only powder and the linguistic skills of Dorion. In the ensuing discussions with assembled Sioux leadership Dorion translated for Hunt. Assurances were given that the expedition wouldn't trade with the neighboring Arikara, Mandan and the Gros Ventre nations, all three of whom the Sioux were at war with. After this the expedition was allowed to continue towards the Pacific Coast.

Lisa and his own expedition caught up with the Pacific Fur Company group in early June. John Bradbury recounted how tensions arose between Dorion and Lisa:

Mr. Lisa had invited Dorion, our interpreter, to his boat, where he had given him some whiskey, and took that opportunity of avowing his intention to take him away from Mr. Hunt, in consequence of a debt due by Dorion to the Missouri Fur Company...

A duel between Lisa and Dorion was narrowly avoided by Henry Marie Brackenridge and Bradbury intervening between the men.

== Death ==
After many material struggles, the overland expedition reached Fort Astoria in 1812. Dorion and his family were sent to the Snake River as part of a trapping outfit under John Reed the following year. Early in 1814, Dorion, Reed and five other trappers were killed by a band of either Northern Shoshone or Bannocks His wife and two children then began their celebrated journey back to the safety of Pacific Fur Company posts.

== Bibliography ==
- Brackenridge, Henry Marie (1904), Thwaites, Reuben Gold (ed.), Brackenridge's Journal of a Voyage up the River Missouri in 1811, Cleveland
- Bradbury, John (1817), Travels into the Interior of America, in the years 1809, 1810, and 1811, London: Smith and Galway
- Morris, Larry E. (2013), The Perilous West: Seven Amazing Explorers and the Founding of the Oregon Trail, Lanham, Maryland: Rowman and Littlefield
- Shirley, Gayle C. (1998), More Than Petticoats: Remarkable Oregon Women, Helena, Montana: Falcon Publishing
