= Johann Conrad Weiser =

Johann Conrad Weiser may refer to:

- Conrad Weiser (1696–1760), Pennsylvanian pioneer, interpreter and diplomat
- Johann Conrad Weiser, Sr. (1662–1746), his father, German Palatine
