= Benito Vázquez =

Benito Andres Vázquez
- Born: 1738; Santiago de Compostela, Galicia, Spain
- Died: 1810 (aged 71–72); St. Louis, Missouri
- Occupations: Soldier, Fur Trader, Merchant, Explorer

Benito Andres Vázquez (1738 in Santiago de Compostela, Galicia, Spain – 1810 in St. Louis, Missouri), was a Spanish soldier and later, became an American fur trader who, while living on the western frontier, became a merchant and explorer. He was the father of fur trader Louis Vasquez.

== Early life ==
Benito was born in Santiago de Compostela, Spain, in 1738. He was son of Francisco Vázquez and Maria de LaPointe. By that time, the Spanish Army was reorganised on the French model and the old Tercios were transformed into Regiments. At the age of 24, Benito was a soldier in the Infantry Regiment of León, Spain. In 1766 he arrived in Spanish Louisiana, with the Spanish army, destined to take over the former French possessions. The Spanish Louisiana was ceded to Spain by France after the British victory in the Seven Years' War, when the British gained Florida in exchange with Spain for French lands west of the Mississippi River. Benito came to Spanish Louisiana in the service of the governor Ulloa, under the command of Pedro Piernas They were first stationed at the Spanish fort at Natchez, then transferred to St. Louis. After a brief period there, they left for Cuba when Ulloa was expelled by the French rebels in Neo Orleans. They returned to St. Louis under the command of the new governor, Alejandro O'Reilly. In 1772, Benito finished his active military service shortly thereafter and began his career as a merchant and fur trader. He was made a militia officer and was cited for heroism for his performance against the British in the May 26, 1780 battle of St. Louis.

=== Marriage and family ===
In September 1773, it was given to him a land grant in St. Louis by Spanish Lt. Governor Piernas. One year after that, Benito married a French woman called Marie-Julie Papin (daughter of Pierre Papin dit Baronet & Catherine-Marguerite-Madeline Guichard). They had twelve children together; Felicite, Julia, Benito Jr., Francisco Javier, Antoine Francois dit Baronet (Zebulon Pikes' interpreter and an officer in the 1st US Infantry Regiment who fought at the battles of Tippecanoe, Ft. Madison and Lundy's Lane), Joseph dit Pepe, Victoria, Marie-Antoinette (died in infancy), Hypolite dit Guillory, Celeste, Catherine-Eulalie & the youngest, a famous fur trader called Pierre Louis Vasquez.

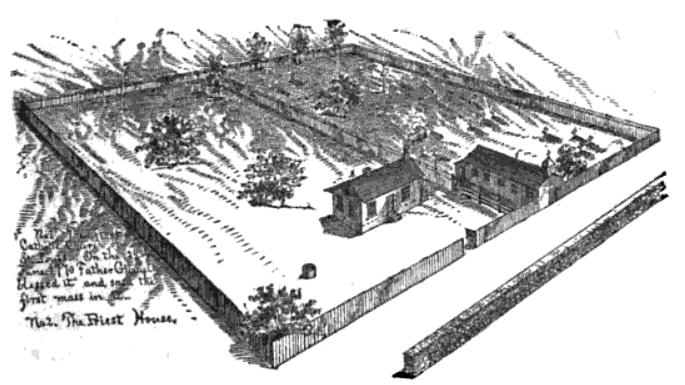
The first Catholic church in St. Louis, built in 1770.

When Pierre Laclède and Auguste Chouteau established the city of St. Louis, they dedicated a plot of land west of Laclède's home for the purposes of the Catholic Church. As a catholic, Benito Vasquez provided the first bell for the original St. Louis Cathedral, the first catholic church in St. Louis, transporting it up from New Orleans.

Benito's house was a poteaux en terre (posts in the earth) house that measured 30 by 25 feet (9.1 m × 7.6 m), and was originally built by Rene Kiersereau in 1766. Vasquez bought the house in Block 9 in 1780 with 62 pounds of furs. The house of posts was built on the site of the north leg of the St. Louis arch.

== Noted activities ==
Benito had trouble making money in the fur trade because he was a small trader trying to compete with the larger interests of the Chouteaus. After denouncing the Spanish governor at New Orleans for not granting him trading rights, Vasquez was jailed for 35 days.

Vasquez became one of the major shippers of goods between St. Louis and New Orleans. He was also considered one of St. Louis’ "merchant elite." When the first Catholic church was built in St Louis, Vasquez helped finance it and was one of the leading members of its congregation. In 1780, he was appointed lieutenant of the militia formed in anticipation of a British attack on the village. The British and their Native American allies did attack, on May 25–26, 1780, but the garrison and its cannon drove them off. He earned the rank of captain in 1784.

Vasquez decided to ally himself with and other merchants in the ill-fated Missouri Company of the 1790s. Formed to bring order and greater profits to the fur trading business, the Missouri Company was plagued by a lack of furs, competition from the British, and attacks by Native American tribes.

American and European fur traders quickly moved up the Missouri River following the Louisiana Purchase and Lewis and Clark's exploration, but even before that, by 1790, Vasquez decided to ally himself with Jacques Clamorgan and other merchants in the ill-fated Missouri Company. Formed to bring order and greater profits to the fur trading business, the Missouri Company was plagued by a lack of furs, competition from the British, and attacks by Native American tribes. Virtually all of its partners lost their investments, plunging many of them into financial ruin.

The next recorded mention of him was in 1794 after he had returned from trading with the Osage tribe.

His fortunes declined and the advent of the Americans in 1804 did nothing to improve them. Vasquez and his wife had to sell their house and were supported by their children. In 1807 the Spanish explorer and fur trader Manuel Lisa began organizing a trade expedition to the upper Missouri River region. The enterprise was led by Lisa himself and Benito Vasquez (Jr,) as his second-in-command. On that expedition, a company of men moved up the Missouri until they reached the mouth of the Yellowstone River. After ascending the Yellowstone more than 150 miles (240 km), Benito Vasquez (Jr.) helped Lisa establishing a trading post on November 21 at the mouth of the Bighorn River in present-day Montana. named Fort Raymond. It was the first such outpost in the upper Missouri region. In 1807 Benito was at the Mandan village, on the Missouri with Manuel Lisa, having problems with the Blackfeet.

In 1809 Benito Vásquez (Jr,) joined Lisa's Missouri Fur Company, based in St. Louis. The city was developing rapidly based on revenues from the western fur trade. Manuel Lisa sent his trappers to the upper Missouri River for furs.

An unidentified illness caused Benito Vázquez death at St. Louis on 22 February 1810.
