= John Bradbury (naturalist) =

English botanist

John Bradbury (20 August 1768 – 16 March 1823) was an English botanist noted for his travels in the United States Midwest and West in the early 19th Century and his eyewitness account of the New Madrid earthquake.

== Early life ==
Bradbury was born at Souracre Fold near Stalybridge in Cheshire in August 1769, where he lived with his parents, sister and three elder brothers.

He was fortunate to be schooled by John Taylor at a humble academy on Cocker Hill in Stalybridge. Taylor was a keen botanist and encouraged Bradbury's very evident interest and talent in this subject often taking him on botanical excursions. Indeed, Taylor recognised that Bradbury would outgrow the confines of the British Isles:

"I venture to predict that this island will soon be too narrow for him"

On leaving school, like many boys in the district Bradbury found work in a cotton mill. He was elected a Fellow of the Linnean Society in 1792.

== Time in the United States ==
While living in Manchester he petitioned the trustees of the Liverpool Botanic Garden (now called Wavertree Botanic Gardens) to fund a visit to the United States of America to collect plants (with a provision that he would work on improving the supply of cotton from America). In the United States he met with Thomas Jefferson during 1809, who recommended that he should base his investigations in St. Louis, Missouri rather than New Orleans, Louisiana.

=== Pacific Fur Company ===
While in St. Louis, Bradbury explored the area and sent seeds back to Liverpool. In 1811 he and naturalist Thomas Nuttall joined Wilson Price Hunt and other members of the Pacific Fur Company (PFC) bound to travel the Missouri River. This group is sometimes referred to as the Astorian Expedition, named after the financier of the venture, John Jacob Astor. The main group of Astorians spent the previous winter on Nodaway Island, at the mouth of Nodaway River in Andrew County, Missouri, just north of St. Joseph. After reaching their camp, Bradbury and the expedition departed on 21 April 1811.

Ramsay Crooks led Bradbury and two French-Canadian voyageurs to the Platte River on 2 May ahead of the main expedition. While the four men reach the outskirts of a major Otoe tribe village, the inhabitants were not present, being out on a hunting sojourn. After Crooks and the others rejoined the party at an Omaha village on 11 May. There, active commercial transactions were done, with Omaha merchants offering "jerked buffalo meat, tallow, corn, and marrow" for vermilion, beads and tobacco carrots. Bradbury noted that two Omaha men had seen him in St. Louis, at the printing office of Joseph Charless, who published the Missouri Gazette. Additionally he detailed that the Omaha village had plots of Aztec tobacco, melons, beans, squashes, corn under cultivation. The Astorians eventually departed the Omaha people and continued to follow the Missouri River.

Employees of the Missouri Fur Company (MFC) under the command of Manuel Lisa were encountered on 3 June. An interpreter hired by Hunt in St. Louis, Pierre Dorion, Jr. had previously worked for the MFC and still had a pending debt with the company. Lisa reminded Dorion of this and a duel between the two men was narrowly averted by Bradbury and Henry Marie Brackenridge intervening. While among the Arikara peoples of modern North Dakota, Bradbury arranged to travel south with Lisa to St. Louis. After arriving at St. Louis he went south to New Orleans, Louisiana.

=== New Madrid earthquake ===
While Bradbury was returning from the Astor Expedition to New Orleans he was near at Chicksaw Bluffs (future site of Memphis, Tennessee on 16 December 1811, on the Mississippi River when the first of three earthquakes known as the New Madrid earthquake occurred. His first person account is reported as the only eyewitness account of the earthquake from a person with a scientific background. He published an account of his research in Travels in the interior of America, in the years 1809, 1810, 1811 which was released in 1817.

=== Botanical work ===
Bradbury documented 40 new species of plants by sending seeds to his son. Some of Bradbury's plants were documented, without Bradbury's permission, by Frederick Traugott Pursh in Flora americae septentrionalis; or A Systematic Arrangement and Description of The Plants of North America ( http://www.botanicus.org/title/b11729004 ) (which is given various publication dates: 1813 or 1814.) Bradbury was "Deeply offended [by Pursh's purloining of his botanical specimens] and with his fame as a collector and discover of new plants stolen, Bradbury did little in botany after that."

== Later life ==
Bradbury had intended to return to England but the War of 1812 delayed the return and he was to study the states east of the Mississippi and published an appendix to his Travels book entitled Remarks on the States of Ohio, Kentucky, and Indiana, with the Illinois and Western Territory, and on the Emigrations to Those Countries. He died in Middletown, Kentucky, after a brief illness.
