= Fort Lisa =

Fort Lisa is the name of two locations significant to fur trading in the Midwestern United States:

- Fort Lisa (Nebraska)
- Fort Lisa (North Dakota)
