= Fort Lisa (North Dakota) =

Trading post

Coordinates: 47°17′46″N 101°17′10″W

The first Fort Lisa (1810-1812), also known as the Fort Manuel Lisa Trading Post, Fort Manuel or Fort Mandan, was started by the notable fur trader Manuel Lisa of the Missouri Fur Company in 1809. This fort is likely where Sacagawea of the Lewis and Clark Expedition died. Fort Lisa superseded Fort Raymond as the uppermost post of the Missouri Fur Company on the Missouri River. This original fort was located near present day Kenel, South Dakota. In 1812 Lisa built a replacement fort downriver near present-day North Omaha, Nebraska, which he also named Fort Lisa.

== History ==
In the winter of 1807, Lisa opened Fort Raymond at the mouth of the Bighorn River in modern Montana. After returning to St. Louis the following year, he formed the Missouri Fur Company with local explorer William Clark and members of the Chouteau family, founders of St. Louis. With company assets allowing a large party of 300 men, Lisa left in 1809 on a fur expedition in the north. After visiting Fort Raymond, he built a new station named Fort Lisa and shifted operations to the new post. The new station was located near a Gros Ventres of the Missouri (Hidatsa) village, in between the mouth of the Little Missouri and that of the Knife rivers in what is now North Dakota. During its first year of operation Pierre Dorion, Jr., his common law wife Marie Aioe Dorion and family resided at the station.

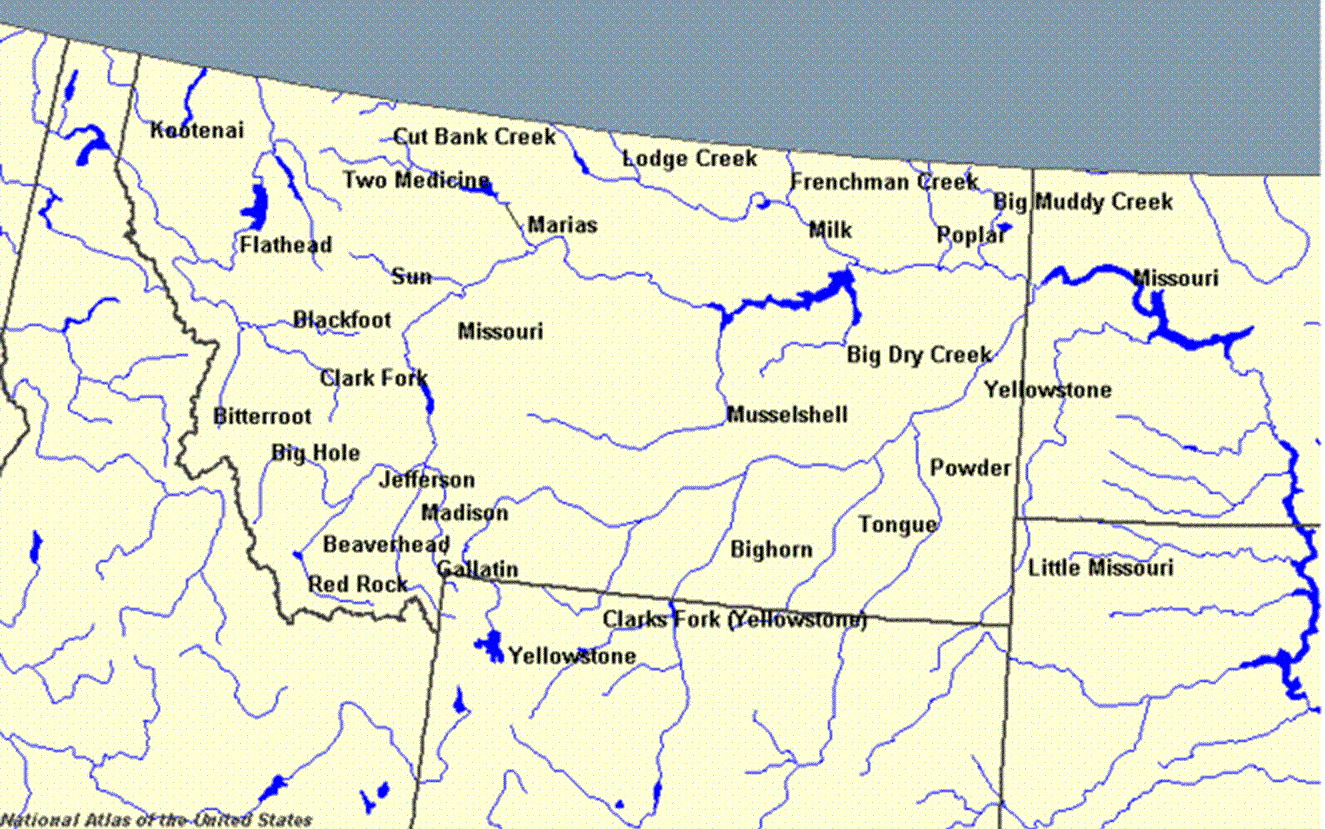
Map of Montana rivers with the Bighorn (center) and Little Missouri (right).

=== Description ===
John Bradbury visited Fort Lisa in 1811 and sketched it as follows:

"The Fort consisted of a square block-house, the lower part of which was a room for furs: the upper part was inhabited by Mr. Lewis and some of the hunters belonging to the establishment. There were some small outhouses, and the whole was surrounded by a pallisado, or piquet, about fifteen feet high. I found attached to it a very pretty garden, in which were peas, beans, sallad, radishes, and other vegetables..."

=== Pacific Fur Company ===
Employees of the Pacific Fur Company visited Fort Lisa on the 23 June 1811. The fellow fur trappers were received favorably by Reuben Lewis, brother of Meriwether Lewis. Ramsay Crooks commanded the group and was sent by W. Price Hunt after making an agreement with Lisa to purchase horses. Fort Lisa was noted to have minimal food supplies at the time. Lisa arrived at the fur trading post on the 25th of June and finalised the transaction with Crooks. Crooks and his employees departed the following day to the Arikara nation, where the majority of the PFC workforce was residing.

=== Sacagawea ===
Henry Brackenridge during 1811 wrote in his journal that Sacagawea, the notable Native American guide for the Lewis and Clark Expedition, was living at Fort Lisa with her husband Charbonneau. He wrote that Sacagawea "...had become sickly and longed to revisit her native country." The following year, John Luttig, a clerk at Fort Manuel Lisa, recorded in his journal on December 20, 1812, that "...the wife of Charbonneau, a Snake Squaw, died of putrid fever." (Note: Often called childbed fever, this was a frequent complication of childbirth.) Luttig noted that she was "aged about 25 years. She left a fine infant girl." Charbonneau had already entrusted his and Sacagawea's son Jean Baptiste into Clark's care for a boarding school education. Clark was fond of the boy and offered to support his education.

=== Abandonment ===
Difficulties with certain Indigenous nations and shipping at this location meant that by 1812, Fort Lisa ceased to be utilized by the MFC. Lisa built a third fort downriver about 12 miles north of present-day Omaha in that year. He named this Fort Lisa, too, and shifted his operations to this location. This became the main post of the Missouri Fur Company and its successors under various names.

== See also ==
- Dakota Territory
- Louisiana Purchase
