= Louis Vasquez =

American explorer and trader (1798–1868)

Pierre Louis Vasquez also known as Luis Vázquez (October 3, 1798 – September 5, 1868) was a mountain man and trader. He was a contemporary of many famous European-American explorers of the early west and would come to know many of them, including Jim Bridger, Manuel Lisa, Kit Carson and Andrew Sublette, besides his own father Benito Vázquez.

== Family and early life ==
Louis was born and raised at St. Louis, Missouri. He was the son of the Spanish fur trader Benito Vázquez and Marie-Julie Papin (daughter of Pierre Papin & Catherine Guichard), so was of Spanish and French Canadian (European) descent. In 1823, he became a fur trader, receiving his first license to trade with the Pawnee. By the early 1830s he had shifted his operations to the mountains, becoming a popular and active mountain man and trader. Having been educated by the priests at the St. Louis Cathedral, he was one of the few mountain men that was literate. Although he signed all of his letters, as "Louis", Pierre Louis was nicknamed "Old Vaskiss" by other Mountain men. Louis was the youngest of eleven brothers.

== Noted activities ==
Louis Vasquez joined the Ashley-Henry fur trade expeditions in 1822 or 23, and became one of the foremost mountain men. In 1834, He became a partner of Andrew Sublette and went back to trade on the South Platte after obtaining a trading license in St. Louis, Missouri, from William Clark, the Superintendent of Indian Affairs. In 1835 he built Fort Vasquez. He traveled back and forth between the mountains and St. Louis almost yearly, his reputation growing. Unable to turn a profit, they sold Fort Vasquez to Lock and Randolph in 1840, who subsequently went bankrupt and abandoned the structure in 1842. Due to the bankruptcy, Louis Vasquez and Andrew Sublette could not collect the sum owed to them for the sale. Vasquez then became associated with Jim Bridger. By 1843 they had built Fort Bridger on Blacks Fork of the Green River, which became as much an emigrant station as trading post.

At Fort Laramie in 1846 Vasquez hired Narcissa Land Ashcraft to be his cook at Fort Bridger. They may have eventually been married in St. Louis or had a common law marriage, which was ratified by Father Pierre DeSmet near Fort Laramie in September, 1851. Narcissus had a son, Hiram and a daughter, Armilda who came with her to Fort Bridger in Wyoming. There they had four more children; Louis, Mary Ann, Sarah Ellen and Narcissa Burdette. Vasquez opened a store at Salt Lake City in 1855. He and Bridger sold their fort in 1858, but Vasquez already had retired to Missouri. In 1868 he died at his Westport home, and was buried at St. Mary's Church cemetery. Years before, in 1853, Louis Vasquez gave to his good friend Jim Bridger his own rifle as a gift. From 1998 the rifle is shown at the Museum of the Mountain Man at Pinedale, Wyoming.
