= Johann Conrad Weiser Sr. =

German soldier

Johann Conrad Weiser
- Born: 1662; Großaspach, Württemberg, Holy Roman Empire
- Died: May 1746 (aged 83–84); Womelsdorf, Berks County, Pennsylvania
- Occupations: Soldier, baker, farmer
- Known for: German Palatine
- Spouse: Anna Magdalena Ubelin
- Children: See below
- Parent(s): Jacob Weiser; Anna Trefz

Johann Conrad Weiser Sr. (1662–1746) was a German soldier, baker, and farmer who fled his homeland with thousands of other Germans from the Palatinate region due to constant invasions by French armies and destruction of crops. As a result, Weiser, along with his countrymen, became known as the German Palatines. Ultimately, they settled in the Colony of New York where Weiser became a leader in the Palatine community and was founder of their settlement of Weiser's Dorf, now known as Middleburgh, New York. When the Germans were in dispute with their English landlords and the colonial government of New York, he was among the representatives chosen to go to London and seek help from the British government. This contributed to the downfall of the governorship of New York's colonial governor, Robert Hunter.

== Biography ==
=== Early life ===
Johann Conrad Weiser was born in 1662 in Großaspach, Württemberg, Holy Roman Empire to Jacob Weiser, an innkeeper, and his wife, Anna Trefz. Weiser married Anna Magdalena Uebele and they had a total of fifteen children. He served as a corporal in the army of the Holy Roman Empire, and fought in the Nine Years' War of 1688 to 1697 between a coalition of European powers and France. He was a member of the Württemberg Blue Dragoons, and was stationed at Affstätt, Herrenberg, Württemberg in the 1690s. Soon after the birth of Conrad Jr., the Weisers moved back to their ancestral home of Großspach. Afterwards, he followed the trade of a baker.

=== Immigration ===
Weiser and his family were German Palatines who fled Germany because of the destruction of crops by invading French armies, and the icy cold winter of 1708—09; Weiser's wife Anna Magdeleana died suddenly of an attack of the gout while pregnant with their fifteenth child on May 1, 1709. On June 24, 1709, Weiser and eight children, moved away from Großaspach. His married daughter, Catrina, stayed behind with her husband, Conrad Boss and two children. Weiser sold his house, fields, meadows, vineyard, and garden to Conrad and Catrina, for 75 gulden. The Weisers, along with over 15,000 other Palatines, left their homeland and traveled west to the Rhine River, and then down the Rhine into the Netherlands. As the number of German refugees increased, the Dutch decided to send them to England. In late summer 1709, the Weisers arrived in London, along with thousands of other Germans.

Queen Anne of Great Britain was sympathetic toward the German Palatines, and allowed them to stay in England. However, as their numbers grew, the Board of Trade and Plantations prepared a plan to send them to America, where the Crown promised them free land after they worked off their passage by producing naval stores. The Weisers remained in England for a few months. They left England in December 1709 on the Lyon, one of ten ships carrying about 3,000 people to America, including Weiser and his family. The Lyon arrived in New York on June 13, 1710. After being held in quarantine to let ship diseases run their course, the surviving refugees were taken up the Hudson River to Livingstone's manor.

=== Life in the New York colony ===
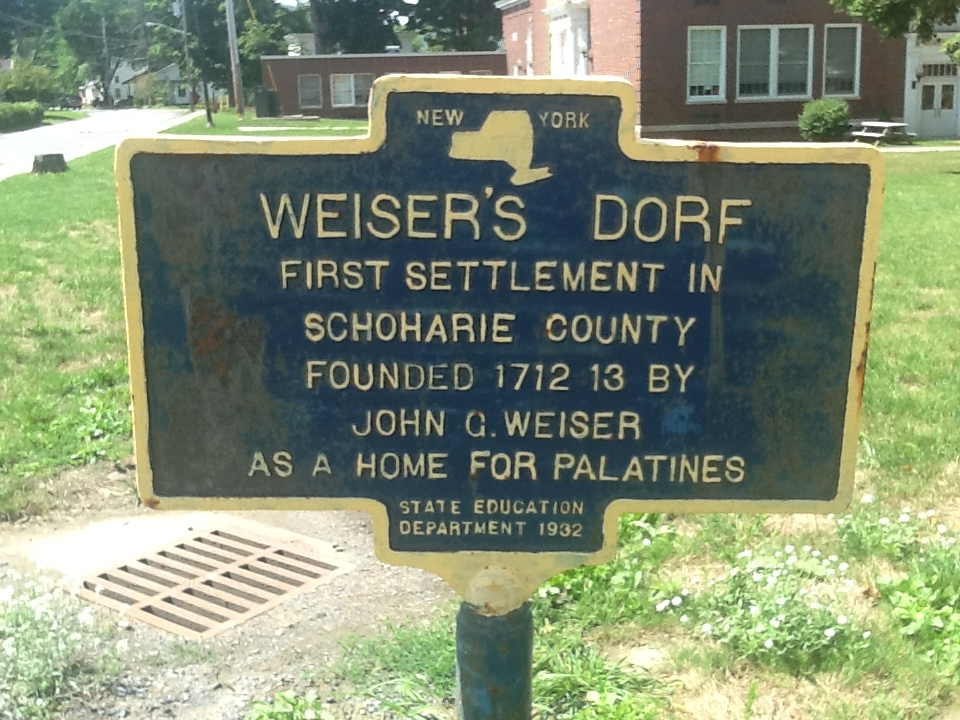
Historical marker in Middleburgh, New York noting the settlement of Weiser's Dorf.

Despite being promised free land, the Germans were required to work for several years to pay for their transportation expenses. The Germans were also forced to pay rent for their property. The Germans were divided into five camps, and Weiser was appointed to be in charge of one. The Germans were to produce tar from the trees, but they were unsuitable. Weiser took the Germans' complaints to Robert Hunter, the colonial governor of New York. In 1711, the English conscripted German Palatines to fight the French in northern New York. Weiser served as a captain in one of the Palatine contingents. Upon their return, the Palatines discovered that their families had nearly starved in their absence. Again, Weiser led the Palatines in complaining to Governor Hunter. In 1711, Weiser remarried to Anna Margaretha Müller. His children disapproved of the marriage, and Conrad Jr. wrote, "It was an unhappy match, and was the cause of my brothers and sisters' all becoming scattered."

In the fall of 1713, Weiser and his family reached Schenectady. They stayed at the home of John Meyndert during the winter of 1713-14. The Mohawk, part of the Iroquois Confederacy, helped the German Palatines throughout the winter, in which they earned their trust. After negotiating with the Mohawk, the Germans were given permission to move further west in the valley. In the spring of 1714, with the help of Mohawk Indians, Weiser led his family, along with about 150 other families to Schoharie, located 40 miles (64 km) west of Albany. At this time, a Maqua chief visited Weiser, and suggested that his son, the younger Conrad, go with him and learn the Maqua language, and he did. The Germans who settled here were very poor to start out with. At Schoharie, they grew corn, potatoes, and ground beans to get through the following year. Life was harsh, and families sometimes went two or three days without food. Eventually, multiple villages in the area sprang up, more food was grown, and thus life improved and people no longer starved. But, despite the fact that Hunter had let the Germans go free, he threatened the Germans not to move to Schoharie, or he would see it as rebellion.

The government of New York was displeased with the Germans, despite having left New York. In 1715, Hunter sent an agent, Adam Vrooman, to Schoharie, to make deeds for the Palatines, although the Mohawk had granted them the land. The Palatines were resistant, and the land that the Germans had settled on in Schoharie was taken away and granted by Hunter to seven landlords. The German deputies were stripped of their titles, and the promise of free land by Queen Anne was ignored. Hunter authorized a warrant for Weiser's arrest, after Vrooman complained of mistreatment while in Schoharie, but Weiser escaped. This brought an uproar, and the Germans rebelled. They drove out the sheriff who was sent from Albany, and became increasingly hostile to the government.

=== Commissioner to London ===
After five years of hostility between the Germans and the New York government, the German Palatines decided to send representatives to appeal to the Board of Trade in London. The community sent three men to represent them: Johann Conrad Weiser, Wilhelm Scheff, and Gerhardt Walrath. Hunter and his allies worked on a compromise to prevent the men from leaving. Because Hunter had threatened to arrest Weiser, the three commissioners decided to leave from Philadelphia instead of New York. They departed the city in 1718, but fell into the hands of pirates in the Delaware Bay. They lost their personal money, but not that of the colony. They were released and left without money and suitable clothing.

The ship stopped at Boston for more supplies. The commissioners finally arrived in London and found that Queen Anne had died. The new monarch, King George I, was not interested in their case. Hunter had sent agents to England, who portrayed the Germans as rebels and enemies to the Crown. Progress was slow for the representatives. During this time, Walrath grew tired of waiting and embarked for home, but died at sea. Later, Weiser and Scheff were imprisoned for debt. They wrote for help, but their letters were intercepted. Finally, word reached Schoharie and the community collected money for their redemption. After months of waiting, their debts were paid. In July 1720, Weiser and Scheff petitioned to the Board of Trade.

By this time, Hunter had resigned as governor and took a position in Jamaica. The newly commissioned Governor of New York, William Burnet, was ordered to grant land to the Germans. In 1723 he completed what was called the Burnetsfield Patent, whereby 100 heads of families received about 100 acres (0.40 km^{2}) each on the north and south sides of the Mohawk River west of present-day Little Falls. Weiser and Scheff were dissatisfied and had a falling out in 1721. Refusing to follow Weiser, Scheff returned home but died six months later. Weiser returned to North America in 1723. He decided to migrate to the colony of Pennsylvania.

=== Later life and death ===
In 1723, William Keith, Baronet Governor of Pennsylvania, was in Albany on business when he heard about the suffering of the Germans in New York. He invited them to the colony of Pennsylvania. With the help of the Mohawk, Weiser led a group of Germans from Schoharie south to the Susquehanna River; they traveled along Indian paths and by canoe to present-day Tulpehocken in the spring of 1723. Weiser was unhappy with many of his fellow Germans, and returned to New York a few years later. He wandered around New York for several years. Conrad Jr. brought him to the home of his grandsons in Pennsylvania in May 1746, where he died soon after.

== Family ==
Conrad Weiser the Younger

=== Children ===
Johann Conrad Weiser and Anna Magdalena Ubelin had 16 children, of which 13 are known: Maria Catharine Weiser (who married Conrad Boss and remained in Großaspach); Anna Margarete Weiser; Anna Magdalena Weiser (who married Jan Johannes De Lange); Maria Sabina Weiser; Johann Conrad Weiser Jr. (who became a pioneer, interpreter, and diplomat in Pennsylvania); George Frederick Weiser; Christopher Frederick Weiser; and Anna Barbara Weiser (who married Nicholas Pickard). John Frederick Weiser, Rebecca Weiser), John Frederick Weiser (later children were frequently named after one who had died), Erhard Frederick Weiser, and Rebecca Weiser all died young, the second John Frederick while the family was at the work camp at Livingston Manor.

=== Descendants ===
Numerous Conrad and Anna Magdalena Ubelin Weiser descendants played notable roles in early colonial and federal American life:

- Major General Peter Muhlenberg;
- Gotthilf Heinrich Ernst Muhlenberg and William Augustus Muhlenberg, American clergymen; and
- Peter M. Weiser, a member of the Corps of Discovery on the Lewis and Clark Expedition.

Several politicians descend from Weiser, including:

- Frederick Muhlenberg, the 1st Speaker of the United States House of Representatives;
- John Andrew Schulze, the 6th Governor of Pennsylvania;
- Francis Swaine Muhlenberg, US Congressman;
- Henry A. P. Muhlenberg, Congressman;
- Henry Augustus Muhlenberg, Congressman;
- William Muhlenberg Hiester, Congressman;
- Isaac Ellmaker Hiester, Congressman; and
- Frederick Augustus Muhlenberg, Congressman.
