= Saint Louis, Oregon =

Unincorporated community in the state of Oregon, United States

- Unincorporated community
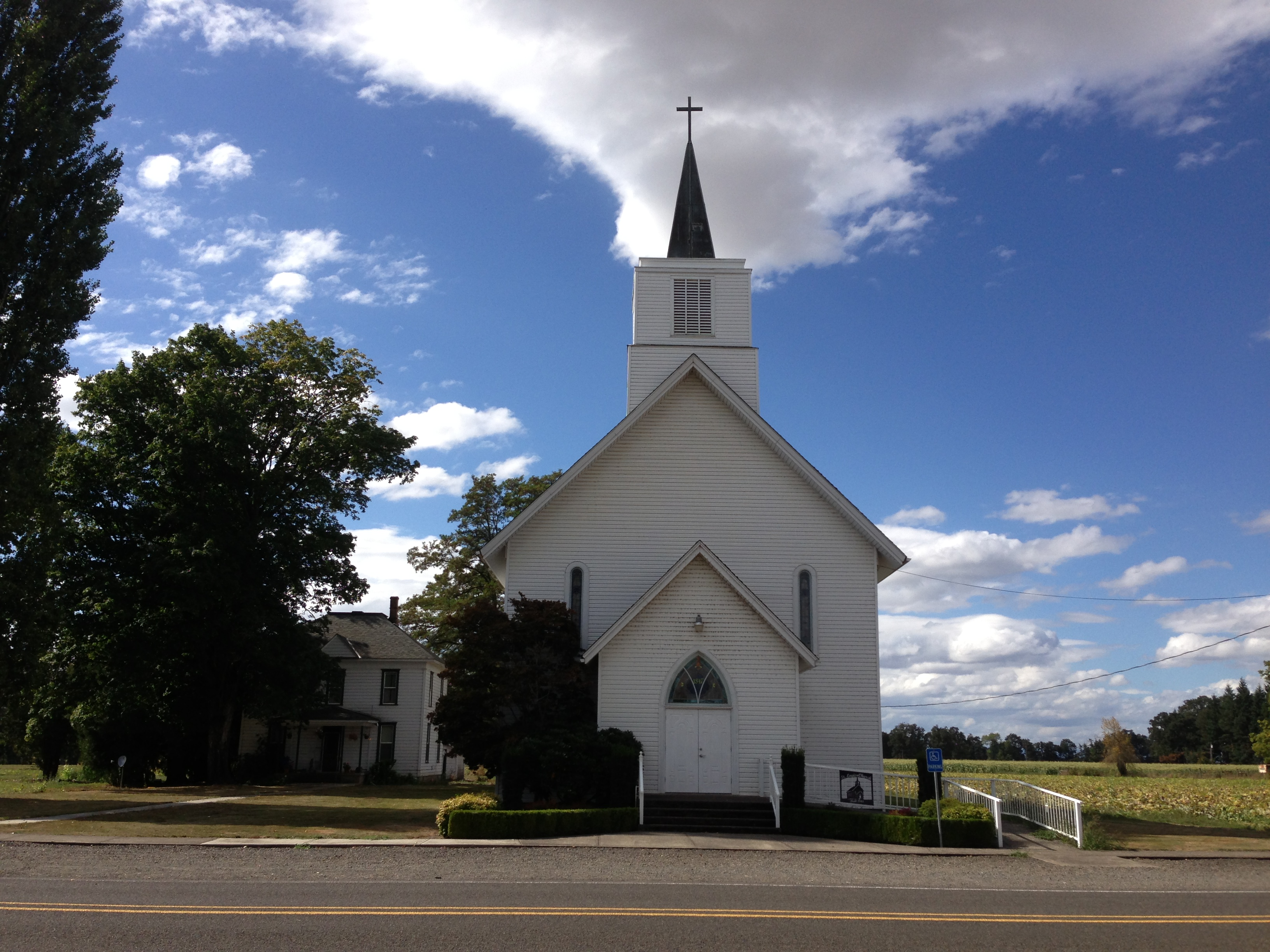
- St. Louis Catholic Church

- Location within Oregon Location within the United States
- Coordinates: 45°07′25″N 122°56′30″W
- Country: United States
- State: Oregon
- County: Marion
- Elevation: 184 ft (56 m)
- Time zone: UTC-8 (Pacific (PST))
  - Summer (DST): UTC-7 (PDT)
- ZIP code: 97071, 97026
- Area codes: 503 and 971
- GNIS feature ID: 1158467

Saint Louis is an unincorporated community in the French Prairie area of Marion County, Oregon, United States, about three miles northwest of Gervais, at the intersection of St. Louis and Manning roads. It is part of the Salem Metropolitan Statistical Area.

== History ==
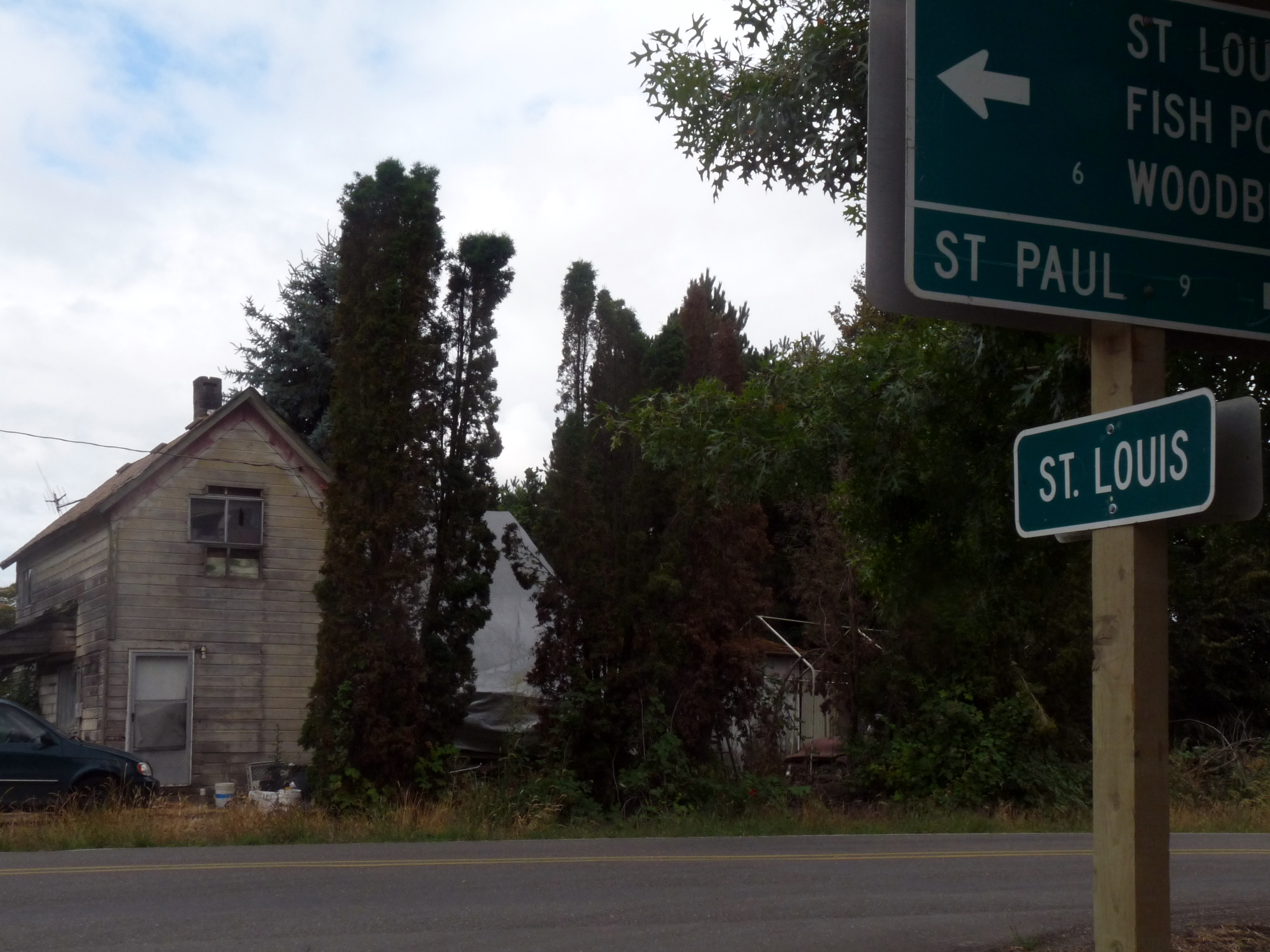
Entering St. Louis, Oregon.

One of the oldest communities in the state, Saint Louis was founded in 1845 when a Jesuit missionary, Reverend Aloysius Verecuysee, built a log church there for the early settlers. Saint Louis parish was organized in 1847 with a resident priest and named for St. Louis, King of France. It was the third parish organized in what is now the Archdiocese of Portland. The Saint Louis Catholic Church, built in 1880 on the site of the original Saint Louis cemetery, is still in operation. It is the oldest wooden church in the archdiocese. The current Saint Louis cemetery is northwest of the church. Saint Louis post office operated from 1860 until 1901; today Saint Louis has a Gervais mailing address. At one time the community had a school and store.

== See also ==
- Marie Aioe Dorion, member of the Astor Expedition buried in Saint Louis
- St. Paul, Oregon, site of the oldest church and second-oldest parish in the archdiocese
