= Joshua Pilcher =

Superintendent of Indian Affairs from 1838 to 1843

- Born: March 15, 1790; Culpeper County, Virginia, US
- Died: June 5, 1843 (aged 53); St. Louis, Missouri, US
- Occupations: Fur trader, Indian agent

Joshua Pilcher (March 15, 1790 in Culpeper County, Virginia – June 5, 1843 in St. Louis, Missouri) was an American fur trader and Indian agent. After the death of Manuel Lisa in 1820, Pilcher became the owner and president of the Missouri Fur Company, based in St. Louis. He was appointed US Superintendent for Indian Affairs (1838-1843) in the region after William Clark.

== Early life and education ==
Pilcher was born in Culpeper County, Virginia. When he was five, his family moved to Lexington, Kentucky. Later, during the War of 1812, Pilcher moved to Saint Louis, a thriving town based on fur trading, located on the Mississippi River.

== Career ==
He entered hatmaking in St. Louis. Then he became interested in the fur trade, the chief driver of the St. Louis economy. In 1819, he expanded his business to include fur trading, becoming a partner in the Missouri Fur Company. This had been started by French Creole families in St. Louis, and was later managed solely by Manuel Lisa. After Lisa'a death in 1820, Pilcher bought the company.

In 1838, President Martin Van Buren appointed Pilcher as the US Superintendent of Indian Affairs at St. Louis. He served in that position until his death.

Believed to have been wealthy at his death, Pilcher owned real estate and more than 150 slaves. His relatives were surprised at his will, which did not mention most of his holdings and was not what they expected from such a businessman. They were never able to solve the estate issues.

Pilcher was first buried at Christ Church Cemetery, according to his will. After it was closed, a friend had his remains reinterred at Bellefontaine Cemetery.

== Marriage and family ==
Pilcher married an "Indian woman," which was quite common for fur traders on the antebellum frontier. Her name was Poporine Barada. They had several children, including a son named John Pilcher. Poprine died when John was little and Joshua did not want to care for him. John was raised by Big Elk, the Omaha Chief.

== Bibliography ==
- Morton, J. Sterling (1905), Illustrated History of Nebraska, Lincoln, Nebraska: Jacob North and Co.
