= Conrad Weiser =

Pennsylvania German pioneer (1696–1760)

- Anonymous, undated drawing that may be an artist's impression of Conrad Weiser, owned by a descendant. No known life portraits exist.
- Born: Johann Conrad Weiser, Jr. November 2, 1696; Herrenberg, Württemberg, Germany
- Died: July 13, 1760 (aged 63); Womelsdorf, Province of Pennsylvania, British America
- Parent(s): Johann Conrad Weiser, Sr. Anna Magdalena Ubelin
- Relatives: Peter Muhlenberg (grandson); Peter M. Weiser (great-grandson)

Signature
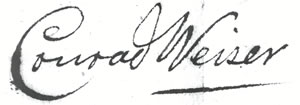

Conrad Weiser (November 2, 1696 – July 13, 1760), born Johann Conrad Weiser, Jr., was a Pennsylvania German pioneer who served as an interpreter and diplomat between the Pennsylvania Colony and Native American nations. Primarily a farmer, he also worked as a tanner, and later served as a soldier and judge. He lived part of the time for six years at Ephrata Cloister, a Protestant monastic community in Lancaster County.

As an emissary in councils between Native Americans and the colonies, especially Pennsylvania, during the late 18th century's tensions of the French and Indian War (Seven Years' War), he contributed to alliances that supported the British effort.

== Early years ==
Conrad Weiser was born in 1696 in the small village of Affstätt in Herrenberg, in the Duchy of Württemberg (now in Baden-Württemberg, Germany), where his father (Johann Conrad Weiser Sr.) was stationed as a member of the Württemberg Blue Dragoons. Soon after Conrad's birth, his father was discharged from the Blue Dragoons and moved back to the family ancestral home of Großaspach. In 1709 the boy's mother, Anna Magdalena, died of fever. Their lands had been ravaged by repeated French invasions, there was pestilence, and the people were weakened by an unusually cold and long winter. Conrad Weiser Sr. wrote for his children, "Buried beside Her Ancestors, she was a god-fearing woman and much loved by Her neighbors. Her motto was Jesus I live for thee, I die for thee, thine am I in life and death."

Conrad Weiser and his family were among thousands of refugees who left German lands that year, many of them from the Palatine area. They traveled down the Rhine River and then to England, which had offered some support for the Protestant refugees. Thousands of Palatine German refugees made their way to London seeking escape from the harsh conditions; there were so many that the English had to make a camp for them outside the London walls for the winter. The following year in 1710, the Crown (under Queen Anne) arranged for transport in ten ships of the nearly 3,000 Germans to the New York colony. The Crown supported migration of the immigrants to help settle the New York colony. The plan was that they would work off their passage in a form of indenture in camps devoted to producing ships' stores, such as tar and other materials. Later they would be allowed to trade their work for land. Most of the Germans were first located in what were called the East and West Camps along the Hudson River, near Livingston Manor. It was not until 1723 that some 100 heads of families received land grants in the central Mohawk Valley, under Governor Burnetsfield.

Weiser senior moved his family to the Schoharie Valley, south of the Mohawk River, earlier than that. When Conrad was 16, his father agreed to a chief's proposal for the youth to live with the Mohawk in the upper Schoharie Valley. During his stay in the winter and spring of 1712–1713, Weiser learned much about the Mohawk language and the customs of the people, who were the easternmost nation of the Haudenosaunee League. He endured hardships of cold, hunger, and homesickness. Weiser returned to his own people toward the end of July 1713.

On November 22, 1720, at the age of 24, Weiser married Anna Eve Feck, a daughter of Johan Peter Feg and Anna Maria Risch. (Anna Eve Feck was born January 25, 1705, in Schoharie County, New York, and died June 11, 1781, in Womelsdorf, Berks County, Pennsylvania.) In 1729 the couple followed the Susquehanna River south out of New York and settled their young family on a farm in Womelsdorf, Pennsylvania near present-day Reading. The couple had fourteen children, of whom only seven reached adulthood.

== Service ==
Conrad Weiser Signature

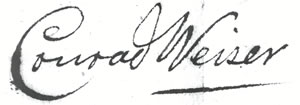
Conrad Weiser signature

Weiser's colonial service began in 1731. The Haudenosaunee sent Shikellamy, an Oneida chief, as an emissary to other tribes and the British. Shikellamy lived on the Susquehanna River at Shamokin village, near present-day Sunbury, Pennsylvania. An oral tradition holds that Weiser met Shikellamy while hunting. In any case, the two became friends. When Shikellamy traveled to Philadelphia for a council with representatives of the province of Pennsylvania, he brought Weiser with him. The Oneida chief trusted him and considered him an adopted son of the Mohawk. Weiser impressed the Pennsylvania governor and council, which thereafter depended on his services as an interpreter. Weiser also interpreted in a follow-up council in Philadelphia in August, 1732.

During the treaty in Philadelphia of 1736, Shikellamy, Weiser, and the Pennsylvanians negotiated a deed whereby the Haudenosaunee sold the land drained by the Delaware River and south of the Blue Mountain. Since the Haudenosaunee had not until then laid claim to this land, Pennsylvania's agreement to purchase from them represented a significant change in the colony's policy toward the Native Americans. William Penn, who had died in 1718, had never taken sides in disputes between tribes. By this formal purchase, the Pennsylvanians were favoring the Haudenosaunee over the claims of the Lenape (whom the English called the Delaware after the river they named after a lord) for the same land. Along with the Walking Purchase of the following year, this treaty (entered into by Penn's sons) exacerbated Pennsylvania-Lenape relations. The Lenape became disenchanted with the English colonials as a result; during the French and Indian Wars, they sided with the French and took part in armed actions against the colonists, causing many deaths. Penn's purchase persuaded the Six Nations of the Haudenosaunee to continue to side with the British over the French in that war. Also, by that time the Haudenosaunee nations had more trading relationships with the English in New York and Pennsylvania than they did the French, who were based further north.

During the winter of 1737, beginning February 27, Weiser was commissioned by Virginia Governor William Gooch to attempt to broker a peace between southern tribes and the Haudenosaunee. Some of the latter tribes had been hunting in the Shenandoah Valley. Weiser and his German companion, Stoffel Stump, had to survive high snow, freezing temperatures, and starvation rations to make the six-week journey in winter to the Haudenosaunee capital at Onondaga, in upstate New York near present-day Syracuse. Weiser persuaded the Haudenosaunee not to send any war parties south in the spring, but failed to convince them to send emissaries to parlay with the southern tribes. Impressed with his fortitude, the Haudenosaunee named Weiser Tarachiawagon (Holder of the Heavens). The colonists feared that spill-over violence from conflicts between the Haudenosaunee and southern tribes, such as the Catawba, would have drawn first Virginia, and then Pennsylvania, into conflict with the Haudenosaunee. Therefore, this peace-brokering had a profound effect on Native American/colonial relations.

In 1742, Weiser interpreted at a treaty meeting between the Haudenosaunee and English colonials at Philadelphia, when they were paid for the land purchased in 1736. During this council, the Onondaga chief Canasatego castigated the Lenape/Delawares for engaging in independent land sales. He ordered them to remove their settlements to either Wyoming (Wyomissing) or Shamokin village. The Lenape began to migrate to the Ohio Valley to escape the Haudenosaunee and English colonial pressures; that migration had begun as early as the 1720s. There, they were positioned to trade with the French. At the same time, they launched raids as far east as the Susquehanna River during the French and Indian Wars.

In June 1743, following conflict between Haudenosaunee warriors and the Virginia militia at the Battle of Galudoghson, Weiser was sent by Governor Gooch to Onondaga to meet with the Haudenosaunee leaders. The governor sent £100 worth of goods with Weiser as a peace offering. The battle was one of the motivating factors that led colonial authorities to negotiate the 1744 Treaty of Lancaster.

In 1744, Weiser acted as the interpreter for the Treaty of Lancaster, which was agreed to by representatives of the Haudenosaunee and the colonies of Pennsylvania, Maryland and Virginia. During the final day of the treaty council, on July 4, Canasatego spoke about the Haudenosaunee concepts of political unity:

Our wise forefathers established Union and Amity between the Five Nations. This has made us formidable; this has given us great Weight and Authority with our neighboring Nations. We are a powerful Confederacy; and by your observing the same methods, our wise forefathers have taken, you will acquire such Strength and power. Therefore whatever befalls you, never fall out with one another.

Benjamin Franklin printed this speech, which some historians believe influenced development of American concepts of political unity.

After the Treaty of Lancaster, Virginia and Pennsylvania colonial officials acted as if the Haudenosaunee had sold them settlement rights to the Ohio Valley, but the Haudenosaunee did not believe they had done so. In 1748, Pennsylvania sent Conrad Weiser to Logstown, a council and trade village on the Ohio River. Here he held council with chiefs representing 10 indigenous groups, including the Lenape, Shawnee, and the Six Nations of the Haudenosaunee. He arrived at a treaty of friendship between Pennsylvania and these tribes. Threatened by this development and the continued activity of British traders in the Ohio Valley, the French redoubled their diplomatic efforts. In addition, they began to build a string of forts to protect their interests, culminating in Fort Duquesne in 1754 at the confluence of the Allegheny and Monongahela rivers, forming the Ohio River. This is where present-day Pittsburgh, Pennsylvania later developed.

In 1750, Weiser traveled again to Onondaga, where he found the political dynamics in the Six Nations had shifted. Canasatego, always pro-British, had died. Some Haudenosaunee nations were leaning toward the French, although the Mohawk remained pro-British. They had extensive trade relations with the British in Albany and eastern province of New York.

Early in the summer of 1754, on the eve of the eruption in the colonies of tensions from the Seven Years' War, called the French and Indian War in North America, Weiser was a member of a Pennsylvania delegation to Albany. The English government had called the meeting, hoping to win assurances of Haudenosaunee support in the looming war with the French. The Haudenosaunee and seven colonies sent representatives. Because of divisions within both the British and Native American ranks, the council did not result in the treaty of support which the crown desired. Instead, each colony made the best deal it could with individual Haudenosaunee leaders. Not only did no single person speak for the Haudenosaunee League, but bands in each nation acted in decentralized ways in this and other wars. No single chief represented any nation when it was at war.

Conrad Weiser negotiated one of the more successful agreements. Some lower-level chiefs deeded to the colony most of the land remaining in present-day Pennsylvania, including the southwestern part that Virginia was also still claiming.

In 1756, the government appointed Weiser and Ben Franklin to lead construction of a series of forts on the frontier between the Delaware River and the Susquehanna River. In the fall of 1758, Weiser attended a council at Easton, Pennsylvania. Colonial leaders from Pennsylvania met with the Haudenosaunee and other Native American groups. Weiser helped smooth over the tense meeting. With the Treaty of Easton, the tribes in the Ohio Valley agreed to abandon support for the French. This collapse of Native American support was a factor in the French decision to demolish Fort Duquesne and withdraw from the Forks of the Ohio.

Throughout his decades-long career, Weiser built on his knowledge of Native American languages and culture to become a key player in treaty negotiations, land purchases, and the formulation of Pennsylvania's policies toward Native Americans. Because of his early experiences with the Haudenosaunee, Weiser was inclined to be sympathetic to their interpretation of events, as opposed to the Lenape or the Shawnee. This may have exacerbated Pennsylvanian-Lenape/Shawnee relations. Their alliance with the French during the war resulted in deaths of Pennsylvania colonists during the French and Indian Wars.

But for many years, Weiser helped to keep the powerful Haudenosaunee allied with the British, as opposed to the French. This important service contributed to the continued survival of the British colonies and is believed to have helped the victory of the British over the French in the French and Indian Wars.

== Other interests ==
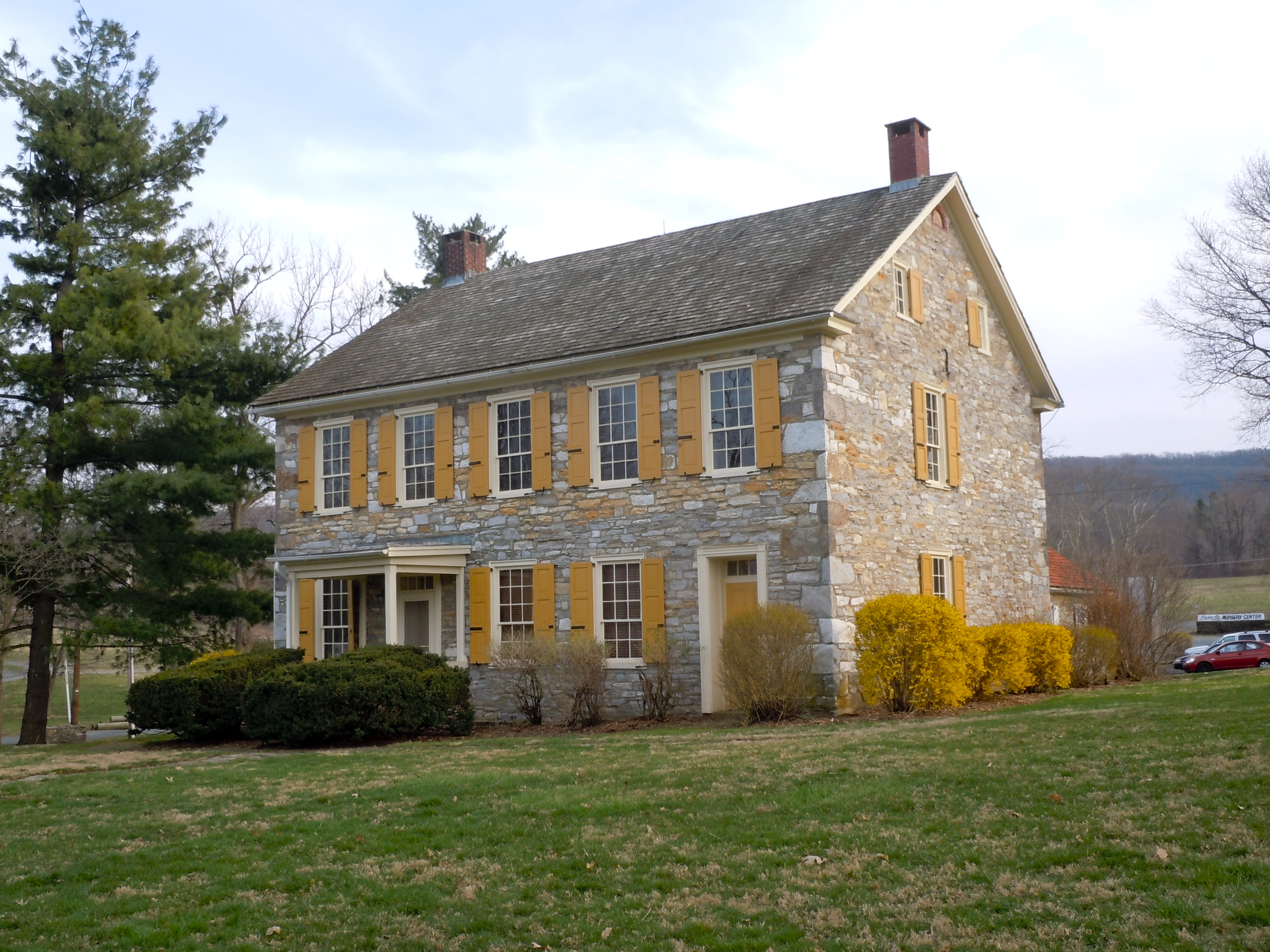
Conrad Weiser Homestead, Womelsdorf, Berks County, PA

Between 1734 and 1741, Weiser became a follower of Conrad Beissel, a German Baptist preacher and musician who founded what became known as the Ephrata Cloister, a Protestant monastic settlement in the Ephrata Township, Lancaster County, Pennsylvania. Most people were encouraged to be celibate, although there were also married couples at the community. Weiser lived there for periods over six years. His wife lived there only a few months before returning to their farm. Weiser visited her frequently enough to father four more children. In addition, he took leaves of absence from the monastery for diplomatic duties, such as those he performed for the colony of Pennsylvania in 1736 and 1737.

Like many other colonists, Weiser combined farming with other trades: tanner, merchant, and land speculator. He drew the plan for the town of Reading in 1748, was a key figure in the creation of Berks County in 1752, and was appointed to serve as its chief judge until 1760. Weiser was also a teacher and a lay minister of the Lutheran Church, and one of the founders of Trinity Church in Reading.

In 1756, during the French and Indian War, the Lenape began to raid central Pennsylvania. When the colony organized a militia, its leaders appointed Weiser as a Lt. Colonel. Working with Benjamin Franklin, he planned and established a series of forts between the Delaware and Susquehannah rivers. When General Forbes evicted the French from Fort Duquesne in 1758, the threat subsided. Following its victory in the Seven Years War, Britain later gained all French territory east of the Mississippi River at the Treaty of Paris in 1763.

== Death and legacy ==
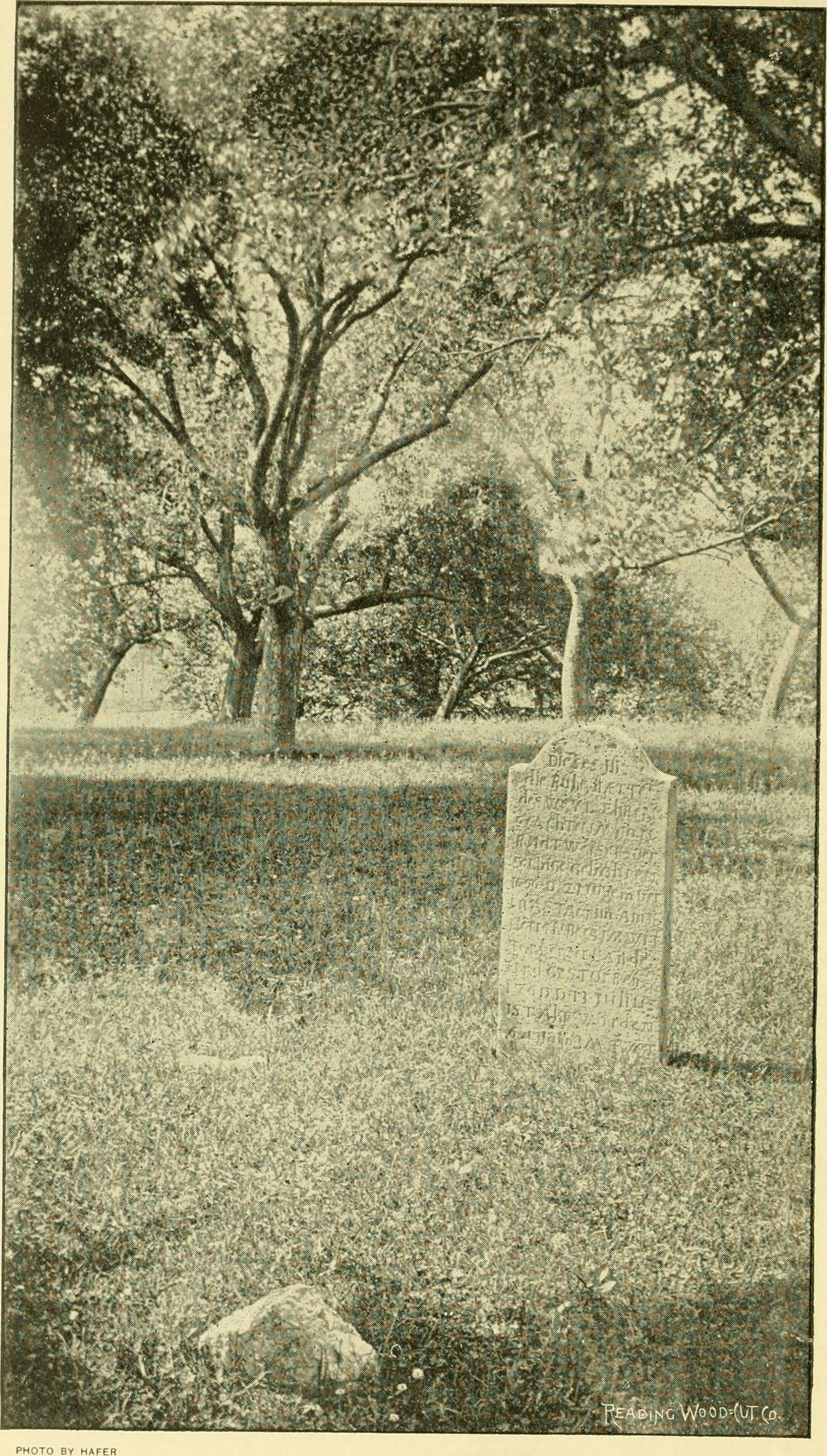
Tombstone

Weiser died on his farm on July 13, 1760, and was buried on a small hill slightly west of his house. Weiser's will bequeathed about 4,000 acres (16 km^{2}) and part of his farm to Berks County. Shortly after Weiser's death, relations between the colonists and the Native Americans began a rapid decline. Although the British leaders tried to restrict colonial settlement to east of the Appalachians, to preserve Native American territory west of there, the colonists kept pushing into western territories and encroaching on the various nations' hunting grounds and territories. Armed conflicts increased.

Since the 20th century, the Conrad Weiser Homestead in Womelsdorf, has been partly administered by the Pennsylvania Historical and Museum Commission and a supporters group known as Friends of the Weiser Homestead. It has been preserved to serve as an interpretive center for 18th-century farming, political and colonial history, and hosts regular re-enactments, especially of events during the French and Indian War.

Route 422 in Berks County passes near the site. It contains original and historic buildings and the family graveyard on a 26 acres (0.11 km^{2}) site. In 1928 the state contracted with the Olmsted Brothers to landscape some of the grounds. Due to state budget cutbacks since 2008, public access to the buildings has been limited to Charter Day; the first Sunday of each month; Wednesdays and both weekend days in the summer; special interpretive events; and appointments.

Weiser and Anna's descendants continued the family's civic involvement. Their daughter Maria married Henry Muhlenberg. Their son Peter Muhlenberg became a Major General in the Continental Army during the American Revolution, and Frederick Muhlenberg served as the first Speaker of the United States House of Representatives. A great-grandson, Peter M. Weiser (born 1781), joined the Corps of Discovery on the Lewis and Clark Expedition in 1804–1806.

=== Memorials ===
In 1996, a daffodil was named for Weiser.

==== Places named for Conrad Weiser ====
- Camp Conrad Weiser is a 500-acre (2.0 km^{2}) YMCA overnight camp in Berks County. Founded in 1948, it serves boys and girls aged six to sixteen.
- Conrad Weiser Area School District in western Berks County serves the townships of South Heidelberg Township, Heidelberg Township, North Heidelberg Township, and Marion Township, and the boroughs of Wernersville, Robesonia, and Womelsdorf.
- The Weiser State Forest occupies 17,961 acres (72.69 km^{2}) on several tracts in Carbon, Columbia, Dauphin, Northumberland, and Schuylkill counties in southeastern Pennsylvania. However, since the realignment of Pennsylvania State Forest Districts on July 1, 2005, northern Berks County is no longer part of Weiser State Forest District #18.
- US 422 is named Conrad Weiser Parkway from the Lebanon County/Berks County border to East High Street in Womelsdorf, Pennsylvania.
