= Jacques Clamorgan =

Adventurer and American landowner from the West Indies (died 1814)

Jacques Phillippe Clamorgan (d. 1814) was an adventurer, fur trader and land owner in the United States.

== Life ==
Claymorgan was born around 1730 in the West Indies. By 1780, he was a known associate of Thompson and Company of Kingston, Jamaica, possibly working in the Caribbean slave trade, and Marmillion and Company of New Orleans.

In 1781, Clamorgan arrived in St. Louis, then under Spanish regime, and laid claim to more than 1 million acres of Upper Louisiana land, granted by the Spanish authorities. He contributed to a Catholic church in Ste. Genevieve, and traded around the Missouri River Valley and as far as Santa Fe, preceding both the Lewis and Clark Expedition and Santa Fe Trail. In 1793, he and Francisco Luis Héctor de Carondelet established the Company of Discoveries of the Upper Missouri, later called the Missouri Company, to expand Spanish control of trade routes and resist British incursions. As director of the company, he endeavored to find a route to the Pacific Ocean and set up trade monopolies with Baron Carondelet and indigenous tribes of the Upper Mississippi River. Clamorgan undermined the company by attempting to build a competitor financed by Andrew Todd, who died before plans could come into fruition. Despite efforts of fellow St. Louis businessman Auguste Chouteau, the company dissolved prior to the Louisiana Purchase.

Following the Louisiana Purchase, the US offered $8 million in response to Clamorgan's Spanish titles of property, however Clamorgan refused to accept the money. Due to Clamorgan's power in the region he was given a seat in the Court of Quarter Sessions, a governmental body that existed for St. Louis composed of Judicial, Executive and Legislative powers.

Clamorgan was not married, but known to live with enslaved women of color, fathering four mixed children by three women. He established freedom for his children before his death. In a tax-evasion effort, Clamorgan set Ester, his enslaved concubine, free in order to give her some of his land holdings. Ester then sued Clamorgan for rightful ownership of this land, and won through a series of lawsuits. She became one of the richest African-American people in St. Louis.

== Death ==
Clamorgan died in November 1814, leaving behind several children and his vast wealth. His grandson, Cyprian Clamorgan, wrote a book entitled The Colored Aristocracy of St. Louis.
