= Marie Aioe Dorion =

Métis fur trader (c. 1786–1850)

Marie Dorion
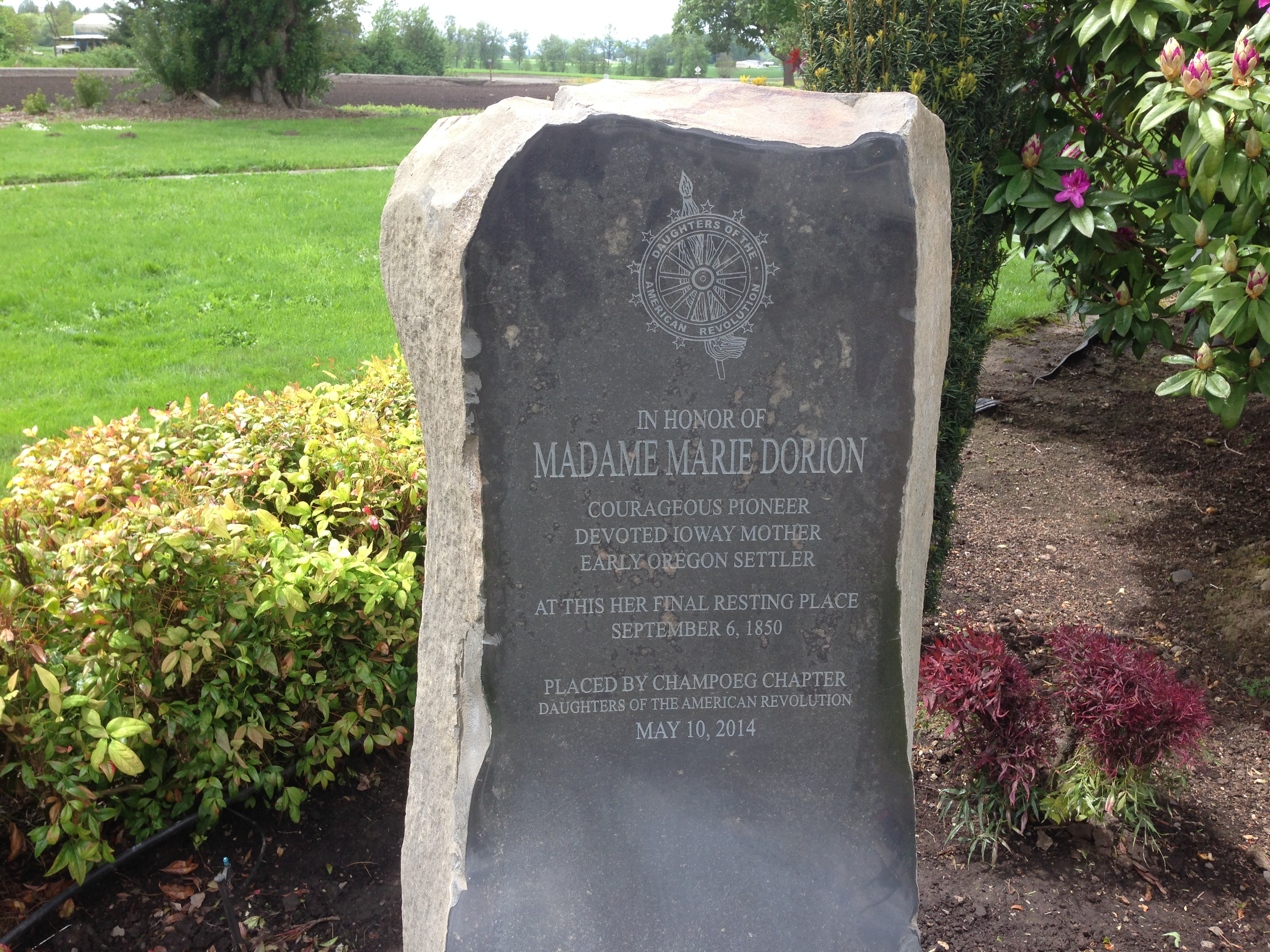
- Dorion historic marker outside St. Louis Catholic Church
- Born: Probably 1786; Louisiana (New Spain)
- Died: September 5, 1850 (aged 63–64); Saint Louis, Oregon Territory
- Known for: Assisting fur-trading expeditions in the Pacific Northwest; wilderness survival skills
- Spouse(s): Pierre Dorion Jr., Louis Joseph Venier, Jean Baptiste Toupin
- Relatives: Five children

"Madame" Marie Aioe Dorion Venier Toupin (ca. 1786 – September 5, 1850) was the only female member of an overland expedition sent by Pacific Fur Company to the Pacific Northwest in 1810. Like her first husband, Pierre Dorion Jr., she was Métis. Her mother was of the Iowa people and her father was French Canadian. She was also known as Marie Laguivoise, a name recorded in 1841 at the Willamette Mission and apparently a variation on Aiaouez, later rendered as Iowa.

== Missouri ==
It is likely that Dorion and Sacagawea knew one another. Peter Stark notes the similarities between the two women in his book Astoria: both women were originally based in the then-small settlement of St. Louis, and they were both wives of interpreters in the burgeoning Missouri fur trade.

== Pacific Northwest ==
Her first husband Pierre Dorion Jr. was hired by the Pacific Fur Company to join Wilson Price Hunt and a group on an overland expedition to Fort Astoria. Also present were their two young boys, approximately two and four years old. Dorion gave birth to another child near what is now North Powder, Oregon, who died several days later. After reaching Fort Astoria, Dorion and her family returned with a trapping party to the Snake River area. As the months became colder, some of the party stayed to build a cabin on the Snake River while the rest, including Giles Le Clarc and the Dorion family, continued to travel to a better trapping area. Maria and the children stayed at a hut that the men had built processing the animals. It was one of these days when her husband and a small trapping party were attacked by a band of Bannocks and killed. Only Giles Le Clarc lived long enough to travel back to the hut and warn Dorion of the attack.

There were several horses left by the Bannock warriors and were promptly taken by Dorion back to the small fur trading post. However, upon reaching the post, she discovered the few staff had been killed and scalped. Attempting to reach another safe fur trading station in the Pacific Northwest, one of Dorion's two horses collapsed in the Blue Mountains. She supported her two children for 50 days during winter. Dorion created snare traps out of the horse manes to provide a supply of mice and squirrels for her family. She additionally smoked the horseflesh, collected frozen berries, and later gathered the inner flesh of trees to prevent her family starving. Near the end of March, Dorion was able to progress west, eventually reaching a Walla Walla village, exhausted and short of food. The village leadership provided material support and aid while she waited for the arrival of the Astorians who would be in the region for spring trade. The Astorians would have missed Dorion and her children if her youngest had not spotted their canoes and called for them to stop.

Dorion married twice more and had three more children. Her second husband was Louis Venier. With her third husband, Jean Toupin, she settled near Saint Louis, Oregon, on the French Prairie. It was here that she began to be known as "Madame" or "Madame Iowa". One of her two eldest sons, Jean Baptiste, joined the Oregon Rifles and fought in the Cayuse War.

== Death and legacy ==
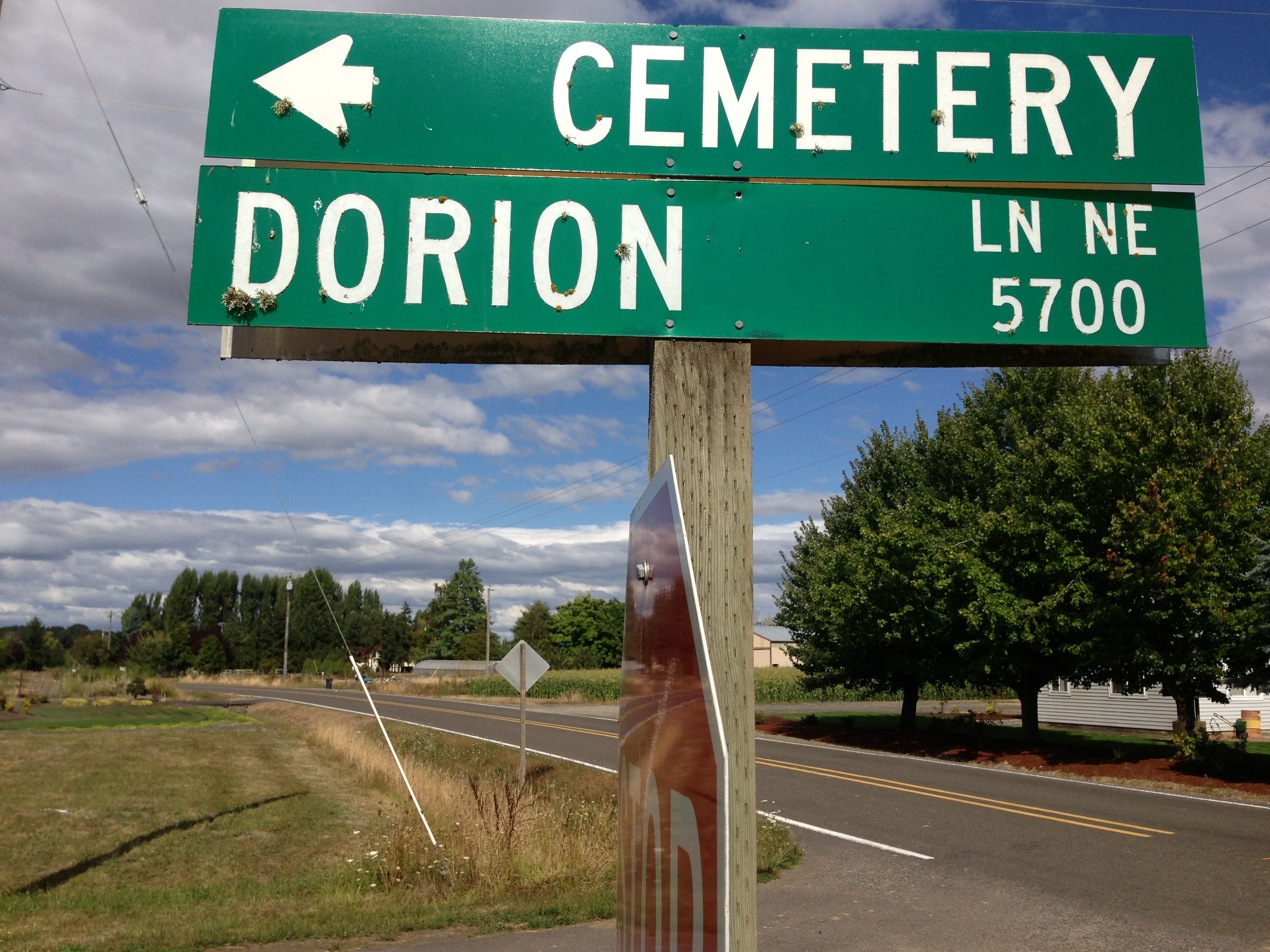
Dorion Lane in St. Louis, Oregon

After Dorion Venier Toupin died on September 5, 1850, she was buried inside the original log Catholic church in Saint Louis. When the church burned down in 1880 and the current church built, the location of Dorion's grave was forgotten and remains unknown to this day. It was only when the church register was translated from French into English many years after the original church burned down that it was learned that Dorion had been buried there. There is no record of why she received this honor instead of being buried in the nearby cemetery, but church burial requires special dispensation and may have indicated that Dorion was especially devout.

Among the places memorializing Dorion are two parks: Madame Dorion Memorial Park at the mouth of the Walla Walla River near Wallula, Washington, and Marie Dorion Park, a Milton-Freewater, Oregon city park near the foothills of the Blue Mountains. The Dorion Complex residence hall at Eastern Oregon University is in La Grande. There is a plaque noting the place near North Powder where she likely gave birth. Her name is also one of the 158 names of people important to Oregon's history that are painted in the House and Senate chambers of the Oregon State Capitol. Her name is in the Senate chamber. St. Louis, Oregon, has a street named after her, Dorion Lane. Pendleton, Oregon, has a street named after her, SE Dorion Avenue and SW Dorion Avenue.

Oregon author Jane Kirkpatrick wrote the Tender Ties trilogy of historical novels based on Dorion's life. The individual titles in the series are A Name of Her Own, Every Fixed Star, and Hold Tight the Thread.

On May 10, 2014, the Daughters of the American Revolution held a service at Saint Louis Catholic Church dedicating a historical marker in Dorion's honor.

== See also ==
Books and journalists that mention Dorion's survival story:

- Astoria, by Washington Irving
- Gabriel Franchère
- Alexander Ross

== Works cited ==
- Chandler, J. C. (2013). Hidden History of Portland, Oregon. Charleston, S.C.: The History Press. ISBN 978-1-62619-198-3.
- Morris, Larry E. (2013). The Perilous West: Seven Amazing Explorers and the Founding of the Oregon Trail. Lanham, Maryland: Rowman and Littlefield. ISBN 978-1-4422-1112-4.
- Shirley, Gayle C. (1998). More Than Petticoats: Remarkable Oregon Women. Helena, Montana: Falcon Publishing. ISBN 1-56044-668-4.
