= Fort Raymond =

Fur trading outpost in Montana (1807–1810)

Fort Raymond was an outpost established by fur trader Manuel Lisa. Alternatively it was called either Manuel's Fort or Fort Manuel. It was the first trading post maintained by European descendants in the modern state of Montana.

== Construction ==
In November 1807 work began on the station that Lisa named after his son. The initial buildings were "temporary shelters and a trading house with two rooms and a loft". The post was located at the confluence of the Bighorn and the Yellowstone Rivers.

== Operations ==
Lisa oversaw daily operations for nine months after opening Fort Raymond. During the winter John Colter was sent with trade goods to the Niitsitapi homelands to establish commercial relations. He met a group of indigenous men and agreed to travel with them. These men were from two nations that were traditional enemies of the Niitsitapi, the Salish and Apsáalooke. An armed group of Niitsitapiksi was encountered and a battle ensued with Colter joining his traveling party against the Nittsitapi. Colter's presence on the battlefield, noted by Niitsitapiksi warriors, had a ruinous effect on future commercial efforts by Manuel Lisa.

== Closure ==
Lisa returned to St. Louis in 1808, leaving a complement of fur trappers at Fort Raymond. Upon arriving at St. Louis Lisa joined William Clark in forming a jointly owned effort to exploit fur bearing populations, the Missouri Fur Company (MFC). After returning to the station in the spring of 1809, Lisa formally added Fort Raymond as MFC property. The station was abandoned after the opening of Fort Lisa in 1810.

== Bibliography ==
=== Articles ===
- Binnema, Ted; Dobak, William A. (2009). "'Like the Greedy Wolf': The Blackfeet, the St. Louis Fur Trade, and War Fever, 1807–1831". Journal of the Early Republic. 29 (3). Philadelphia, PA: University of Pennsylvania Press: 411–440. ISSN 0275-1275. JSTOR 40541856.

=== Books ===
- Brackenridge, Henry Marie (1817). Views of Louisiana: Containing Geographical, Statistical and Historical Notices of that Vast and Important Portion of America. Baltimore, MD: Schaeffer & Maund.
- Chittenden, Hiram M. (1902). The American Fur Trade of the Far West. Vol. 1. New York: Francis P. Harper.
- Morris, Larry E. (2013). The Perilous West: Seven Amazing Explorers and the Founding of the Oregon Trail. Lanham, MD: Rowman & Littlefield Publishing. ISBN 9781442211124.
