= Manuel Lisa =

American fur trader (1772–1820)

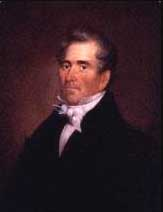
- Portrait in 1818
- Born: September 8, 1772; New Orleans, Louisiana
- Died: August 12, 1820 (aged 47); St. Louis, Missouri
- Other name: Manuel de Lisa
- Occupations: land owner, merchant, fur trader, Indian agent, explorer
- Employer(s): Missouri Fur Company, US Government
- Known for: Spanish American frontiersman, who was co-owner of the Missouri Fur Company and as a United States Indian agent, during the War of 1812, helped to pacify the Teton Sioux, Omaha and Ponca Nations and keep them loyal, in wartime, to America.
- Spouse(s): 1) Polly Charles Chew; 2) Mitane (Meetahnay); and 3) Mary Hempstead Keeney
- Children: 1) children; 2) Rosalie and Christopher; and 3) no children

Signature
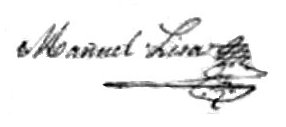

Manuel Lisa, also known as Manuel de Lisa (September 8, 1772, in New Orleans Louisiana (New Spain) – August 12, 1820, in St. Louis, Missouri), was a Spanish citizen and later American citizen who, while living on the western frontier, became a landowner, merchant, fur trader, United States Indian agent, and explorer. Lisa was among the founders, in St. Louis, of the Missouri Fur Company, an early fur trading company. Manuel Lisa gained respect through his trading among Native American tribes of the upper Missouri River region, such as the Teton Sioux, Omaha and Ponca.

After being appointed, as US Indian agent, during the War of 1812, Lisa used his standing among the tribes to encourage their alliance with the United States and their warfare against tribes allied with the United Kingdom. While still married to a European-American woman in St. Louis, where he kept a residence, in 1814 Lisa married Mitane, a daughter of Big Elk, the principal chief of the Omaha people, as part of securing their alliance. They had two children together, whom Lisa provided for equally in his will with his children by his other marriage.

== Early life ==
Little is known of the early life of Manuel Lisa, but he is believed to have been born in 1772 in New Orleans, then part of Spanish Louisiana. It was ceded to Spain by France after the British victory in the Seven Years' War, when the British gained Florida in exchange with Spain for French lands west of the Mississippi River. His father, Christoval de Lisa, was born in Murcia, Spain, while his mother, Maria Ignacia Rodriguez, was born to a colonial family in St. Augustine, Florida. It is likely that Christoval came to Spanish Louisiana in the service of the governor Alejandro O'Reilly, who started his tenure in 1769. Manuel had at least one elder brother, Joaquin Lisa, who worked with him in his early trade expeditions.

By 1789, Manuel Lisa and his brother Joaquin were trading on the Mississippi River in New Madrid, Missouri; the next recorded mention of Manuel Lisa was again in New Madrid, after he had returned from trading along the Wabash River.

== Marriage and family ==
By 1796 Lisa had married Polly Charles Chew (d. 1817), a young widow from New Orleans. After he obtained a land grant in the Missouri area, they relocated to St. Louis, which was the center of the region's thriving fur trade, established primarily by French colonists, some also from New Orleans. Polly Lisa lived in the city with their three children while her husband made his long expeditions to various Indian territories on the Upper Missouri River.

After founding Fort Lisa about 1813, a post in what is now part of Omaha, Nebraska, Lisa worked to gain alliances with local tribes, such as the Omaha. After being appointed US Indian agent in the area by the governor of the Missouri Territory, in 1814 Lisa married Mitane, a daughter of Big Elk, the principal chief of the Omaha until 1846. Both sides saw it as a strategic alliance. Lisa and Mitane had two children together, Rosalie and Christopher, born in subsequent years after Lisa's expeditions and wintering over at Fort Lisa.

"Kinship and ties of affinity proved more than merely useful to the traders. They were both a source of power and a necessity if one was to achieve success in the trade." Only traders were accepted for marriages to high-status women, such as the daughters of chiefs, as the chiefs saw such marriages as a way to increase their own power. As the Omaha had a patrilineal system, the children of Lisa and Mitane were considered "white" as their father was "white". The tribe protected them, but unless such mixed-race children were officially adopted by a man of the tribe, they were not considered Omaha and had no real place in a gens (clan), the basic kinship unit.

Polly Chew Lisa died in 1817 in St. Louis while Manuel Lisa was away on an expedition. After his return the following year, on August 5, 1818, Lisa married the widow Mary Hempstead Keeny, a sister of his friend, the attorney Edward Hempstead. As a widow, she had migrated with her parents and siblings from Connecticut to join four brothers already in Missouri.

In 1819 Lisa took his new wife Mary with him for his next expedition and winter at Fort Lisa, Nebraska. He tried to gain custody of his children with Mitane, who let him take Rosalie back to St. Louis the next year for education at a Catholic school, but refused to let him have Christopher. Lisa included provisions for both Rosalie and Christopher in his will, along with his children by his first wife Polly Chew. Only Rosalie Lisa Ely (c. 1815 – 1904) survived to adulthood, married and had children.

== Land and purchases of enslaved people in the Louisiana Territory ==
In 1799, Manuel Lisa requested a land grant; according to his letter to the Spanish governor, Manuel wanted it "upon one of the banks of the River Missouri, in a place where may be found some small creek emptying into the said river, in order to facilitate the raising of cattle, and, with time, to be able to make shipments of salted and dried meat to the capital." After being awarded the grant, Manuel Lisa and his wife relocated to St. Louis, where they purchased a home on Second Street near the Mississippi River. In the late 1790s and early 1800s, Lisa purchased numerous enslaved people.

== Early trade expeditions ==
Lisa likely moved to St. Louis to enter the fur trade, the major part of the regional economy. By 1802, he had obtained a trade monopoly from French officials (the territory had traded hands again) with the Osage Nation. (The monopoly had formerly been held by Auguste Chouteau, a French colonist and first settler of St. Louis). But, after the Louisiana Purchase and annexation of the territory by the United States, Lisa's relationship with the new government officials was not as strong. He competed with Pierre Chouteau, a prominent member of the founding family, who had gained a position as a U.S. government Indian agent; Chouteau and his brother had gained their wealth and social positions through the fur trade and as merchants.

Lisa had difficult relations with James Wilkinson, then-governor of U.S. Louisiana Territory. Later found to have been a secret agent of the Spanish Crown, Wilkinson denied Lisa's requests to establish trade routes to Santa Fe, New Mexico, which was still under Spanish colonial rule. In 1806, Wilkinson warned Zebulon Pike, undertaking Pike's Expedition, to prevent Lisa's efforts to make business connections to Santa Fe.

Having been stymied by the government and the Chouteau family, Lisa began organizing a trade expedition to the upper Missouri River region. On the first expedition, which departed in April 1807, Lisa and his company of 42 men (including John Colter, George Drouillard or Benito Vázquez) moved up the Missouri until they reached the mouth of the Yellowstone River. After ascending the Yellowstone some 170 miles (270 km), Lisa established a trading post on November 21 at the mouth of the Bighorn River in present-day Montana. Named Fort Raymond for his son (also known as Fort Manuel), it was the first such outpost in the upper Missouri region.

Lisa assigned John Colter of his party to explore the region and trade with the nearby Blackfeet tribe. During his exploration, Colter became the first known European to visit what is now known as Yellowstone National Park; he reported on what was named the eponymous Colter's Hell.

In July 1808, after a successful trading season, Lisa departed Fort Raymond, leaving behind a small party of men for the winter. While operations from the area were profitable for Lisa, the outpost suffered frequent attacks by the Blackfeet. During these years of Lisa's expeditions to the upper Missouri, his wife Polly and children stayed in St. Louis.

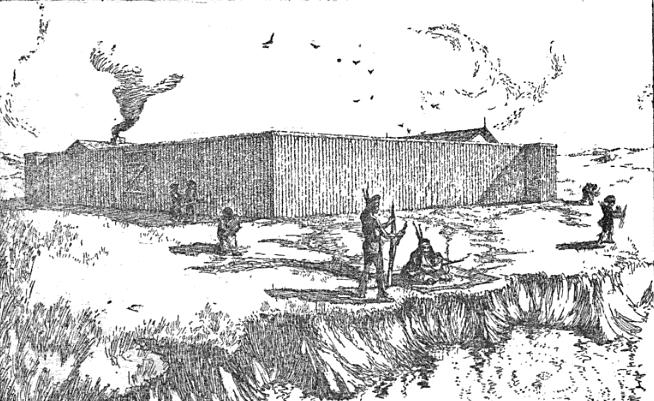
Sketch of Fort Lisa, North Dakota.

== Creation of the Missouri Fur Company ==
Upon his return to St. Louis in August 1808, Lisa established the Missouri Fur Company (sometimes referred to as the St. Louis Missouri Fur Company), a joint venture with Jean Pierre Chouteau, Pierre Chouteau, Jr., William Clark, Andrew Henry, Francois Marie Benoit, and other prominent St. Louis fur traders. Jean Pierre Chouteau had also come from New Orleans, so the two men had ties to its French and Spanish Creole community. The company was created as a temporary trust by its founders, designed to either expire or reorganize after three years.

In the spring of 1809, Lisa returned to Fort Raymond with a major expedition, made up of 350 men, about half of whom were Americans, the rest French Canadians and Creoles. They had 13 barges and keel-boats loaded with food, munitions, and articles suitable for the Indian trade, and the trip up the Missouri River was slow. Lisa transferred the fort's contents to the new company, and abandoned the isolated post.

Directing the large force of men, Lisa built the first Fort Lisa (also called Fort Manuel) near what is now Bismarck, North Dakota. It was near a Gros Ventres village between the mouth of the Little Missouri and the Knife rivers. After the new fort was constructed, Lisa returned to St. Louis in October 1809. The next year, he ascended the river to Fort Lisa and conducted more trading operations. He returned to St. Louis in the autumn of 1810.

In April 1811, Lisa began a final expedition of the Missouri Fur Company's first three years; he had two goals: to locate the then-lost fur trader Andrew Henry, and to transport the remaining property from Fort Lisa to St. Louis. The expedition became famous in its day as the company's barges heading up the Missouri overtook the rival Astor Expedition, led by William Price Hunt for the American Fur Company, which had set out three weeks earlier. Lisa remained among the Mandan and Arikara tribes until Henry came downriver, and they returned to St. Louis together at the end of 1811. In 1811 Lisa was host to the first recorded tourist to present-day South Dakota: Pittsburgh lawyer Henry Marie Brackenridge.

When the Missouri Fur Company was reorganized during the winter of 1811–1812, Lisa became more prominent among its leadership. That year he built a brick home in St. Louis as a measure of his success. (Earlier he had built a stone warehouse for his fur company, which stood until the late 1930s, when it was demolished for other development.)

In May 1812, Lisa went upriver to Fort Lisa, trading there until his return to St. Louis on June 1, 1813. Lisa happened to be at Fort Lisa in North Dakota when Sacagawea, the historic interpreter and guide for the Lewis and Clark Expedition, died at the fort on December 20, 1812. She was buried there.

On this journey he established a new fort further downriver, also called Fort Lisa, in what is now the North Omaha area of Omaha, Nebraska. Lisa at that time became the first known United States settler of Nebraska. His outpost became among the most important in the region, and the basis for the development of the major city of Nebraska.

== War of 1812 ==
In June 1812 the U.S. Congress voted to declare war on the United Kingdom. After Lisa's return to St. Louis in 1813, he heard fears expressed that British agents would encourage the upper Missouri tribes to attack settlements throughout the northern and western territories. The war disrupted the fur trade with the northern tribes on both sides of the border; in 1813 the British and American Indian allies burned Fort Lisa of North Dakota. Like other traders, Lisa had to suspend his operations for the period of the war.

Early in 1814, William Clark, governor of the Missouri Territory, appointed Lisa as US Indian Agent to the tribes located above the mouth of the Kansas River, at an annual salary of $548. Lisa set out for Fort Lisa of Nebraska, where he secured alliances between the United States and Missouri-area tribes, such as the Omaha and Ponca. He was especially effective among the Teton Sioux further upriver in present-day Minnesota, whom he organized to send war parties against tribes allied with the British. While securing these alliances, in 1814 Lisa took Mitain as a consort; she was the daughter of Big Elk, the principal chief of the Omaha people. (Lisa was still legally married to Polly, his first wife, but European-American men often took "country wives" among their Native American allies to build their relationships.)

Later, the U.S. government recognized Lisa, calling his efforts as a "great service in preventing British influence" in the northern area. After the war's conclusion in 1815, Lisa renewed his yearly trade expeditions to the area, staying each winter at Fort Lisa, Nebraska. He eventually had two children with Mitain: Rosalie and Christopher.

== Later life ==
After the war, Lisa's reputation in St. Louis improved as a result of his success in the fur trade and having aided the Americans. In 1815, he invited 43 Native American chiefs and headmen from various tribes living between the Mississippi and Missouri to the city to strengthen their alliance with the Americans, and entertained them for about three weeks. He conducted them to Portage des Sioux to meet with the commissioners William Clark, Edwards and Auguste Chouteau to sign treaties of friendship. About two years later, he hosted another 24 chiefs from the Pawnee, Missouri and Sioux before another treaty signing.

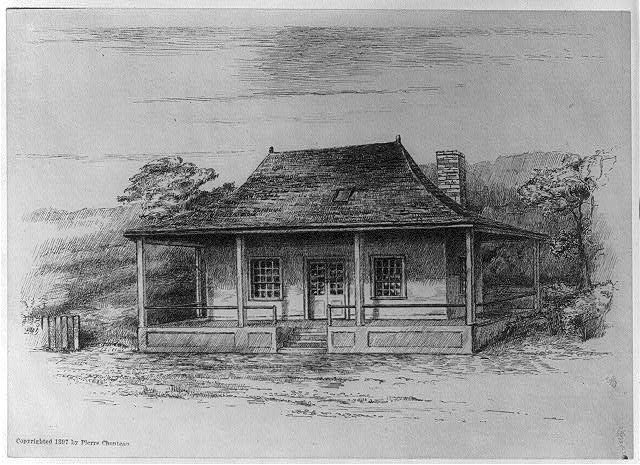
Lisa's house in St. Louis

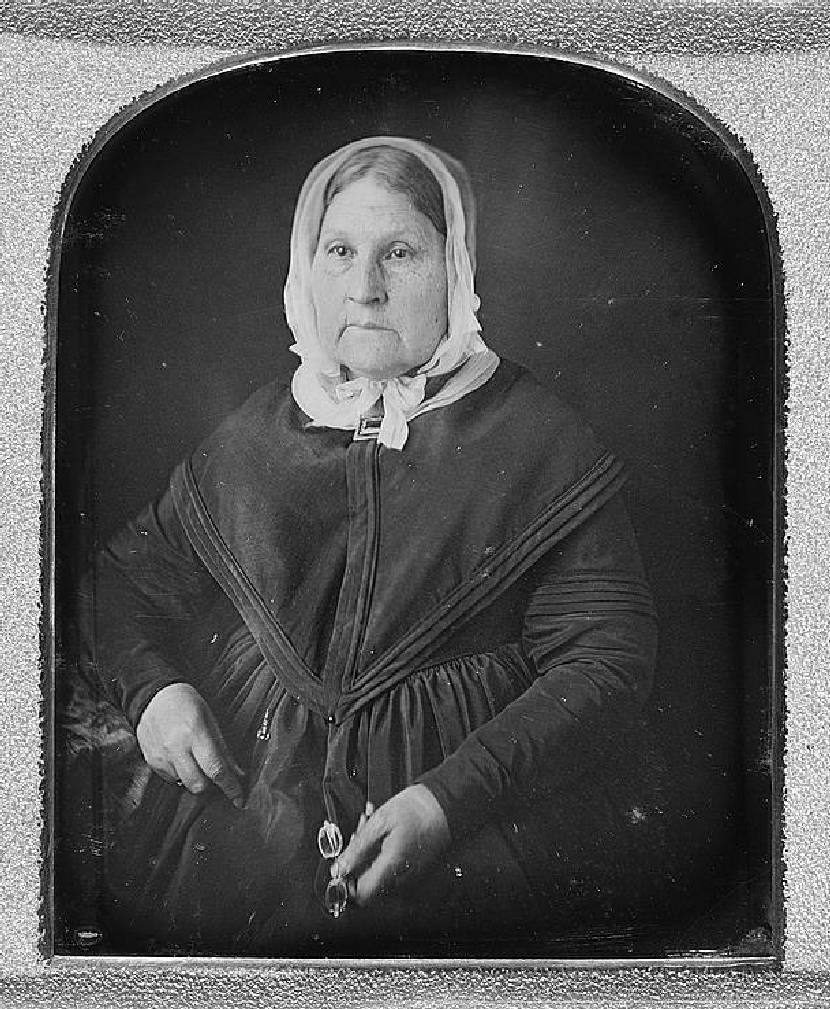
Mary Manuel Lisa

In St. Louis, Lisa was considered an ally of the landed elite. He became more affiliated with leading American members of St. Louis, including Edward Hempstead, a land claims attorney, and Thomas Hart Benton, editor of the St. Louis Enquirer. In the fall of 1817, while the trader was on an expedition up the Missouri, his first wife Polly Lisa died.

In 1818 Lisa was with most of the residents in St. Louis who turned out to welcome the newly assigned Bishop Louis William Du Bourg. He had decided to make St. Louis the seat of the diocese of Louisiana and the Floridas. Lisa and other Creole families pledged substantial funds to build a church (now called the Old Cathedral) near the river that was fit for the diocese. After his return from that year's expedition, on August 5, 1818, Lisa married the widow Mary Hempstead Keeny (a sister of Edward Hempstead). As a measure of Lisa's social standing, Pierre Chouteau was a witness at his second wedding.

After living a year in St. Louis, Lisa took Mary with him for the winter of 1819–1820 to Fort Lisa in Nebraska (Mary Lisa reportedly became the first woman of European descent to travel so far up the Missouri River). When he and Mary arrived, Lisa sent his second wife Mitain away from the fort.

By the time of his 1819 expedition, Lisa had developed strong relationships with the Omaha, Ponca, Yankton and Teton Sioux, Mandan and Arikara peoples. He was instrumental in extending the "commercial outreach of St. Louis" to the Yellowstone and Bighorn rivers and to tribes previously more under British influence. By 1829 the Missouri Fur Company had invested capital of about $10,000, highest among the local firms.

Although Lisa returned to St. Louis in good health in April 1820, he soon became ill. The unidentified illness caused his death at Sulphur Springs (now within the city of St. Louis) on August 12, 1820. He was buried at Bellefontaine Cemetery at the Hempstead family plot. Although his will provided for $2000 for each of his children upon reaching adulthood (including those by Mitain), there is no evidence that they received any money. The historian Chittenden believed Lisa left few assets to his estate.

After his death, Joshua Pilcher led the Missouri Fur Company to do business under various names until about 1830. By 1830, John Jacob Astor had gained a monopoly with his American Fur Company. As the fur trade had been declining overall with changes in taste, Pilcher dissolved the Missouri Fur Company.

== Establishments ==
Manuel Lisa was responsible for constructing at least seven forts as trading posts in the American West. They included:

- Fort Lisa in present-day Omaha, Nebraska (1812–1820)
- Fort Mandan in present-day North Dakota (1810–1812)
- Fort Raymond in present-day Montana (1807–1810)
- Fort Henry at 3 Forks near present-day Three Forks, Montana (1810)
- Fort Henry on the Snake River tributary called Henry's Fork in Montana (1810–1813)
- Cedar Island in the present-day Lake Francis Case in South Dakota (1810-?)
- Fort Manuel in the present-day Lake Oahe in South Dakota (1810-?)

== See also ==
- List of fur trading post and forts in North America
- Fur trading

== Sources ==
- Bieder, Robert E. (March 1999). "Sault Ste. Marie and the War of 1812". Indiana Magazine of History. 95 (1). Bloomington, Indiana: Indiana University Department of History: 1–13.
- Chittenden, Hiram Martin (1902), The American Fur Trade of the Far West, New York: F.P. Harper Co.
- Goodwin, Cardinal (February 1917). "Manuel Lisa". The Overland Monthly. 68 (2). San Francisco, California: Overland Monthly Publishing Co.: 151–155.
- Oglesby, Richard E. (1963), Manuel Lisa and the Opening of the Missouri Fur Trade, Norman, Oklahoma: Oklahoma University Press
- Primm, James Neal (1998), Lion of the Valley: St. Louis, Missouri, 1764-1980, St. Louis, Missouri: Missouri Historical Society Press, ISBN 9781883982249
- Robeson, George F. (January 1925). "Manuel Lisa". The Palimpsest. 6 (1). Des Moines, Iowa: State Historical Society of Iowa. doi:10.17077/0031-0360.24921.
- Sheldon, A.E. (1904), Semi-Centennial History of Nebraska, Lincoln, Nebraska: Lemon Publishing Co.
- Smith, Ambrose C. (1870), Memorials of the Life and Character of Mary Manuel Lisa, Philadelphia: J. B. Lippincott & Co.
- "A Bittersweet Homecoming (Excerpts from Lewis and Clark's Journal)". Smithsonian Magazine. Washington, D.C.: Smithsonian Magazine. August 2005. Archived from the original on 17 June 2011.
