= Missouri Fur Company =

19th-century fur trading company in Missouri

- Type: Private
- Industry: Fur trade
- Founded: St. Louis, Missouri, U.S. (February 24, 1809)
- Founder: Manuel Lisa, Jean Pierre Chouteau, William Clark
- Defunct: June 1, 1830
- Fate: Dissolved
- Successor: None
- Headquarters: St. Louis, Missouri
- Area served: Louisiana Territory

The Missouri Fur Company (also known as the St. Louis Missouri Fur Company or the Manuel Lisa Trading Company) was one of the earliest fur trading companies in St. Louis, Missouri. Dissolved and reorganized several times, it operated under various names from 1809 until its final dissolution in 1830. It was created by a group of fur traders and merchants from St. Louis and Kaskaskia, Illinois, including Manuel Lisa and members of the Chouteau family. Its expeditions explored the upper Missouri River and traded with a variety of Native American tribes, and it acted as the prototype for fur trading companies along the Missouri River until the 1820s.

== Creation of the company ==
Members of the Lewis and Clark Expedition brought back tales of the riches of the upper Missouri River when they returned to St. Louis in 1806. They reported the region's abundance of beaver at a time when demand for fur was high, fueled by the fashion of beaver hats. A recent arrival to St. Louis, trader Manuel Lisa heard the reports and made his first fur-trading expedition to the upper Missouri. He partnered with Pierre Menard and hired several veterans of the Corps of Discovery, including the legendary trapper and guide John Colter and George Drouillard. They set out in 1807 and established Fort Raymond at the confluence of the Bighorn and Yellowstone rivers in present-day Montana. Returning to St. Louis from this expedition in August 1808, Lisa reported to merchants there about the potential of the region for fur trading.

On February 24, 1809, Lisa and other prominent fur traders from the St. Louis area formed an association company; its members included Benjamin Wilkinson (nephew of Louisiana Territorial Governor James Wilkinson), Jean Pierre Chouteau (son of St. Louis co-founder René Auguste Chouteau), Auguste Pierre Chouteau (son of Jean Pierre Chouteau), Reuben Lewis (brother of Meriwether Lewis), William Clark (co-captain of the Lewis and Clark Expedition), Pierre Menard, Andrew Henry, Sylvester Labadie, William Morrison, and Andrew Fitzhugh. The articles of association, signed on March 9, 1809, defined the roles of the company's partners: Lisa and Wilkinson were named as field traders, Clark was listed as agent in St. Louis, and no members were permitted to trade outside their role as company members. The company acquired the equipment and posts of its members' private fur operations (including Fort Raymond); capital resources totaled at least $40,000. Among the equipment and supplies to be traded with Native Americans for furs were guns, ammunition, and whiskey. The fledgling Missouri Fur Company defined its field of operations as the entire Missouri River valley upriver from the Platte River.

== Company expeditions and reorganizations ==
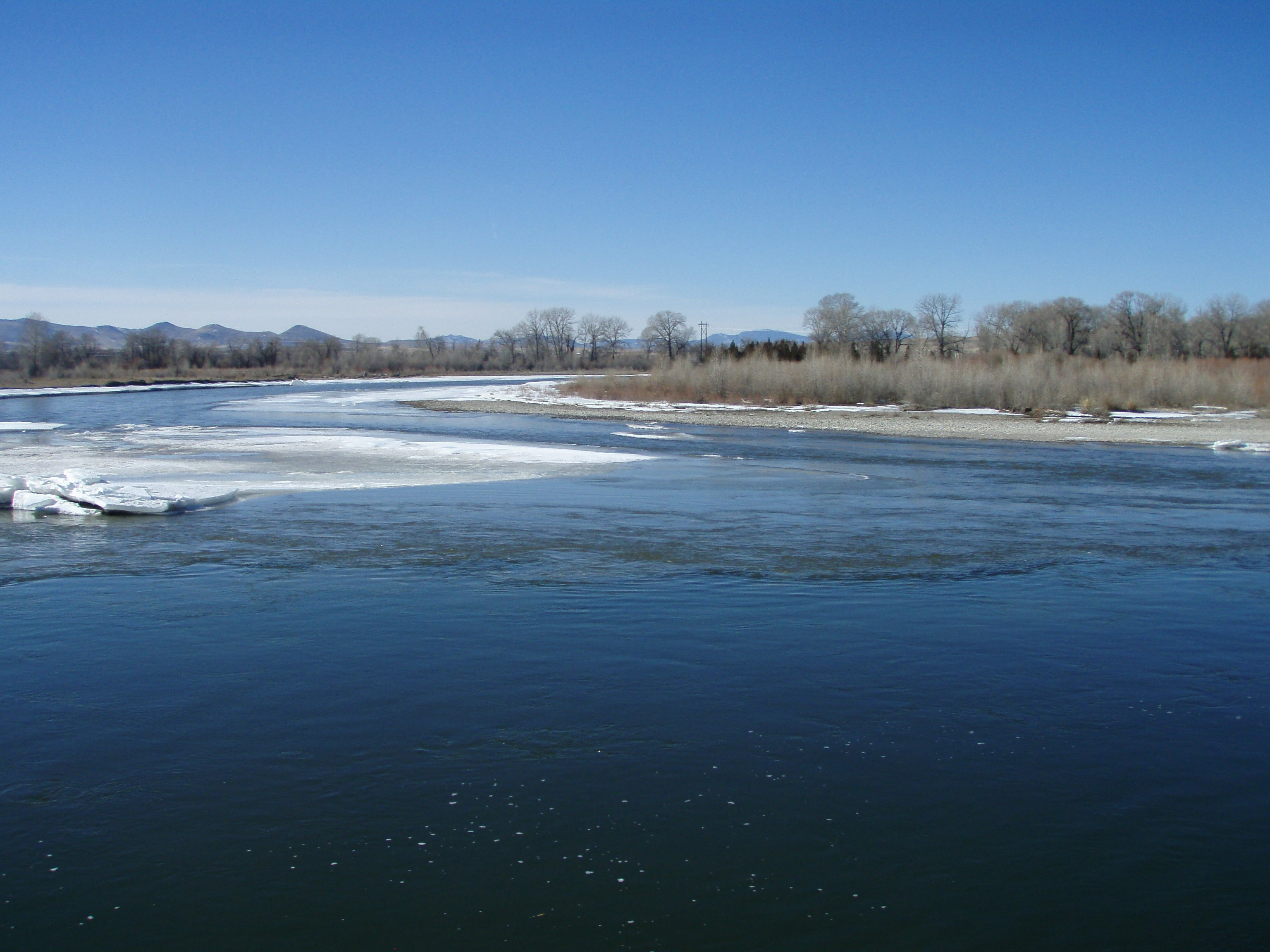
Three Forks of the Missouri, near the location of the April 12, 1810, attack on the Henry-Menard Expedition, in present-day Montana

=== Henry-Menard Expedition of 1809–1811 ===
The newly formed Missouri Fur Company raised enough capital to outfit a party of 350 men for trapping beaver along the headwaters of the Missouri and for trading with Indians. General Thomas James wrote a journal of how he enlisted in this expedition during his youth. In addition, the governor of Missouri Territory, Meriwether Lewis, contracted with the company to convey Mandan Chief Shehaka back to his people. The chief, wanting to meet the "Great Father" at Washington City, had accompanied Lewis and Clark when they returned from their expedition. After meeting president Thomas Jefferson, Shehaka had been stopped from returning to his people by an Arikara attack. Governor Lewis took the opportunity provided by the 1809 expedition, paying the Missouri Fur Company $10,000 to convey Shehaka to Fort Mandan.

Accordingly, two parties set out in the spring of 1809 and traveled up to the Missouri to Fort Mandan. Manuel Lisa and Pierre Chouteau returned to St. Louis in the fall after seeing Shehaka restored to his people. They left rest of the expedition in charge of Pierre Menard and Andrew Henry, who moved all the boats and supplies upriver to Fort Raymond where the expedition wintered. Contemplating what lay ahead, Menard wrote presciently to a friend, "It is said that one cannot imagine the quantity of beaver that there is, but there is the difficulty of the savage Black Feet who plunder often." Besides the danger from the Blackfeet of which Menard wrote, infighting threatened to tear apart the company. The American contingent thought that the expedition's leaders favored the French. One of the Americans, Reuben Lewis, wrote to his brother, "The heterogenious particles of which our Company are formed, some French, some Spaniards, some Americans, Some Gentlemen,... some men hired, & some upon shares altogether forms such different interest and opinions that I fear we shall not do so well as we had flattered ourselves we would."

In spite of the obstacles, Menard set out for the headwaters of the Missouri in March 1810 along with Andrew Henry, Reuben Lewis, and thirty-two other men. John Colter guided the expedition. Colter had twice escaped death at the hands of the Blackfeet, and he had vowed never to return to their territory. But the large group of men made him feel safe enough to guide the group to the Three Forks of the Missouri. The company arrived at the headwaters on April 3 and began construction of a post about two miles above the confluence of the Madison and Jefferson rivers.

As the expedition was trapping large numbers of beaver, its members expected to return to St. Louis with a substantial supply of furs that would yield a good profit. However, they had built the post at the Three Forks on Blackfeet territory without their permission, and the Blackfeet did not permit trapping on their land. Additionally, the Blackfeet disliked Lisa's having previously traded with the Crow Nation, whom they considered enemies. On April 12, 1810, a party of Blackfeet warriors attacked the traders, killing five and capturing horses, guns, ammunition, traps and furs. They attacked the party again on April 23, 1810, at which point several traders decided to return to St. Louis with Pierre Menard, while Andrew Henry was left in command of the remaining trappers. During the return journey of the Menard group, in early May 1810, George Drouillard, formerly an interpreter for the Lewis and Clark Expedition, was killed in an ambush. At one point the trappers under Henry's command at the Three Forks post were attacked by more than 200 Blackfeet warriors, and they were forced to abandon the post in late 1810.

Henry and the trappers bivouacked across the Continental Divide at a temporary trading post on the north fork of the Snake River, now known as Henry's Fork in present-day Idaho. When hunting at the new post did not yield enough food, the trappers had to kill their horses and subsist primarily on horse flesh. In the spring of 1811, the group dissolved when some members headed south toward Spanish territory and others (such as Andrew Henry) headed east toward the Missouri River valley and St. Louis. The first trade and trapping expedition of the Missouri Fur Company failed to supply the company with furs and resulted in their abandonment of Fort Lisa on the Yellowstone River.

=== Chouteau Expedition of 1810 ===
While the Henry-Menard Expedition had trouble in the upper Missouri region, Auguste Pierre Chouteau launched his own expedition to the Mandan. He lost numerous furs and a trading post among the Mandan when a fire destroyed the post. The losses of the fire led Chouteau to return to St. Louis in late 1810, where low prices for beaver furs compounded the economic failure for his expedition.

Manuel Lisa, co-founder and primary owner of the Missouri Fur Company after 1813

=== Reorganizations of 1812 and 1813 ===
Although the terms of the association were set to expire in March 1812, the officers dissolved and reorganized the company in January 1812; it had fewer of its original members and approximately $30,000 in valuation. The new company operated as a joint-stock company with ten total shares, yet share ownership was restricted to St. Louis owners. The wealthy fur merchant John Jacob Astor's offer to invest in five more shares (of $3000 each) was rejected by the association members.

In early 1812, the newly reorganized company sent an expedition with $11,000 of trade merchandise on two boats up the Missouri River. This expedition, led by Manuel Lisa, returned on September 27, 1812, with few furs and little profit. The next year's expedition was unprofitable as well, and in the fall of 1813, the association was again dissolved and reorganized.

Manuel Lisa was the primary owner of the new company, with few original members and less capitalization. At this time the company began to be called the Manuel Lisa Trading Company. Because of the outbreak of the War of 1812, he undertook few operations; news of the war reached the Louisiana Territory in 1813. The war interrupted trade with the upper Missouri River tribes until 1816, and during this time the company focused its efforts at Council Bluff. It was near there that a new Fort Lisa was constructed, in what is now North Omaha, Nebraska.

=== Reorganization of 1819 ===
After the war, in 1819, the company dissolved and was reorganized. Only Lisa remained from among the original members, with Joshua Pilcher, Thomas Hempstead (brother of Edward Hempstead, speaker of the territorial legislature), Joseph Perkins, Andrew Woods, Moses Carson, John B. Zenoni, Andrew Drips, and Robert Jones purchasing remaining shares. Lisa's last expedition departed in late 1819 and returned from Fort Lisa in the spring of 1820. After his return, Lisa unexpectedly died in St. Louis of an unknown illness in August 1820. Joshua Pilcher became the new president of the company and in 1821 tried to expand operations to the upper Missouri region. Pilcher sent an expedition to the mouth of the White River, where in the fall of 1820, the company built Fort Recovery. In late 1821 Pilcher directed the construction of Fort Benton at the mouth of the Bighorn River on the Yellowstone River, the site of the former Fort Lisa.

=== Jones' Expedition of 1822 ===
In early 1822, Pilcher sent an expedition led by Robert Jones from St. Charles, Missouri to the new Fort Benton. By the end of the year, the party had brought back more than $25,000 worth of furs to St. Louis. In early 1823, the same group left Fort Benton to negotiate with the Blackfeet for trade purposes, reaching the Three Forks by May. In late May 1823, the group met a party of Blackfeet with whom they negotiated for a new post near the Great Falls of the Missouri. Although the Blackfeet treated the Jones Expedition well, the expedition retreated back toward Fort Benton. On May 30, 1823, the same Blackfeet attacked the expedition. Pilcher wrote to the Indian agent at Fort Atkinson describing the attack:

My mountaineers have been defeated, and the chiefs of the party both slain; the party were attacked by three or four hundred Blackfoot Indians in a position on the Yellowstone River where nothing but defeat could be expected. Jones and Immell and five men were killed. The former, it is said, fought most desperately. Jones killed two Indians, and in drawing his pistol to kill a third, he received two spears to his breast. Immell was in front; he killed one Indian and was cut to pieces. I think we lost at least $15,000.

— Joshua Pilcher, Letter to Benjamin O'Fallon, U.S. Agent for Indian Affairs, July 3, 1823. (Note: The recipient is Benjamin O'Fallon.)

The surviving members of the group constructed boats to float toward Fort Vanderburgh on the Missouri River, twelve miles above the confluence with the Yellowstone River, and eventually returned to St. Louis.

== Dissolution ==
After the Jones Expedition, Pilcher dissolved the Missouri Fur Company in the fall of 1824. A new company named after Pilcher formed to take over the assets of the Missouri Fur Company, and it quickly withdrew from all former Missouri Fur Company posts above Council Bluff. The new company's trade power was limited by the expansion of rival companies such as the American Fur Company (owned by John Jacob Astor) and the Rocky Mountain Fur Company (owned by former Missouri Fur Company shareholder Andrew Henry and William Henry Ashley). Competition was not the only problem the company faced, as its suppliers and agents became increasingly unreliable.

=== Pilcher Expedition of 1827–1829 ===
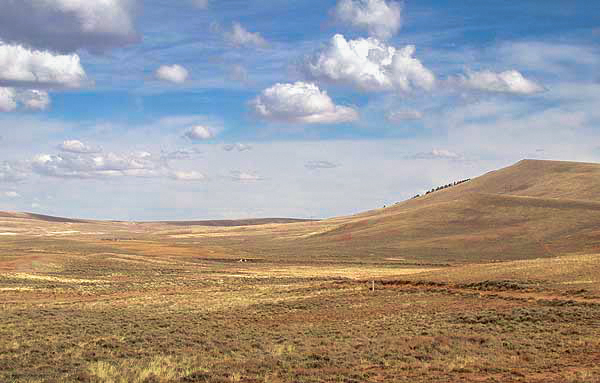
South Pass in southwestern Wyoming, where the Pilcher Expedition camped in late 1827 when its horses were stolen

Pilcher led the last expedition of the Pilcher Company, and they left Council Bluff in September 1827 heading toward the Salt Lake Valley via the Platte and Sweetwater River rivers. While they were encamped in the South Pass, all of the expedition's horses were stolen; the expedition bivouacked on the Green River for the winter. During the winter camp, water destroyed all of the expedition's trade goods. In the spring of 1828, most of the men returned to Council Bluff. Pilcher and nine others, however, bought new mounts and in August 1828 explored the Pacific Northwest to reconnoiter prospective trade routes. The group wintered at Flathead Lake, but their horses were stolen in February 1829. Seven of the nine trappers resigned to return home, and Pilcher and one other attempted to reach Fort Colville on the Columbia River. Traders at Fort Colville, then owned by the Hudson's Bay Company, offered Pilcher a return to St. Louis, which he accepted.

=== Final dissolution ===
By the time Pilcher returned to St. Louis in June 1830, he had become familiar with the Hudson's Bay Company's extensive network of British traders in Canada, as well as the operations of the powerful American Fur Company, which by this time nearly monopolized American trade. Pilcher refused to continue against such competition and, with company assets exhausted, he dissolved the Pilcher Company without an agreement and without purchase by another company. After the dissolution, most of its former traders worked for the American Fur Company, which had its western headquarters in St. Louis, but the peak of the fur trade had passed.

== See also ==
- North American fur trade
- Fur trade in Montana
- Hudson's Bay Company
- North West Company
- Pacific Fur Company
- Mountain men

== Bibliography ==
- Aarstad, Rich (Winter 2008), "'This unfortunate affair':An 1810 Letter from the Three Forks", Montana The Magazine of Western History, 58 (4): 62–67, JSTOR 25485754
- Chittenden, Hiram Martin (1902), The American Fur Trade of the Far West, New York: F.P. Harper Co.
- Conard, Howard Louis (1901), Encyclopedia of the History of Missouri, New York: Southern History Co.
- Danisi, Thomas (2009), Meriwether Lewis, Amherst, New York: Prometheus Books, ISBN 978-1-59102-702-7
- Edwards, Richard (1860), Edward's Great West and her Commercial Metropolis, St. Louis, Missouri: Edwards's Monthly
- Hebard, Grace Raymond (1911), The Pathbreakers from River to Ocean, Chicago: Lakeside Press
- Holmberg, James J. (2002), Dear Brother: Letters of William Clark to Jonathon Clark, New Haven, Connecticut: Yale University, ISBN 0-300-10106-6
- James, Thomas (1916), Three Years Among the Indians and Mexicans, St. Louis, Missouri: Missouri Historical Society, ISBN 978-0-598-28644-4
- Gen. Thomas James (11 February 2018). Three Years Among the Indians and Mexicans. CreateSpace Independent Publishing Platform. ISBN 978-1-9852-0871-1.
- Wishart, David J. (1979), The Fur Trade of the American West, Lincoln, Nebraska: University of Nebraska Press, ISBN 0-8032-9732-7
- Violette, Eugene M. (1918), A History of Missouri, Boston, Massachusetts: D.C. and Heath Co., ISBN 978-0-7222-0766-6
