= British Columbia Parliament Buildings =

Government buildings in Victoria, British Columbia

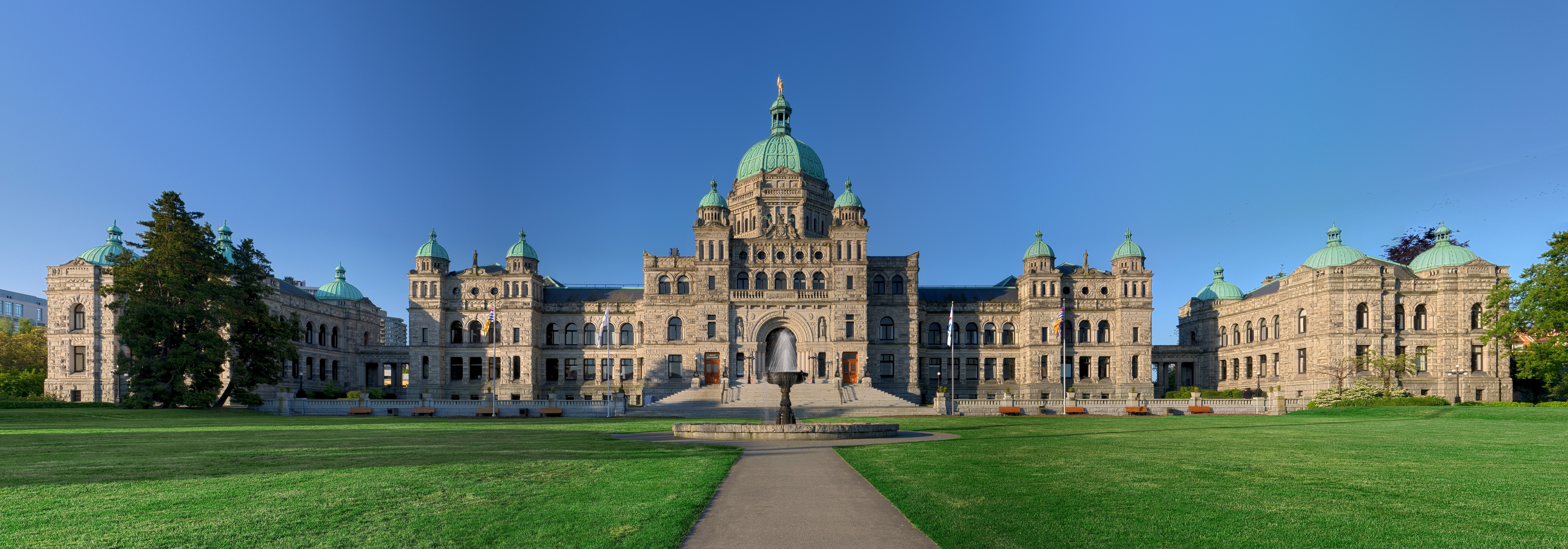
- Interactive map of the British Columbia Parliament Buildings area

General information
- Architectural style: Neo-baroque; Renaissance Revival; Romanesque Revival
- Location: 501 Belleville Street, Victoria, British Columbia, Canada
- Coordinates: 48°25′10″N 123°22′13″W
- Construction started: 1893; 133 years ago
- Completed: 1897; 129 years ago

Design and construction
- Architect: Francis Rattenbury

Website
- www.leg.bc.ca

The British Columbia Parliament Buildings are in Victoria, British Columbia, Canada, and are home to the lieutenant governor and the Legislative Assembly.

The speaker and the sergeant-at-arms are amongst those responsible for the legislative precinct, which by statute include the Parliament Buildings and grounds.

The neo-Baroque buildings face north on Belleville Street facing the Inner Harbour and diagonally across from The Empress Hotel. Atop the central dome is a gold-covered statue of Captain George Vancouver.

A statue of Queen Victoria stands on the front lawn as well the British Columbia Legislature Cenotaph commemorating the province's World War I, World War II, Korean War, and Afghanistan War dead. In front of the Queen Victoria statue is the 30-metre-tall Provincial Christmas Tree, an example of giant sequoia (Sequoiadendron giganteum), misidentified as a "coastal redwood" (Sequoia sempervirens) on the granite marker before it.

Free guided tours of the facility are offered year-round.

== History ==
From 1856 to 1860 the Legislature of the Colony of Vancouver Island met at Bachelor's Hall at Fort Victoria. From 1860 to 1898 it was housed in the first permanent building at Legislative Hall or Legislative Council Court, a two-storey wooden building along with four other buildings (Land Office, Colonial Office, Supreme Court, and Treasury) known colloquially as "The Birdcages" because of their shape (burned 1957).

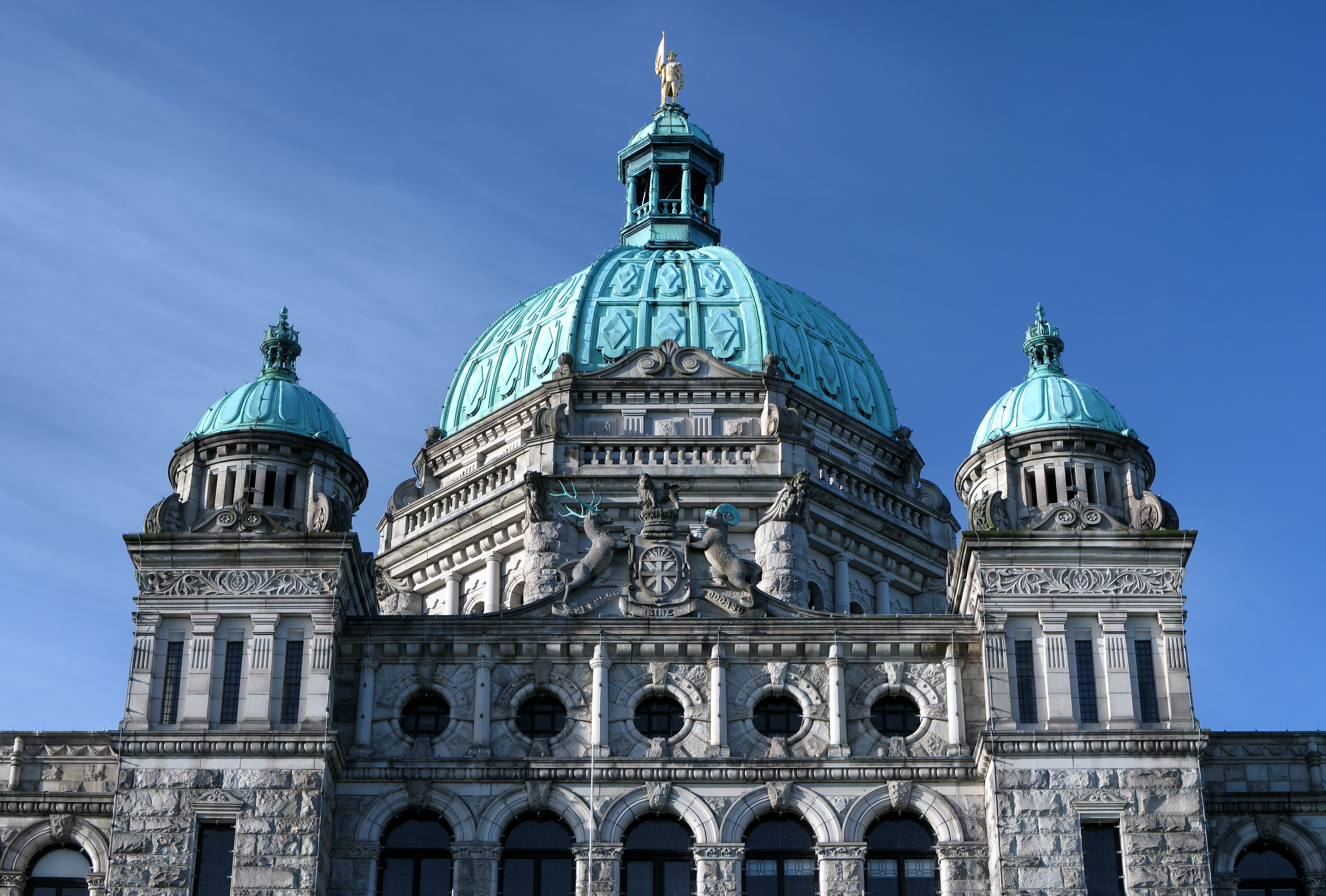
The main block combines Baroque details with Romanesque Revival rustication.

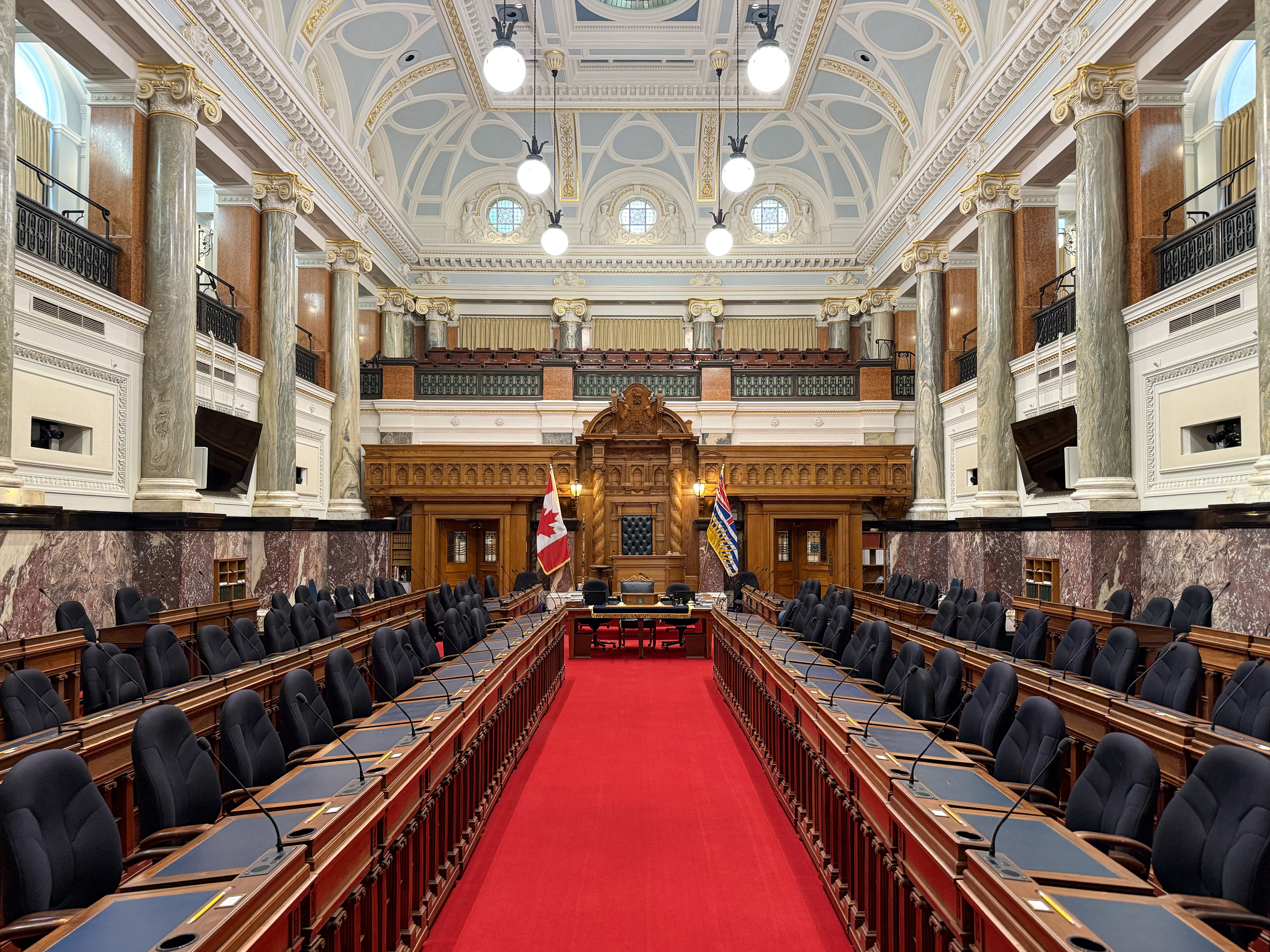
The assembly chamber

Construction of a new Parliament building was first authorized by an act of the provincial legislature in 1893, the Parliament Buildings Construction Act. The province, anxious to commemorate its growing economic, social, and political status, was engaged in an architectural competition to build a new legislative building in Victoria, after outgrowing "The Birdcages", which were notoriously drafty and leaked in wet weather. Francis Rattenbury, a recent English immigrant, 25 years old, entered the contest and signed his drawings with the pseudonym "A B.C. Architect". He progressed to the second round, signing his drawing "For Queen and Province" and eventually won the competition.

Despite many problems, including exceeding budget – the original budget was $500,000; the final amount was $923,000 – the British Columbia Parliament Buildings officially began operation in 1898. The grand scale of its 500-foot-long (150 m) andesite façade, central dome, and two end pavilions, the richness of its white marble, and combination of Baroque rigorous symmetry, use of domes and sculptural massing with the rusticated surfaces of the then-popular Renaissance style.

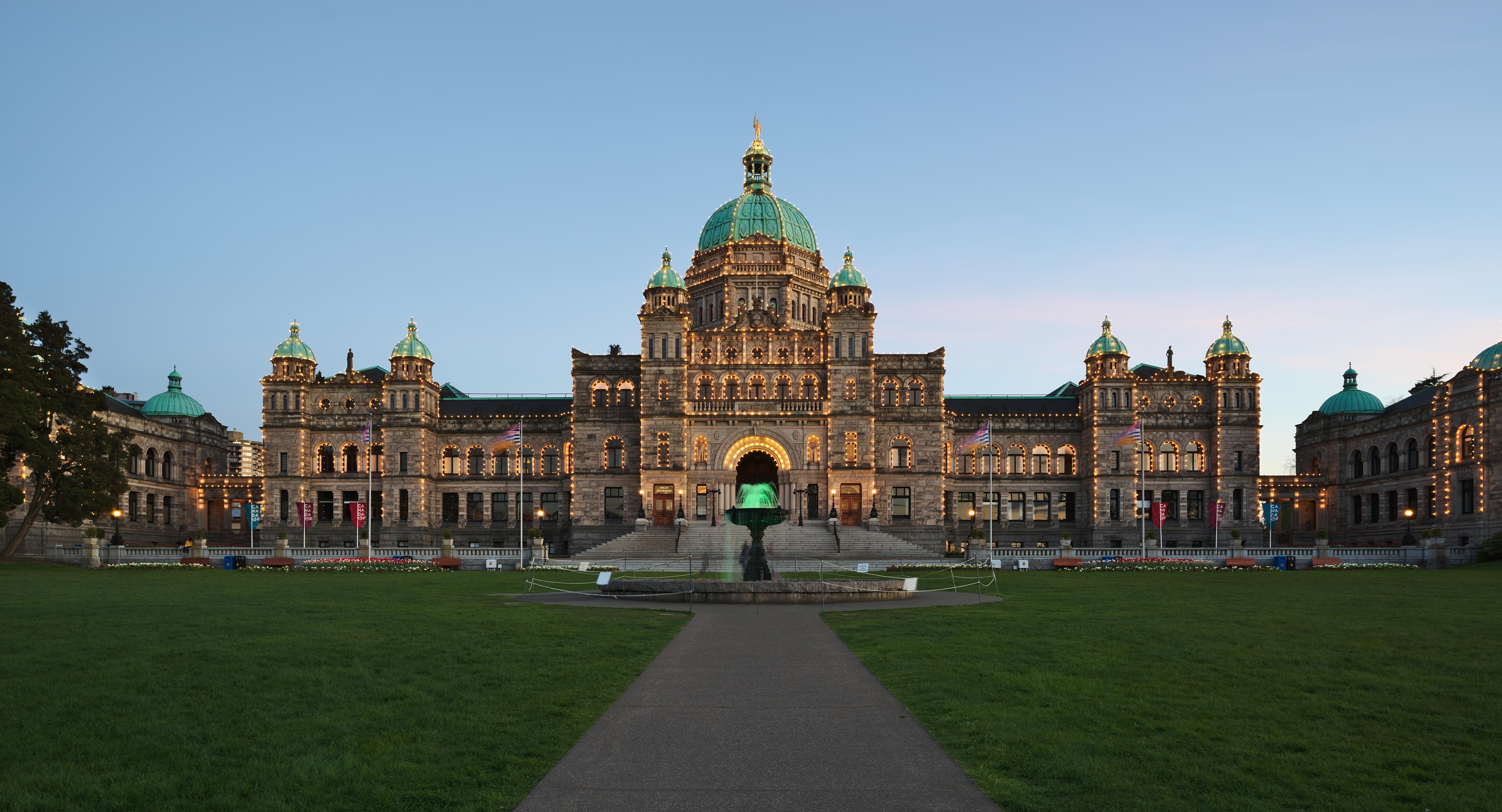
The buildings illuminated at dusk

Its success garnered Rattenbury many more commissions in Victoria and other parts of the province, including the Legislative Library (constructed between 1913 and 1915 and the cornerstone of which was laid by Prince Arthur, Duke of Connaught), the design of the Empress Hotel, the Crystal Gardens indoor swimming pool nearby, and the Vancouver Court House (now the Vancouver Art Gallery). The andesite of the British Columbia Parliament Buildings is from Haddington Island in the Alert Bay Volcanic Belt. The granite used to build the buildings came from Nelson Island, at the mouth of Jervis Inlet, on the Sunshine Coast.

Besides the elected members of the Legislative Assembly, two organizations have been granted the privilege of using the Legislative Chambers during the legislature's December recess: the British Columbia Youth Parliament (since 1924, except during its sessions of the late 1940s and early 1950s) and the British Columbia Universities' Model Parliament.

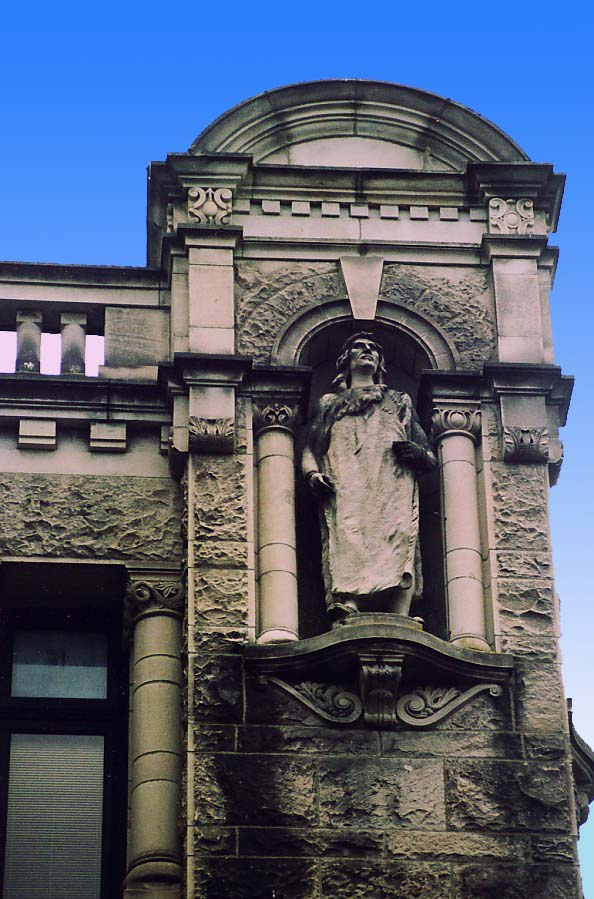
Statue of Chief Maquinna by Charles Marega

During the 1994 Commonwealth Games, free music concerts were held on the front lawns of the buildings, attracting as many as 40,000 people. Similar-sized crowds have gathered on the front lawn over the years, ranging from political protests and rallies, such as during the Solidarity Crisis of 1983, to celebrations of various kinds, including the BC150 ceremonies.

== Exterior sculpture program ==
The sculpture on the buildings was designed by the provincial librarian, E.O.S. Scholefield and executed by Charles Marega and his assistant Bernard Carrier. For the exterior of the library Marega created 14 figures: Chief Maquinna, Captain George Vancouver, Sir Matthew Baillie Begbie, Dr. John McLoughlin, Hon. John Sebastian Helmcken, Captain James Cook, Sir James Douglas, Sir Francis Drake, Sir Alexander McKenzie, Simon Fraser, Lord Lytton, Sir Anthony Musgrave, David Thompson, and Col. R.C. Moody. Carrier produced twelve figures of women, all allegorical, three around each of the building's four domes.

== Mural controversy ==
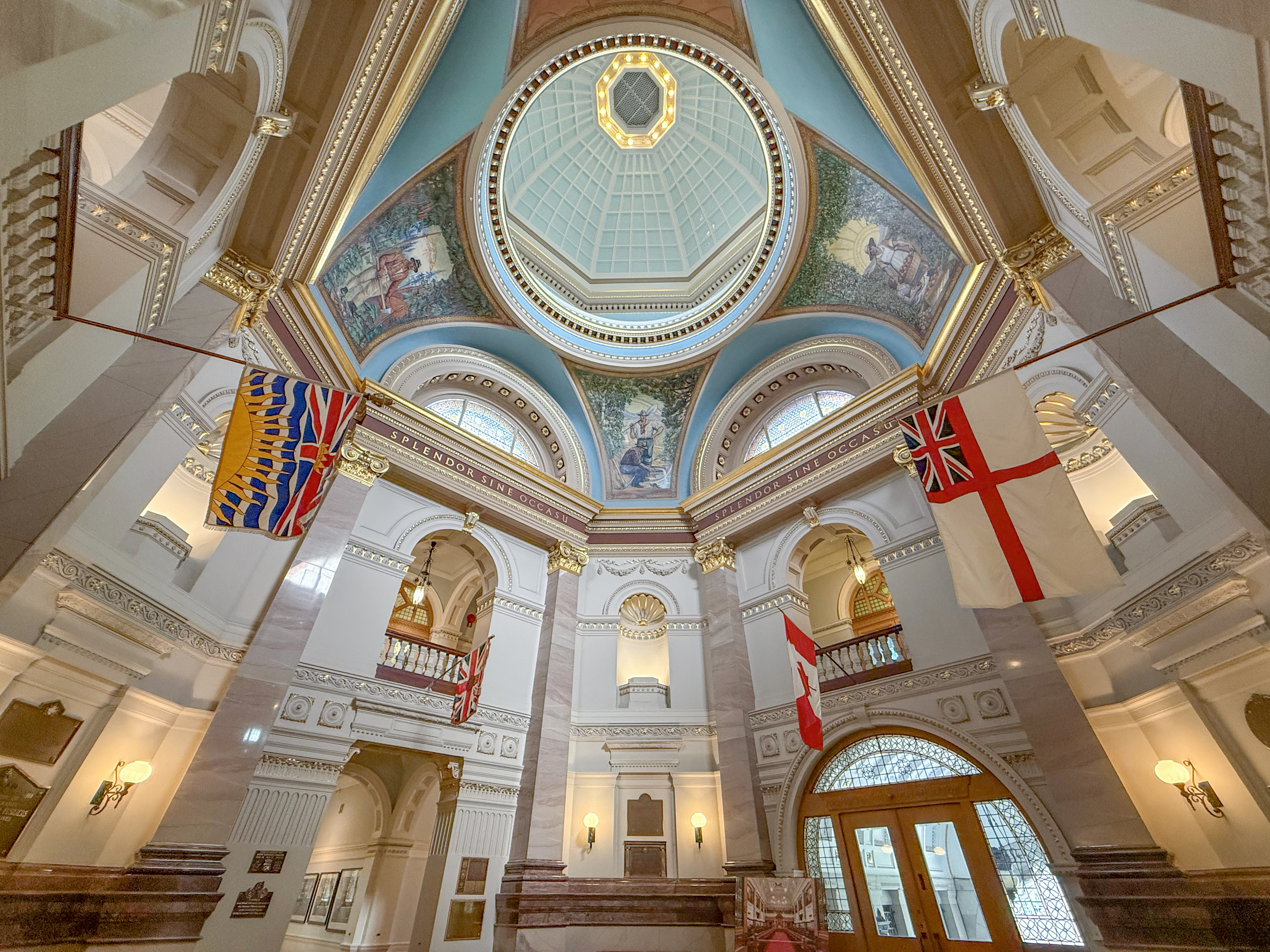
The rotunda

In 1932, artist George Southwell was commissioned to paint murals in the rotunda depicting scenes from British Columbia history from 1792 to 1843. The work was completed three years later. Decades later, controversy arose over the depiction of West Coast Indigenous peoples in the murals, which in modern times is now regarded as degrading, and amounting to cultural appropriation. One mural, entitled Labour, portrays bare-breasted Indigenous women hauling timber while a white man watches. In another entitled Justice, an Indigenous chief is shown standing before a judge (said to be Matthew Baillie Begbie), suggesting the subjugation of natives to colonial law. However, Southwell's daughter claimed that her father depicted the chief as standing before another judge, one who championed Indigenous rights.

A 2001 report, commissioned by the New Democrat government of the day, recommended that the murals be relocated to a museum where they could be given historical perspective. However, as the murals are painted on to the walls of the rotunda, the cost of removing them was estimated at $280,000. In April 2007, the legislature voted to remove murals, with only 3 of the 71 members voting against the motion. Since that vote, the murals have been fully restored and hidden from public view behind false walls.

== See also ==
- Douglas Obelisk
- Knowledge Totem Pole
- Legislative buildings of Canada
