= Héroux =

Héroux is a French surname. Notable people with the surname include:

- Alain Héroux, professional hockey player
- Denis Héroux, Quebec film director and producer
- George Arthur Heroux was one of the people on the FBI's Ten Most Wanted List during the 1950s
- George Heroux was the birth-name of baseball player George Wheeler (pitcher)
- Urbain Héroux, killer of John McLoughlin, Jr.
- Yves Héroux, professional hockey player

== See also ==
- Héroux-Devtek, a company specializing in design and manufacture of industrial and aerospace products
