= Fort Stikine =

Trading post and fortification in Alaska

Coordinates: 56°28′15″N 132°22′36″W

Fort Stikine was a fur trade post and fortification in what is now the Alaska Panhandle, at the site of the present-day of Wrangell, Alaska. Originally built as the Redoubt San Dionisio or Redoubt Saint Dionysius (Russian: Форт or Редут Святого Дионисия, r Fort or Redut Svyatogo Dionisiya) in 1834, the site was transferred to the British-owned Hudson's Bay Company as part of a lease signed in the region in 1838, and renamed Fort Stikine when turned into a Hudson's Bay Company post in 1839. The post was closed and decommissioned by 1843 but the name remained for the large village of the Stikine people which had grown around it, becoming known as Shakesville in reference to its ruling Chief Shakes by the 1860s. With the Alaska Purchase of 1867, the fortification became occupied by the US Army and was renamed Fort Wrangel, a reference to Baron von Wrangel, who had been Governor of Russian America when the fort was founded. The site today is now part of the city of Wrangell.

== Russian American Company ==
By a decree of Emperor Paul I known as the Ukase of 1799, the Russian Empire asserted ownership of the Pacific coast and adjoining lands of North America as far south as the 55th degree of latitude, with Novo-Arkhangelsk (modern Sitka) founded shortly thereafter. In 1821, Emperor Alexander issued another ukase which extended the Russian claim south to 51 degrees north, also forbidding foreign vessels from approaching within 100 Italian miles of any Russian settlement. Other powers protested and the line was withdrawn to "the line of the Emperor Paul", 55 degrees north, with parallel treaties with the United States and Great Britain (in 1824 and 1825 respectively) adjusting that southwards slightly to 54 degrees 40 minutes north so as to include all of Prince of Wales Island within Russian territory.

Under the Russo-British Treaty of 1825 (Treaty of St. Petersburg) establishing that boundary, and also establishing a land boundary northwards following the summit of the mountains, ten marine leagues from the coast, British rights to the Interior were guaranteed by Russia, along with the right of navigation of the Taku and Stikine Rivers, which were (and largely still are) the only access to those regions of what is now northern British Columbia. The HBC governing committee, led by Sir John Pelly and Sir George Simpson, on 28 October 1829 sent instructions to the Columbia Department for a company detachment to occupy the Nass River with a new trade post. Chief Factor John McLoughlin was to send the force of approximately 50 employees under Peter Skene Ogden. However the outbreak of an illness at Fort Vancouver, likely malaria, delayed the plan to establish a station until 1833. Visiting the mouth of the Nass in the summer 1831, Lieutenant Aemilius Simpson mistakenly that it was the entrance to the Babine River. HBC began to consider the location critical to establish a coastal supply chain to send provisions to Fort Babine.

=== Redoubt Saint Dionysius ===
Arvid Etholén and a party of employees of the Russian American Company (RAC) were sent to the Nass on the Chichagof on 3 April 1833 by Chief Manager Baron Wrangel. Arriving back at New Archangel on 28, Etholén reported the alarming news that Stikine people, while receptive to a Russian outpost, were also supportive a British station being established in the area. The second article of the Russo-British Treaty of 1825 specified that employees of either company couldn't land at their respective stations without prior consent. To prevent the HBC traders from accessing the Stikine river, Wrangel conceived of creating a trade post at the river's mouth. In the autumn of 1833, a party of promyshlenniki under the commander of the Chichagof, Lieutenant Dionysius Zarembo, was dispatched south. RAC employees began constructing on the Stikine Strait a fort named the Redoubt Saint Dionysius or the Redoubt San Dionisio, usually thought to have been located on Zarembo Island, to ensure control of the local fur trade, critical to the economic basis of New Archangel.

Ogden went up the Stikine on reconnaissance in 1833, finding the river too shallow for the HBC's sailing vessels. An additional exploration was ordered by in 1834 McLoughlin, with Ogden and several HBC staff, including William Fraser Tolmie, returning to the area on the brig Dryad. The employees were to begin attempts at establishing trade and a fort in the Stikine hinterland. On 20 June 1834 the HBC employees under Ogden reached Redoubt Saint Dionysius. Tolmie described the trading post as having a barricade 6 feet tall, a half completed house for the RAC officer and "a few cedarbark huts..." Discussions between the Russians and British was hampered as none of British could speak the Russian language and none of the Russians were fluent in Latin, English, or French. Zarembo gave Odgen a note in Russian that stated:

In the Year of 1834, the 18th of June. On the brig of the Columbia Company of Mr. Ogan at Stakeen—I prohibit to trade with the inhabitants of the Stakeen which have their settlements here and accordingly refer to the Convention.—To the Colonies of the Russian American Company, no permission is given to trade. I neither allow to enter the river Stakeen in consequence of the instructions received from Chief Director Baron Wrangel.

During the ensuing confrontation and what would become a naval standoff, with the ships Chichagof and Orel dispatched from New Archangel, Ogden and his men were driven off and Hudson's Bay Company stores, intended for trade and the establishment of the upriver post, were seized.

== Hudson's Bay Company ==
When news of the confrontation reached Fort Vancouver, McLoughlin was outraged and quickly sent word to the company headquarters in London. The HBC spent several years pressuring the British government to secure indemnities from the RAC on Russia for damages relating to the seizure and actions contrary to the treaty of 1825, Baron von Wrangel was forced out of office in disgrace because of the great cost in both money and prestige to the Empire. A treaty signed in 1839, known as the RAC-HBC Agreement, established the privilege for the HBC to build and maintain posts at the mouths of the Taku and Stikine as well as established a lease of the mainland and adjoining islands - the lisière from Cross Sound south to 54 degrees 40 minutes north. In return for this lease, the HBC would supply so many furs per annum to the RAC and supply the Russian American settlements with equipment, agricultural and pastoral products. Creating the subsidiary Puget Sound Agricultural Company to meet these provisions, HBC stations such as Forts Vancouver, Langley, Nisqually and Cowlitz were critical for manufacturing the produce required by the Russians.

=== Establishment of Fort Stikine ===
The following year, in 1839, James Douglas, later to be Chief Factor himself and also Governor of both Vancouver Island and British Columbia colonies, was sent north by McLoughlin to establish "Fort Stickeen" and what was formally called Fort Durham, but usually known as Fort Taku, or just Taku, under various spellings. Confrontations with the local group of Tlingit, the Shtakeen Kwaan ("Stikine Tribe") under Chief Shakes, near whose ceremonial clan house the fort had been erected, concerning control of the fur trade of the Stikine Country, led to the relocation of the principal village of that tribe to the location of the fort, and agreements with Shakes regarding control of trade in relation to other Tlingit groups and the inland Athapaskan peoples (the Tahltan, primarily) with whom the Stikines had long-standing agreements. Still, other tribes including the Haida, Nisga'a and Tsimshian traded at the post, with complicated consequences.

Much to the chagrin and horror of the company staff in charge of the post, the logistics of the fur trade resulted in an unexpected effect - an escalation of the slave trade by the Haida and Tlingits. This had an accompanying rise among the Haida and Tlingits for further warfare and raiding against each other and tribes to the south. These were done to provide goods for the purchase of furs to re-sell to the HBC post.

=== Death of John McLoughlin, Jr. ===
The second Chief Trader appointed to Fort Stikine was the son of Chief Factor McLoughlin, John McLoughlin, Jr. Unsuited to the appointment, the younger McLoughlin was unpopular with some of the Metis among the staff. Several staff members killed him on 21 April 1842 in what was alleged by them to have been in self-defense at his drunken rage. Hawaiian Kanaka employees who witnessed the killing were to testify otherwise. They alleged that the rebel staff, led by one Urbain Heroux, had conspired with the local Tlingits to seize the post.

The usual laws governing the Company and its staff were those of the Colony of Canada. However, because the murder had happened on ostensibly Russian soil, these laws did not apply in this case. George Simpson arrived five days after the murder and held a short investigation. He found the murder "justifiable homicide", and took Heroux and the others to the Russian American capital of Novo-Arkhangelsk for trial. While still at Novo-Arkhangelsk Simpson was surprised to encounter Heroux at liberty on the streets. Unlike British colonial law, the accused were free until convicted under Russian law. They were ultimately not prosecuted by Governor of Russian Colonies in America Ferdinand von Wrangel and released by the spring of 1844 for lack of evidence. John Jr.'s death was said to be one of the factors embittering his father against Simpson and the HBC.

Author Debra Komar wrote an investigative history into the death of McLoughlin Jr. named The Bastard of Fort Stikine (Goose Lane Editions 2015). In it, Komar uses both forensic science and historical research to create a narrative of both Fort Stikine and the Canadian North.

=== Closure ===
The process of increased slave raids by Tlingit and Haida was seen as a large problem by HBC management and grounds for closing the post. An additional issue seen was the viability of the local fur bearing populations, which was in question. Governor Simpson held a tour of HBC locations across North America in 1841. After he reviewed regional operations, Simpson ordered Fort Stikine and the adjacent posts of Fort McLoughlin and Fort Durham to be closed. Only Fort Simpson was to be maintained, which with the steamship Beaver was seen as able to maintain a more profitable trade in the region compared to maintaining four permanent stations. Fort Simpson was located first near the mouth of the Nass. It was later moved to a more strategic location near today's Prince Rupert, off the mouth of the Skeena (today's Lax Kw'alaams).

== Later period ==
In the company's absence, Chief Shakes took control of the post and of the Stikine River trade. Discovery of gold in the Queen Charlotte Islands in 1850, and then in the Thompson Country and Fraser Canyon in the later 1850s, led to wider encroachments and exploration by whites far beyond the locus of the Fraser Canyon Gold Rush of 1858-1861. One intrepid adventurer, Alexander "Buck" Choquette, originally from Quebec and who had been in the California goldfields, had already explored in the area of the Nass and other rivers between there and the Stikine. Equipped with an acquired proficiency in the Chinook Jargon, Choquette was at Fort Victoria when he met some of Shakes' people and persuaded them to bring him with them to the Stikine and what was left of Fort Stikine, which had by then become known as Shakesville (though still also referred to as Fort Stikine despite the absence of a formal post or a Chief Trader). Choquette was to earn the respect of Shakes and also the hand of his daughter Georgiana (or Georgie) as his wife, with the marriage consecrated according to the elaborate ceremonials of Tlingit custom.

=== Stikine Gold Rush ===
In the spring of 1861, Choquette set out on a canoe trip up the Stikine with his wife and ten warriors of the Stikines to prospect for gold, discovering it at what has been known as Buck Bar since, just southwest of Telegraph Creek (the gold-rush settlement at Telegraph Creek was, in fact, known as Buck's Bar until the construction era of the unfinished Collins Overland Telegraph). When word of Choquette's discovery reached the other goldfields and the colonial capitals, the Stikine Gold Rush was launched and hordes of men sought out the Stikine, with Fort Stikine aka Shakesville become an important port-of-call for steamboats now bound for the river's many gold-bearing bars. In response to the influx of miners, most of them (but not all) American, Governor Douglas decreed the creation of the Stikine Territory, covering the lands inland from Russian American between the line of the Nass and Finlay Rivers north to the 62nd parallel to prevent American feared American annexation of the region, just as he had created the Colony of British Columbia in similar circumstances and had witnessed the loss of the Oregon Country to American settlers previously.

Experienced from goldfields elsewhere, Choquette knew more money was to be made in provision of goods and supplies to the miner than in the workings themselves, and obtained rights to sell Hudson's Bay Company wares both at his upriver post and at a revived trading post at Shakesville. Choquette was to maintain this post in an uneasy relationship with the Hudson's Bay Company, as well as his store upriver, which relocated at various times depending on fluctuations in the activity of the rush.

Although exploration and some mining continued, the rush was well over by 1867, when the United States purchased Alaska from the Russian Empire. Despite the profitability of American trade and a wider range of goods, Choquette was faced with the decision of retaining the Hudson's Bay Company license and the freedom from American taxation that came with it by moving to just within British territory, which is to say, ten marine leagues upriver (approximately 30 km). Choosing a site opposite the Great Glacier, Choquette opened another store near the confluence of what became known as the Choquette River near the Stikine Hot Springs (see also Boundary Range). In time, Choquette would be given charge of a customs post and Hudson's Bay outlet, though opted eventually to remain at his preferred location, which he named Ice Mountain (his name for the Great Glacier).

=== Fort Wrangel ===
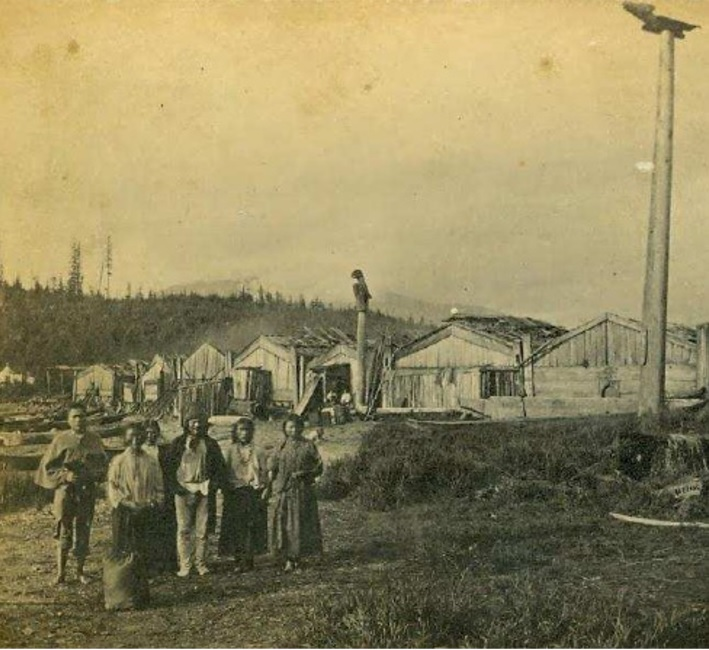
Village of Wrangel Alaska (Tlingit: Ḵaachx̱aana.áakʼw) in 1868 - in present-day Front Street.

With Choquette's departure, and the British flag with him, which had flown over his store at Shakesville, American troops took over the old fortification of Fort Stikine, renaming it Fort Wrangel. It was the second US Army post established in Alaska, the first being Fort Tongass on Tongass Island, immediately north of 54°40', but which was abandoned by 1870 as being of little real strategic or commercial value, as it was Fort Wrangel which controlled the main access inland and was therefore more viable as a customs port for the region, and Britain had shown no signs of military support for the claims that British Columbia had been making for its rights to the leased portion of the Panhandle, which had in any case been overtaken by American fishing, cannery and mining operations in the immediate aftermath of the Purchase.

The Wrangell Bombardment occurred on 25 December 1869 when a Stikine Indian named Lowan bit off Mrs. Jaboc Muller's third right finger, and was killed in an ensuing fight by soldiers who mortally wounded an additional Stikine Indian. The following morning, Scutd-doo, who was the father of the deceased, entered the fort and shot the post trader's partner Leon Smith fourteen times. Smith died some 13 hours later. The US army made an ultimatum demanding Sccutd-doo's surrender, and following bombardment of the Stikine Indian village, the villagers handed Scutd-doo over to the military in the fort, where he was court-martialed and publicly hanged before the garrison and assembled natives on 29 December, stating before he was hanged that he had acted in revenge against the occupants of the fort for the killing of Lowan and not against Smith in particular.

Fort Wrangel again became a source of tension between American and British authorities in the region when more gold was discovered near Dease Lake in 1870, leading to the Cassiar Gold Rush of 1871. Once again thousands of miners poured into and through Fort Wrangel, and the US authorities attempted to exert control over British-registered shipping heading for the Stikine. A compromise was reached, and the confrontation derailed and prevented from escalating into warfare over the region. After the Cassiar rush was over, Fort Wrangel remained as one of the main US military installations in the region, and was again to play a strategic as well as a commercial role in relation to the Stikine's use as one of the lesser routes to the Klondike from 1897 and the mounting tensions of the Alaska Boundary Dispute, which was resolved by arbitration in 1903.

== See also ==
- History of the west coast of North America
- Maritime Fur Trade

== Bibliography ==
- Watson, Bruce McIntyre (2010), Lives Lived West of the Divide: A Biographical Dictionary of Fur Traders Working West of the Rockies, 1793-1858, Kelowna, B.C.: The Centre for Social, Spatial and Economic Justice: The University of British Columbia, Okanagan
