= Urbain Héroux =

- Born: September 11, 1811; Pointe-du-Lac
- Died: October 20, 1853 (aged 42); Trois-Rivières
- Employer: Hudson's Bay Company

Urbain Héroux (September 11, 1811 - October 20, 1853) was a French-Canadian employee of the Hudson's Bay Company (HBC), stationed primarily in the Pacific Northwest in the 1830s and 1840s.

Héroux was born in Pointe-du-Lac in Lower Canada and baptized in nearby Trois-Rivières. The claim that he was Iroquois is contradicted by the documentary evidence. At the age of 20, he was caught trespassing at a building on a wharf. His original punishment was commuted on the condition he seek employment outside Lower Canada. He was hired by the Hudson's Bay Company in the spring of 1833 and sent to several interior posts. In 1837 he was reappointed to Fort Vancouver, where he met and had at least one child with a Chinookan woman. From here he would serve intermittently at Fort Vancouver, Fort Taku, and finally Fort Stikine, arriving at the final station in 1841. Fort Stikine was located within the Stikine lisière, a territory of Russian America leased to the HBC by the Russian-American Company. Among his other duties he may have served as interpreter.

During his time at Fort Stikine, he was caught stealing alcohol by William Glen Rae and later became embroiled in disputes with John McLoughlin Jr. These poor relations erupted into a confrontation that ended with John Jr.'s death on 21 April 1842. George Simpson, on a general inspection of the Columbia Department, arrived five days after the killing. After a short investigation he considered Héroux justified, and sent him to Novoarkhangelsk rather than be tried in a court in the Province of Canada or the United Kingdom. Several other men later testified that John Jr. was prone to alcoholism and apparently had tried to kill Héroux.

Héroux was released in 1843 by Chief Manager of Russian America Arvid Adolf Etholén due to Russian disinterest in the case. He was transported by the Cadboro and later the Beaver to Fort Victoria and Fort Vancouver. From there he went over the York Factory Express to Norway House. In 1846, legal authorities in Canada concluded that the expense to ship Héroux and all witnesses to the United Kingdom would be too exorbitant and instead closed the case. Simpson's official disinterest in the matter aroused great hostility in his subordinate, Chief Factor John McLoughlin, the father of the victim, and contributed to his eventual retirement from the company.

Héroux returned to Trois-Rivières and died there in 1853.

== Bibliography ==
- Knafla, Louis A. (2004). "Violence on the Western Frontier". In Ross, Jeffrey Ian (ed.). Violence in Canada: Sociopolitical Perspectives (2nd ed.). New Brunswick (USA): Transaction Publishers.
- Komar, Debra (2015), The Bastard of Fort Stikine: The Hudson's Bay Company and the Murder of John McLoughlin Jr, New Brunswick: Goose Lane Editions
- Watson, Bruce M. (2010), Lives Lived West of the Divide: A Biographical Dictionary of Fur Traders Working West of the Rockies, 1793-1858, Okanagan: The Centre for Social, Spatial and Economic Justice of the University of British Columbia
