= Amelia Douglas =

Wife of the 1st governor of the Colony of British Columbia (1812-1890)

Amelia, Lady Douglas
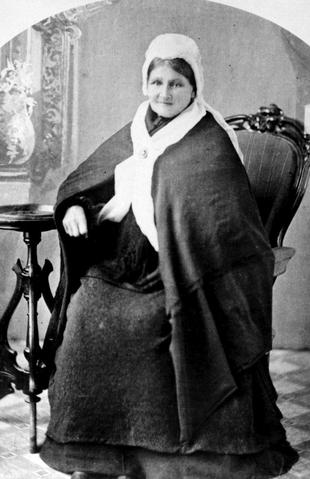
- Born: Amelia Connolly; 1 January 1812 now Manitoba, Canada
- Died: 8 January 1890 (aged 78); James Bay Community, British Columbia, Canada
- Other names: Amelia Connolly Douglas
- Occupations: Trapper, midwife
- Spouse: Sir James Douglas (m. 1828)
- Children: 13 (6 lived to adulthood), including James W. Douglas

Amelia, Lady Douglas (née Connolly; 1 January 1812 – 8 January 1890) was a Métis woman significant in the early history of Canada as the wife of the first governor of the Colony of British Columbia.

Born to a French-Irish trapper and his Cree wife, she spent her early childhood moving frequently between fur trading stations in Manitoba. When her father was promoted to factor (i.e. manager) of Fort St. James in what would later become British Columbia, she met a mixed-race trapper of Scottish and Bajan Creole heritage, who would become her husband. As he progressed from clerk to Chief Factor and governor of the Colony of Vancouver Island and later the Colony of British Columbia, she served as a nurse and midwife at his various posts. She gave birth to thirteen children, raising six to adulthood. Her children were brought up in the Victorian European style, though she ensured that they were schooled in the cultural heritage of their First Nations ancestors.

== Early life ==
Amelia Connolly was born on 1 January 1812, probably near Thompson, Manitoba (Note: Several references give Connolly's place of birth as Fort Assiniboine in Alberta, while others state Fort Churchill, Manitoba. It seems probable that she was born in Manitoba, as Adams & Adams note that her parents had moved to Nelson House in 1811 and travel while pregnant in winter to Alberta would be unlikely.) to Miyo Nipiy (Cree for Good Water) (also known as Susanna Pas de Nom, i.e. Susanna the Nameless) and William Connolly. Her father was a trapper who worked for the North West Company (NWC) from Lachine, Quebec and though he was partly of Irish heritage, the family spoke French (see Métis French). Her mother, a Cree woman, was the daughter of an influential tribal chief who lived along the Rat River. It was common in the North American fur trade for men of European ancestry to marry indigenous women à la façon du pays ("according to the custom of the country"). These common-law marriages helped solidify alliances and so formed "the basis for a fur trade society".

In Amelia's youth, the family moved often, traveling between fur trading posts. In 1818, William was made a full partner in the NWC and relocated his family to Cumberland House near the identically named trading post in Saskatchewan operated by the Hudson's Bay Company. The six siblings were multi-lingual, speaking Swampy Cree, and probably learned Saulteaux from their mother, and French with their father.

In 1821, the Hudson Bay and North West Companies amalgamated and William became a chief trader. In 1825, he would become the Chief Factor of Fort St. James in the New Caledonia District and once again relocated his family. Soon after the family's arrival, James Douglas arrived at the post to serve as a clerk to William. James was the son of Martha Ann (née Ritchie, later Tefler) a free coloured woman from Barbados, and John Douglas, a Scottish merchant and planter from Glasgow. He was born in New Amsterdam in the Dutch colony (technically the Batavian Republic) of Berbice, which within a month of his birth would be occupied by the British and soon become part of British Guiana (now Guyana). On 27 April 1828 Connolly and Douglas married in a wikihtowin arrangement, or customary marriage, which was officiated by her father. In an often-told anecdote, which changes with retelling, the new bride saved her husband from an attack by an enraged Chief Kwah, who was avenging the death of a kinsman, by tossing trade goods to compensate for the chief's loss.

== Middle life ==
In 1829, Amelia was transferred to Fort Vancouver, the headquarters of the Columbia Department in what became Vancouver, Washington (i.e. the United States). Because Amelia Douglas had given birth to their first child on 10 November 1829 and the child was sick, she did not join him until the following year, after their child died. Over the next eighteen years, while the couple lived at the fort, she bore ten more children. She was described as shy and retiring, but friendly with the other mixed-marriage wives at the fort. In part because most of the mixed-race women were not fluent in English, but also because of the prejudices of the white wives at the fort, there was little mingling between the native-born and European-born wives. There was a custom prevalent in the fort that the officers and wives entertained separately, even to dining nightly in separate spaces. In between giving birth and caring for her own children, Douglas acted as a nurse and midwife and in that capacity, served both native and white women. In 1836, with the arrival of a group of clergymen and their wives, the situation became tense, because the clergy were outspoken in their disapproval of the many common-law marriages. To avoid difficulties, on 28 February 1837 the Douglas' marriage was solemnized, in a legal ceremony held at Fort Vancouver by Reverend Herbert Beaver, according to the rites of the Church of England.

Douglas had learned to read and write, possibly from her father but more probably from James, and though she enjoyed reading, she wrote with difficulty. She taught her children until a school finally arrived at the fort in 1844, giving the girls lessons in beadwork, embroidery and sewing as well. She also told them the stories of her Cree ancestors. In 1848, the family received notice that James was to be transferred to Fort Victoria and made pro tempore governor of the new Colony of Vancouver Island. They were to depart in May 1849 and leaving their home and the burial place of the five children who had died during their tenure at Fort Vancouver was difficult for Douglas. Her most recent infant, Rebecca, was suffering from typhus and Douglas nursed her on the journey, though she would die within months of the family's arrival at their new home. They purchased land upon which they would build the first private residence on the island and Douglas befriended Josette Work, a métis of Nez Perce heritage and wife of the Chief Factor John Work. In 1851, she gave birth to her twelfth child, suffering what would later be diagnosed as consumption (tuberculosis). The following year she moved into their new home. As there had been at Fort Vancouver, racial prejudice as well as social biases caused tensions at Fort Victoria, which did not abate even when James was appointed as second governor of the colony in 1851. In 1854, Douglas gave birth to her thirteenth and last child, though like most of the other births, the baby did not survive. Of her thirteen children, only six survived beyond the age of four and only four outlived her.

In 1858, James was made the first governor of the Colony of British Columbia. The promotion placed Douglas more in the public eye and increased her desire to leave the official duties to James. The attacks on both Douglases were unrelenting, and they were "criticized for entertaining too little, for entertaining too much, and for entertaining the wrong people". The charges were somewhat ironic, as the separation of officers and wives was as marked as it had been back at Fort Vancouver. As she had at their previous posts, she served as a nurse and was fond of gardening and preserving the harvest. In 1862, John Connolly, Amelia's older brother, instituted a lawsuit against Julia Woolrich, who had inherited William Connolly's estate as his widow, after Connolly abandoned his métis family and married her. In effect, the abandonment and remarriage of their father, had rendered his children by Miyo Nipiy illegitimate. He won his initial case, and Douglas began to participate more in society. James retired in 1864 and was knighted. Thereafter, Douglas became known as Lady Douglas and was feted at a dinner in her honour held separately from her husband's tribute.

== Later life ==
Woolrich appealed the legitimacy case through the Canadian Courts of Appeals and Revision and finally to the Judicial Committee of the Privy Council in London. Between 1867 and 1869 when the appeal on the lawsuit was pending, Douglas removed herself from public scrutiny and was involved in raising her recently deceased daughter Cecelia's children. The marriage of their parents was upheld and a settlement was finally reached. The outcome improved Douglas' health and increased her sociability. She had learned to be a proper Victorian wife, wore European fashions and participated in the customs traditional for ladies of the era, such as nursing, care of the poor, and even parlour games. Her youngest daughter, Martha was sent to England for schooling and when Sir James died in 1877, Martha returned to live with her mother. Douglas retired from society and spent her remaining years in the company of her family, relating legends and stories of her Cree ancestry to her grandchildren.

== Death and legacy ==
Douglas died on 8 January 1890 in the James Bay Community, British Columbia, Canada. Flags were flown at half-mast, the day following her death and her funeral, held on 15 January was widely attended. She was buried in the Ross Bay Cemetery. In 1992, Douglas College, in New Westminster opened an art gallery named in her honour. Douglas' life adds to the historical record as in many ways it is similar to the experiences of other mixed-blood women, while at the same time, it allows an evaluation of the societal and racial prejudices against métis women even at the upper levels of society.
