= Connolly v Woolrich =

1867 legal case

Connolly v Woolrich (1867), 17 RJRQ 75, 11 Low Can Jur 197, is a decision in which the Quebec Superior Court held that a marriage under Cree law could be recognized under Quebec law.

In 1803, Suzanne, a Cree woman (born Miyo Nipiy), married William Connolly, a North West Company employee in the district of Athabasca. They married in accordance with Cree law under wikihtowin and lived together for over 20 years. William eventually left Suzanne (under Cree law & custom, the husband is free to repudiate his wife unilaterally), and married Julia Woolrich, his second cousin, for which he needed a dispensation from the Archbishop of Quebec.

Under Cree law & custom, the consent of the woman to marry is not required; the man must obtain the consent of her father. Moreover, the Cree practiced polygamy, and a marital union was not "indissoluble" as it was for Catholics, who followed both canon law (which prohibits divorce) and the 1866 Civil Code of Lower Canada (which emulates the French Civil Code which in turn had abolished divorce previously permitted under the Napoleonic Code).

Such mixed unions were known in Lower Canada at the time as "mariage à la façon du pays." It is not clear whether this judgment was not a true precedent because it simply recognized a "foreign" marriage as is a customary principle of private international law, or whether it genuinely legitimized a "common law union." The English definition of marriage as the union of a man and a wife to the exclusion of all others for life never applied in Lower Canada; all the 1866 Civil Code required was that the male be 14 years of age and the female 12 years of age.

One of William's sons with Suzanne later sued for a portion of William's estate. The Quebec Superior Court thus had to decide whether a marriage under Cree law could be recognized in Quebec. It decided that it could, a result that was affirmed on appeal. In deciding for the plaintiff, the court held that the Crown's declaration of sovereignty in Canada did not negate "the territorial rights, political organization, such as it was, or the laws and usages of the Indian tribes".

Connolly is considered a leading case, although its value as a precedent is unclear because the events giving rise to the decision took place when neither Canada nor the British Empire had passed legislation governing the Northwest Territories. John Borrows argues, however, that Connolly "affirmed the existence of Cree law on the prairies and recognized it as a part of Canadian law".

== Sources ==
- Carter, Sarah (2008). The Importance of Being Monogamous: Marriage and Nation Building in Western Canada to 1915. The University of Alberta Press. ISBN 1-897425-19-8. OCLC 1032166142.
