= Alexander Dallas =

Alexander Dallas may refer to:

- Alexander Grant Dallas (1816–1882), British governor of Rupert's Land and Hudson's Bay Company administrator
- Alexander J. Dallas (statesman) (1759–1817), American Secretary of the Treasury under President James Madison
- Alexander J. Dallas (United States Navy officer) (1791–1844), U.S. Navy officer (son of the statesman)
- Alexander Dallas (priest) (1791–1869), Church of England priest founder of the Irish Church Missions to Roman Catholics

== See also ==
- Alexander Dallas Bache (1806–1867), American physicist
