= John McLoughlin =

Hudson's Bay Company figure in Oregon (1784–1857)

John McLoughlin KCSG
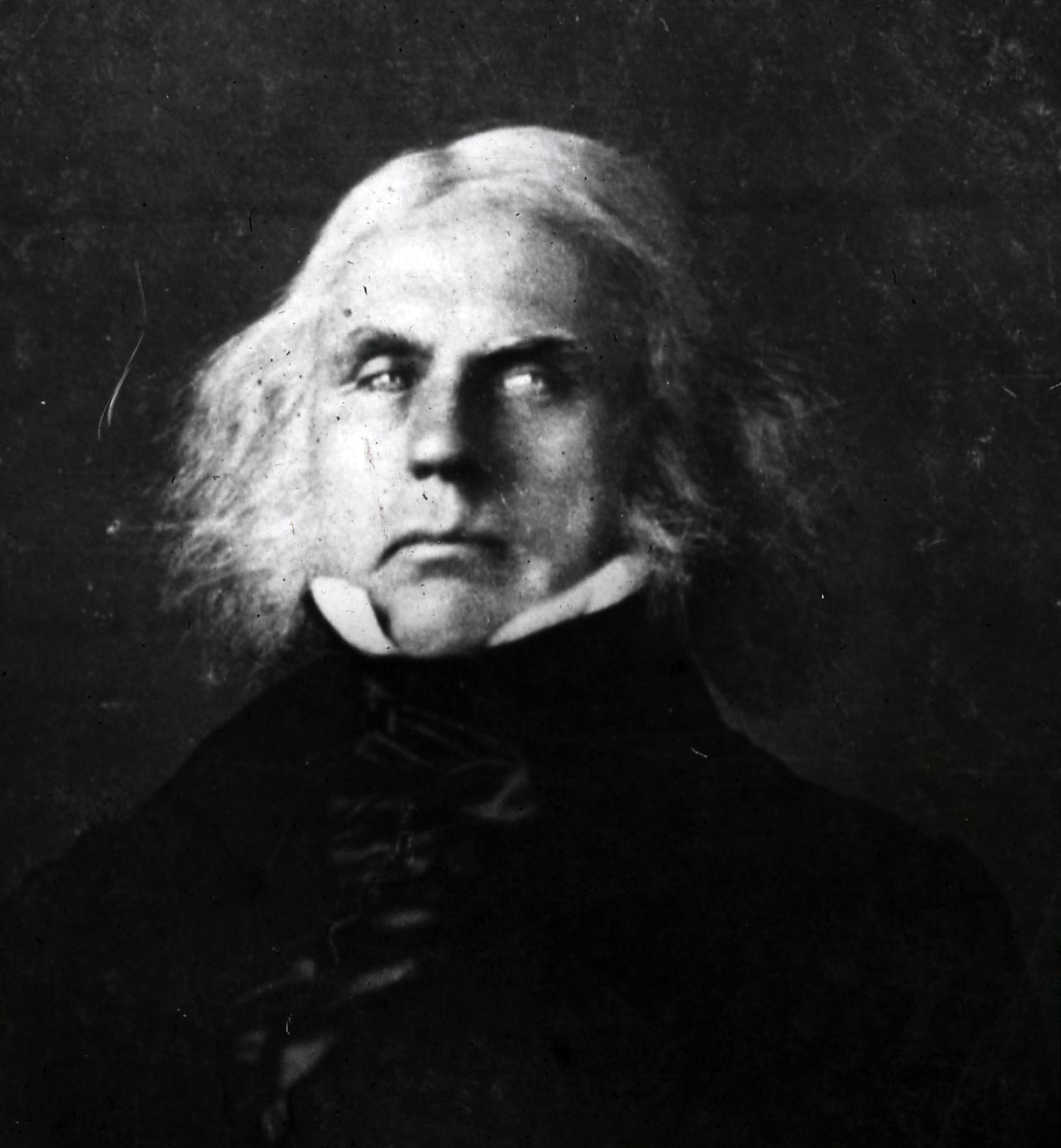
- Digital photograph made from a lantern slide of Dr. John McLoughlin
- Born: Jean-Baptiste McLoughlin; October 19, 1784; Rivière-du-Loup, Quebec
- Died: September 3, 1857 (aged 72); Oregon City, Oregon Territory
- Occupations: Fur trader, physician and merchant
- Years active: 1803–1844
- Employer(s): Hudson's Bay Company and North West Company
- Known for: Fort Vancouver and Fort William, Ontario
- Title: Chief Factor of the Columbia District
- Term: 1824–1845
- Successor: James Douglas
- Spouse: Marguerite Waddens (m. 1842)
- Children: 3, including John McLoughlin Jr.

John McLoughlin, baptized Jean-Baptiste McLoughlin, (October 19, 1784 – September 3, 1857) was a French-Canadian, later American, Chief Factor and Superintendent of the Columbia District of the Hudson's Bay Company at Fort Vancouver from 1824 to 1845. He was later known as the "Father of Oregon" for his role in assisting the American cause in the Oregon Country. In the late 1840s, his general store in Oregon City was famous as the last stop on the Oregon Trail.

== Early days ==
McLoughlin was born in October 1784 in Rivière-du-Loup, Quebec, and was of Scottish and French Canadian descent. He lived with his great uncle, Colonel William Fraser, for a while as a child. Though baptized Roman Catholic, he was raised Anglican. In his later life, he returned to the Roman Catholic faith.

In 1798, he began to study medicine under Sir James Fisher of Quebec. McLoughlin was granted a licence to practice medicine in Lower Canada (now Quebec) in 1803. He evidently completed his course, as he is widely referred to as "Dr. John McLoughlin".

== North West Company ==
McLoughlin was hired as a physician at Fort William, the inland headquarters and a fur trade post of the North West Company on Lake Superior. There he became a trader and mastered several Indian languages. In 1814, he became a partner in the company.

In 1816, McLoughlin was charged with complicity in the massacre at the Red River Colony after the Battle of Seven Oaks. He and all the other parties from the North West Company were exonerated. The Hudson's Bay Company was found culpable by the appointed Royal Commissioner at its trial on October 30, 1818, and in the later prosecutions by Lord Selkirk and the successful counter-suits.

McLoughlin was instrumental in the negotiations leading to the North West Company's 1821 merger with the Hudson's Bay Company. He was promoted to head the Lac la Pluie district temporarily shortly after the merger.

== Hudson's Bay Company ==
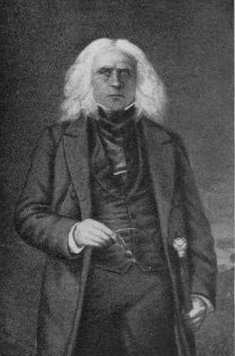
John McLoughlin

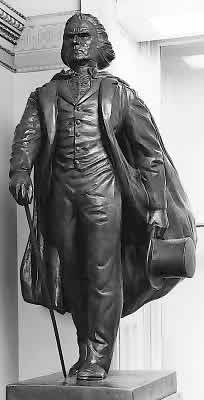
John McLoughlin, National Statuary Hall Collection, statue

In 1824, the Hudson's Bay Company appointed McLoughlin, already a Chief Factor, as Superintendent of the Columbia Department (roughly parallel to what Americans know as the Oregon Country), and Peter Skene Ogden was appointed to assist him. At the time, the region was under joint occupation of both the United States and Britain pursuant to the Treaty of 1818. Upon his arrival, McLoughlin determined that the headquarters of the company at Fort Astoria (now Astoria, Oregon), at the mouth of the Columbia River, was unfit. The York Factory Express trade route had evolved from an earlier express brigade used by the North West Company between Fort George, founded in 1811 by John Jacob Astor's American Fur Company) at the mouth of the Columbia River, to Fort William on Lake Superior.

In the 1821 merger with the North West Company, the Hudson's Bay Company gained control of North West Company trading posts west of the Rocky Mountains. They established headquarters at Fort George (formerly Astoria). George Simpson, Governor of Hudson's Bay Company, visited the Columbia District in 1824–25, journeying from York Factory. He investigated a quicker route than previously used, following the Saskatchewan River and crossing the mountains at Athabasca Pass. This route was thereafter followed by the York Factory Express brigades.

=== Fort Vancouver ===
McLoughlin built Fort Vancouver as a replacement for Fort George, on the north side of the Columbia River, a few miles upstream from the confluence of the Columbia and Willamette Rivers. The site was chosen by Sir George Simpson. The post was opened for business on March 19, 1825. From his Columbia Department headquarters in Fort Vancouver, McLoughlin supervised trade and kept peace with the Indians, inaugurated salmon and timber trade with Mexican-controlled California and Hawaii, and supplied Russian America with produce.

Fort Vancouver became the center of activity in the Pacific Northwest. Every year ships would come from London to drop off supplies and trade goods in exchange for the furs. It was the nexus for the fur trade on the Pacific Coast; its influence reached from the Rocky Mountains to the Hawaiian Islands, and from Russian Alaska into Mexican-controlled California. From Fort Vancouver, at its pinnacle, McLoughlin watched over 34 outposts, 24 ports, six ships, and 600 employees. Under McLoughlin's management, the Columbia Department remained highly profitable, in part due to the ongoing high demand for beaver hats in Europe. John McLoughlin was worried Fort Vancouver would be attacked and plundered of its heavy stock of supplies, due to its proximity to the Willamette Valley, in which there was already an American settlement of some size.

McLoughlin was also involved in the building of the first sawmill on the West coast, which was accomplished in 1827 with machinery imported from London. Much of its wood was exported to Hawaii, although some also went into California.

=== York Factory Express ===
By 1825, there were usually two brigades from opposite ends of the route, (Fort Vancouver in the Columbia District on the lower Columbia River and the other from York Factory on Hudson Bay), that set out in spring and passed each other in the middle of the continent. Each brigade consisted of about forty to seventy-five men and two to five specially made boats that traveled at breakneck speed (for the time). These brigades often needed help from Indians, who would help the men portage around falls and unnavigable rapids; in return, the Indians were paid with trade goods. An 1839 report cites the travel time as three months and ten days—almost 26 miles (40 km) per day on average. The brigades used boat, horseback, and backpacks to bring the supplies in and furs out to the forts and trading posts along the route.

=== Puget Sound Agricultural Company ===
The Hudson Bay Company officially discouraged settlement because it interfered with the lucrative fur trade. Two developments in the late 1830s made a reappraisal of Hudson's Bay Company operations in the Columbia Department necessary. Apprehensions about American antagonism rose due to US Senator Lewis F. Linn, who in 1838 called for a naval force to be dispatched to the Columbia River, although the measure never passed. Favorable relations with the Russian-American Company (RAC) were established with the signing of the RAC-HBC Agreement in 1839.

To meet the new commercial obligations and to support British claims in the Oregon Question, the Hudson's Bay Company formally incorporated the Puget Sound Agricultural Company (PSAC) subsidiary in 1840. The new venture, while nominally independent, was administratively included within the Columbia Department. McLoughlin criticized the idea of a fur trading monopoly maintaining agricultural operations, as he felt independent farmers would be efficient. Nonetheless, he was appointed as the PSAC supervisor.

The fertile plains near the Cowlitz River were selected as a suitable location for Cowlitz Farm, the principal PSAC farm. Fort Nisqually was also assigned to the PSAC, where numerous livestock herds were maintained. Several locations were considered for potential farmers, including among the French Canadian and Métis farmers of the Willamette Valley, Scotland, and the Red River Colony.

In November 1839, Sir George Simpson instructed Duncan Finlayson to begin promoting the PSAC among the Red River colonists. James Sinclair was appointed by Finlayson to guide the mostly Métis settler families to Fort Vancouver. In June 1841, the party left Fort Garry with 23 families consisting of 121 people. When they arrived at Fort Vancouver, they numbered 21 families of 116 people. Fourteen families were relocated to Fort Nisqually, while the remaining seven families were sent to Fort Cowlitz.

=== Japanese shipwreck ===
When three Japanese sailors, among them Otokichi, were shipwrecked on the Olympic Peninsula in 1834, McLoughlin thought they might present an opportunity to open trade with Japan. He sent the three men to London on the Eagle to try to convince the Crown of his plan. They reached London in 1835, probably the first Japanese to do so since the 16th-century Christopher and Cosmas. When the British government did not show interest, the castaways were sent to Macau so that they could be returned to Japan. Even that was not possible, as Japan did not allow any outside ships to enter its waters.

== Relations with American settlers ==
In 1821, with the merger of HBC and the North West Company, the British Parliament imposed the laws of Upper Canada on British subjects in Rupert’s Land and the Columbia District, and gave the authority to enforce those laws to the newly reconfigured Hudson's Bay Company. McLoughlin, as Superintendent of Fort Vancouver, applied the law to British subjects, kept peace with the natives and sought to maintain law and order over American settlers as well.

In August 1828, McLoughlin was in charge at Fort Vancouver when American explorer Jedediah Smith, John Turner, Arthur Black, and Richard Leland arrived, the only survivors of the massacre of fifteen members of his exploring party by Umpqua people, who lived to the south in Oregon. McLoughlin sent a party headed by Alexander Roderick McLeod to recover Smith's property.

In the early 1840s, with the arrival of the first wagon trains via the Oregon Trail, McLoughlin disobeyed company orders and extended substantial aid to the American settlers. Relations between Britain and the United States had become very strained, and many expected war to break out any time. McLoughlin's aid probably prevented an armed attack on his outpost by the numerous American settlers. The settlers understood that his motives were not purely altruistic, and some resented the assistance, working against him for the rest of his life.

=== Pressure over the Pacific Northwest ===
As tensions mounted in the Oregon boundary dispute; Simpson, realizing that border might ultimately be as far north as the 49th parallel, ordered McLoughlin to relocate their regional headquarters to Vancouver Island. McLoughlin, in turn, directed James Douglas to construct Fort Camosun (now Victoria, British Columbia, Canada) in 1843. But McLoughlin, whose life was increasingly connected to the Willamette River Valley, refused to move there.

McLoughlin was involved with the debate over the future of the Oregon Country. He advocated an independent nation that would be free of the United States during debates at the Oregon Lyceum in 1842 through his lawyer. This view won support at first and a resolution adopted but was later moved away from in favor of a resolution by George Abernethy of the Methodist Mission to wait on forming an independent country.

In 1843, American settlers established their own government, called the Provisional Government of Oregon. A legislative committee drafted a code of laws known as the Organic Law. It included the creation of an executive committee of three, a judiciary, militia, land laws, and four counties. There was vagueness and confusion over the nature of the 1843 Organic Law, in particular, whether it was constitutional or statutory. In 1844, a new legislative committee decided to consider it statutory. The 1845 Organic Law made additional changes, including allowing the participation of British subjects in the government. Although the Oregon Treaty of 1846 settled the boundaries of US jurisdiction upon all lands south of the 49th parallel, the Provisional Government continued to function until 1849, when the first governor of Oregon Territory arrived.

== Personal life ==
McLoughlin's first child, Joseph, was born in 1809. The name of Joseph's mother is unknown, but it is likely that she was Ojibwe. Around 1810, McLoughlin entered into a relationship with Marguerite Waddens McKay. McKay was the daughter of Jean-Étienne Waddens, who was one of the original partners of the North West Company, and an indigenous woman whose name is unknown. She was the widow of Alexander McKay, a trader killed in the Tonquin incident. Her son Thomas became McLoughlin's stepson. McLoughlin and McKay had four children: John Jr., Elisabeth, Eloisa, and David. They were legally married in 1842 at Fort Vancouver.

McLoughlin's appearance, 6 foot 4 inches (193 cm) tall with long, prematurely white hair, brought him respect; but he was also generally known for his fair treatment of the people with whom he dealt, whether they were British subjects, U.S. citizens, or of indigenous origin (notwithstanding for example, his asymmetric use of force against the S'Klallam tribe after an earlier raid—an HBC ship under his command fired its cannons into an unrelated village near Port Townsend in the early morning, killing twenty-seven people and leveling the village.) . At the time, the wives of many Hudson's Bay field employees were indigenous, including McLoughlin's own wife.

John McLoughlin lost one son to a violent death. John McLoughlin, Jr. had been appointed the second Clerk in Charge at Fort Stikine, only to die in April 1842 at the hands of one of the fort employees, Urbain Heroux, who was charged with his murder but acquitted for lack of evidence, which added to the grievances John Sr. held against the company.

== Later life in the Oregon Territory ==
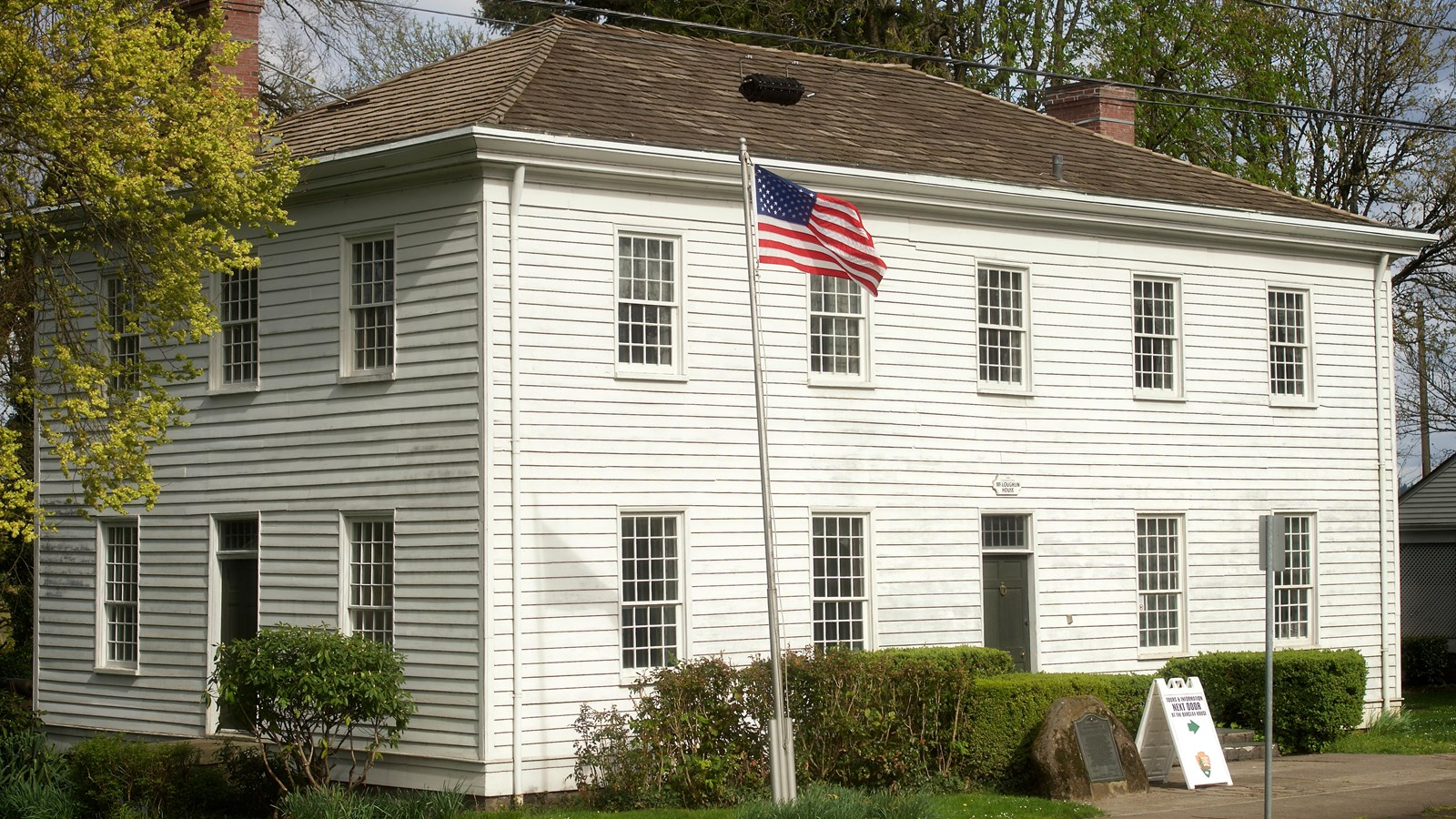
The McLoughlin House in Oregon City

After resigning from the Hudson's Bay Company in 1846, McLoughlin moved his family south to Oregon City in the Willamette Valley. The Oregon Treaty had been ratified by that time, and the region, now known as the Oregon Territory, was part of the United States. The valley was the destination of choice for settlers streaming in over the Oregon Trail. At his Oregon City store, he sold food and farming tools to settlers.

In 1847, McLoughlin was given the Knighthood of St. Gregory, bestowed on him by Pope Gregory XVI, and was made a Knight Commander. He became a U.S. citizen in 1849. McLoughlin's opponents succeeded in inserting a clause forfeiting his land claim in the Donation Land Claim Act of 1850 by Samuel R. Thurston. Although it was never enforced, it embittered the elderly McLoughlin. He served as mayor of Oregon City in 1851, winning 44 of 66 votes. He died of natural causes in 1857. His grave is now located beside his home overlooking downtown Oregon City.

== Legacy ==
McLoughlin is featured on the 1925 Fort Vancouver Centennial half dollar designed by Laura Gardin Fraser.

In 1953, the state of Oregon donated to the National Statuary Hall Collection a bronze statue of McLoughlin, which is currently displayed at the Capitol Visitor Center. The title "Father of Oregon" was officially bestowed on him by the Oregon Legislative Assembly in 1957, on the centennial of his death. Many landmarks in Oregon are named after him, including:

- Mount McLoughlin
- The John McLoughlin Bridge
- McLoughlin Boulevard, the street name of Oregon Route 99E between Oregon City and Portland
- Numerous schools

McLoughlin's former residence in Oregon City, now known as the McLoughlin House, is today a museum; it is part of the Fort Vancouver National Historic Site.

== See also ==
- John McLoughlin by Alexander Phimister Proctor
- James Douglas
- Jason Lee
- Marcus Whitman
- Narcissa Whitman
- Willamette Cattle Company

== Bibliography ==
- Galbraith, John S. (September 1954). "The Early History of the Puget's Sound Agricultural Company, 1838-43". Oregon Historical Quarterly. 55 (3). Oregon Historical Society: 234–259. JSTOR 20612147.
- Lamb, W. Kaye (1985). "McLoughlin, John". In Halpenny, Francess G. (ed.). Dictionary of Canadian Biography. Vol. VIII (1851–1860) (online ed.). University of Toronto Press.
- Simpson, George (1847), An Overland Journey Round the World, during the Years 1841 and 1842., Philadelphia: Lea and Blanchard
