= Fort Durham =

Archaeological site in Alaska, United States

- Fort Durham Site
- U.S. National Register of Historic Places
- U.S. National Historic Landmark
- Alaska Heritage Resources Survey
- Location within Alaska
- Location: Address restricted, Juneau City and Borough, Alaska, U.S.
- Nearest city: Juneau, Alaska
- Built: 1840
- Architect: James Douglas
- NRHP reference No.: 78000529
- AHRS No.: JUN-036

Significant dates
- Added to NRHP: May 5, 1978
- Designated NHL: June 2, 1978

Fort Durham, also known as Fort Taku, Taku, Taco, and Tacouw, is an archaeological site near Taku Harbor, Alaska, within the limits of Juneau City and Borough and Tongass National Forest. It was one of three Hudson's Bay Company (HBC) posts set up in Russian America. The Fort Durham Site was declared a U.S. National Historic Landmark in 1978.

== Background ==
In 1834 the HBC tried to establish a post on the Stikine River, British rights to which had been one of the terms of the Russo-British Treaty of 1825. However, the effort was blocked by employees of the Russian American Company (RAC), on the orders of Governor Ferdinand von Wrangel. Several years were spent by the HBC attempting to seek financial compensation from the RAC in response to be being blocked access from the Stikine River. Late in 1838 the Imperial Russian Government ordered the RAC to settle their dispute with HBC, eventually leading to the signing of the RAC-HBC Agreement in early 1839. One of the main terms was a ten-year lease of what is today the Alaska Panhandle. The HBC was guaranteed the right to establish posts, hunt, and trade furs along the coast in exchange for furnishing Russian America with provisions and various food supplies.

== Creation ==
Taking advantage of the agreement's terms immediately, the HBC sent James Douglas north in the Beaver in 1840. Douglas explored the Taku River and built Fort Durham (or Taku) on the coast just south of the river's mouth. He also took possession of Redoubt San Dionisio (Fort Saint Dionysius), which lay off the mouth of the Stikine River on Etolin Island, near today's Wrangell, Alaska (and renamed it Fort Stikine), which the Russians had agreed to transfer to the HBC under the 1839 lease agreement.

== Closure ==
In 1841 the HBC governor George Simpson ordered Fort Durham and other coastal posts closed, because the Beaver was able to conduct the coastal fur trade without the need for more than the single permanent post of Fort Simpson. The HBC closed operations at Fort Durham in 1843. The majority of the 8 Hawaiian Kanakas employees at Fort Durham were reassigned to Fort Victoria.

== See also ==
- Maritime Fur Trade
- List of National Historic Landmarks in Alaska
- National Register of Historic Places listings in Juneau, Alaska
