= Knowledge Totem Pole =

Totem pole in Victoria, British Columbia

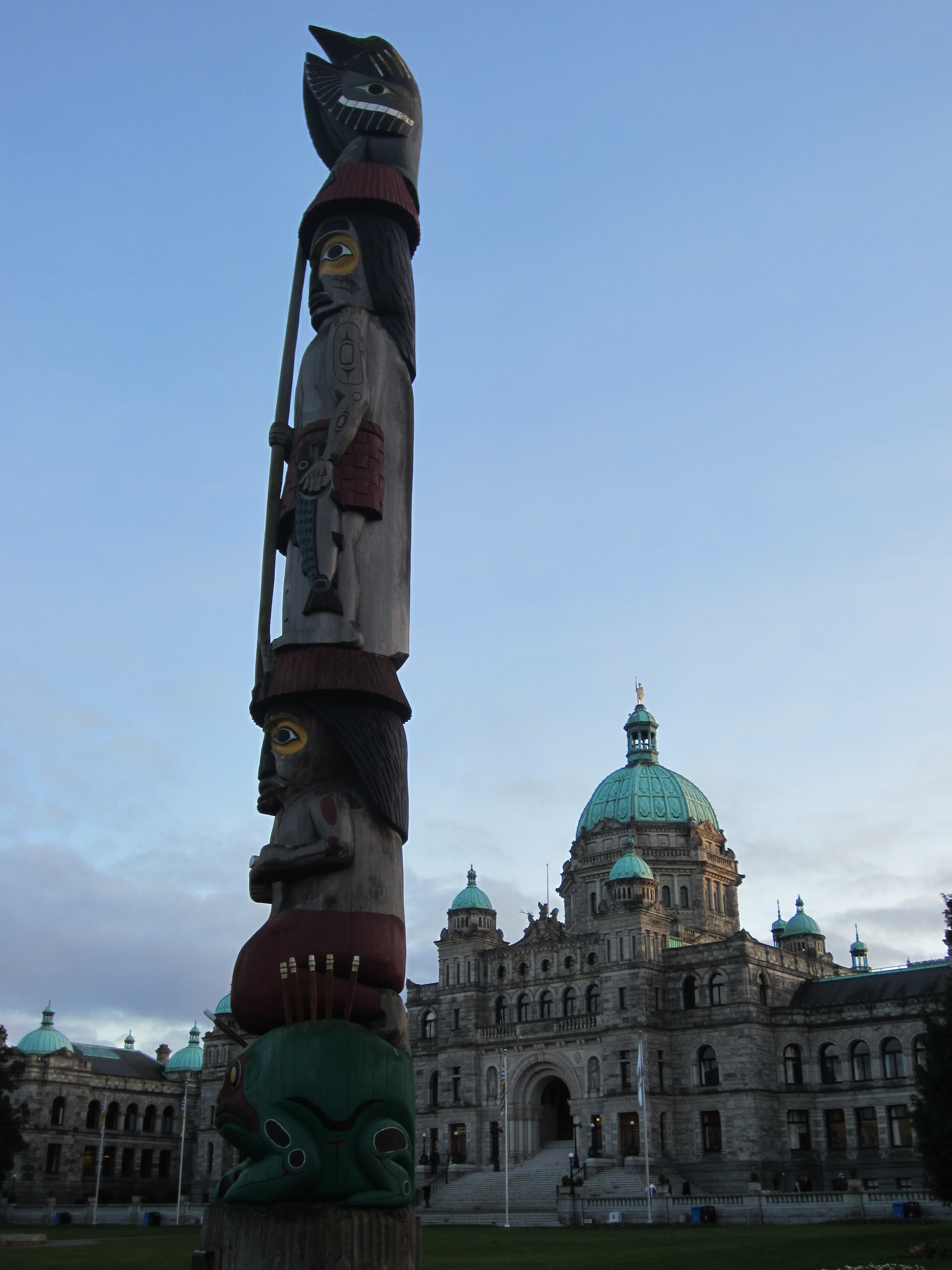
- The totem pole in 2012
- Artist: Cicero August
- Location: Victoria, British Columbia, Canada
- Coordinates: 48°25′14″N 123°22′14″W

The Knowledge Totem Pole is a totem pole carved by Coast Salish artist Cicero August and sons Darrel and Doug August, installed outside the British Columbia Parliament Buildings, in Victoria, British Columbia. The pole was originally created for the 1994 Commonwealth Games.

The Knowledge Totem Pole was first restored in 2007 by Doug August Sr. (Hul'qumi'num: Sume'lh). It was refurbished again in 2021 under the supervision of Doug August Jr.

The totem pole consists of (from top to bottom) a loon, a fisher, the bone player, and a frog. The top figure, the loon, represents "the teacher of the speakers" as well as an interpreter of all the Indigenous languages spoken. The fisher represents the traditional way of life of coastal Indigenous peoples. Below the fisher is the bone player, who represents a non-verbal game that can be played by people who do not share the same language. The bottom figure, the frog, is from an old mountain story and also symbolizes a tear.
