= William Connolly (fur trader) =

Canadian fur trader

William Connolly (1786-1848) was an Anglo-Canadian fur trader who oversaw activities in New Caledonia, now located within modern-day British Columbia.

== Early life ==
William Connolly was born in approximately 1786 in Lachine, Quebec. Though his family had Irish roots, they were fully established in French Canadian society by the time of his birth and were distantly related to Marguerite d'Youville.

== Career ==
Connolly joined the North West Company (NWC) in 1801 as an apprentice clerk. Two years later, he married, according to the local custom, a Métis Cree girl Miyo Nipiy (also known as Susanna Pas de Nom), step-daughter of an influential chief. Later, the couple had their first child, John Connolly, probably near Southern Indian Lake, as he was stationed at Nelson House, Manitoba between 1802 and 1803 he was at Nelson House (Man.) and did not move to the Rat River House until 1804. Over the course of their marriage, the couple were to have six children together, including a daughter, Amelia born in 1812, who would become the 1st first lady of British Columbia.

Connolly gradually ascended the corporate hierarchy of the NWC and later the Hudson's Bay Company (HBC). When the NWC absorbed into the HBC in 1821, Connolly went west to New Caledonia to reexamine all regional operations in 1821. He was appointed Chief Factor in 1825 and held managerial responsibilities from Fort St. James until 1831, when Peter Warren Dease took over. While at Fort St. James he took James Douglas under his wing, impressed by Douglas' skills. Because of their close relations, Connolly agreed to Douglas marrying his daughter Amelia and performed their customary ceremony at the fort.

In 1832 Connolly took his family back to Montreal, but disavowed his marriage to Susanna as being non-legally binding. On 16 May 1832, he married Julia Woolrich, his second cousin in a Catholic ceremony. Though he had repudiated his first family, he continued to support them, even after they left Montreal and moved to Saint Boniface, Manitoba, where Susanna lived in the Grey Nuns' convent. Soon after the marriage to Julia, the HBC placed him in charge of the king's posts they rented in Lower Canada and he and his new wife moved to Tadoussac. His territory increased over time and within six years included Mingan, Quebec, but Julia, by then the mother of two children, longed to return to Montreal. Connolly asked for leave and the company, hoping to push him into retirement offered a post at Fort Albany on James Bay, which they felt certain Julia would reject as unsuitable. In 1843, Connolly accepted retirement and returned to Montreal, where he lived lavishly until his death, on 3 June 1848 in Montreal.

== Legacy ==
After his death, in 1862, Connelly's oldest son John, sued Julia Woolrich Connolly, who had inherited his father's estate. He argued that he and his siblings were legitimate heirs and entitled to inherit. He won his case and the verdict was upheld by the appellate courts. When Julia's heirs appealed to the Privy Council of the United Kingdom, the parties finally reached an out-of-court settlement. The judgment was important, as it validated the concept of common law marriage in Canada and upheld the right of children to inherit, but it also indicated that the laws and customs of First Nations people were valid and serve as an underpinning to Canadian law.

== Bibliography ==
- Adams, John; Adams, John David (2011). Old Square-Toes and His Lady: The Life of James and Amelia Douglas. Victoria, B.C., Canada: TouchWood Editions. ISBN 978-1-926971-71-1.
- Borrows, John J.; Rotman, Leonard I. (1998). "Report of the Royal Commission on Aboriginal Peoples, Restructuring the Relationship, Vol. 2". Aboriginal Legal Issues: Cases, Materials & Commentary. Toronto, Ontario, Canada: Butterworths. pp. 684–688. ISBN 0-433-40964-9.
- Peel, Bruce (2003). "Connolly, Suzanne". Dictionary of Canadian Biography. University of Toronto, Toronto, Ontario, Canada: Dictionary of Canadian Biography, vol. 9. Archived from the original on 20 July 2017.
- Peel, Bruce (2003). "Connolly, William". Dictionary of Canadian Biography. University of Toronto, Toronto, Ontario, Canada: Dictionary of Canadian Biography, vol. 7.
- Watson, Bruce M. (2010), Lives Lived West of the Divide: A Biographical Dictionary of Fur Traders Working West of the Rockies, 1793-1858, Okanagan: The Centre for Social, Spatial and Economic Justice of the University of British Columbia
