= BC150 =

BC150 is the name given by the government of the Province of British Columbia, Canada, to a programme of events and celebrations that were held in 2008. The motive for the commemoration, as cited by the provincial government, is the founding of the British Crown Colony of British Columbia 150 years earlier, in 1858.

A government hosted website — www.BC150.ca — was launched on January 31, 2008, but discontinued about April 2009.

== Event commemorated ==
The colony founded in 1858 consisted of the Hudson's Bay Company's territory of New Caledonia, which covered most of the mainland of today's province of British Columbia.

That mainland colony was one of three precursors to the present-day province of British Columbia, and the province's roots as a British colony date back to the founding of the Crown Colony of Vancouver Island in 1849. The mainland colony as established in 1858 existed only until 1866, when it was amalgamated with the older Vancouver Island colony, with Victoria designated to be the capital of the merged colony, much to the chagrin of New Westminster, which had been the mainland's capital. The "new" Colony of British Columbia thereby created entered the Canadian confederation in 1871 as the Province of British Columbia. Thus, today's province of British Columbia was assembled, with its present boundaries and with its capital at Victoria, out of three separate British colonies: the Crown Colony of Vancouver Island, established in 1849 and having its capital at Victoria; the Colony of the Queen Charlotte Islands, established in 1853 and administered by the Governor of the Crown Colony of Vancouver Island; and the Crown Colony of British Columbia, established in 1858 and having its capital at New Westminster.

The three colonies were intertwined from their beginnings, as it was the Governor of the Crown Colony of Vancouver Island, Sir James Douglas, who urged Britain to create the mainland colony in 1858 and was then named its first governor who unilaterally declared the mainland colony to prevent American takeover, forcing London's hand in formalizing British possession of the mainland. From the creation of the mainland colony in 1858 until his retirement in 1864, he administered both from Victoria. He also served as sole administrator of the Colony of the Queen Charlotte Islands during its entire existence, from 1853 to 1863, when it was annexed to the Crown Colony of British Columbia.

== See also ==
- List of governors of Vancouver Island and British Columbia
