= Douglas Obelisk =

Obelisk in Victoria, British Columbia, Canada

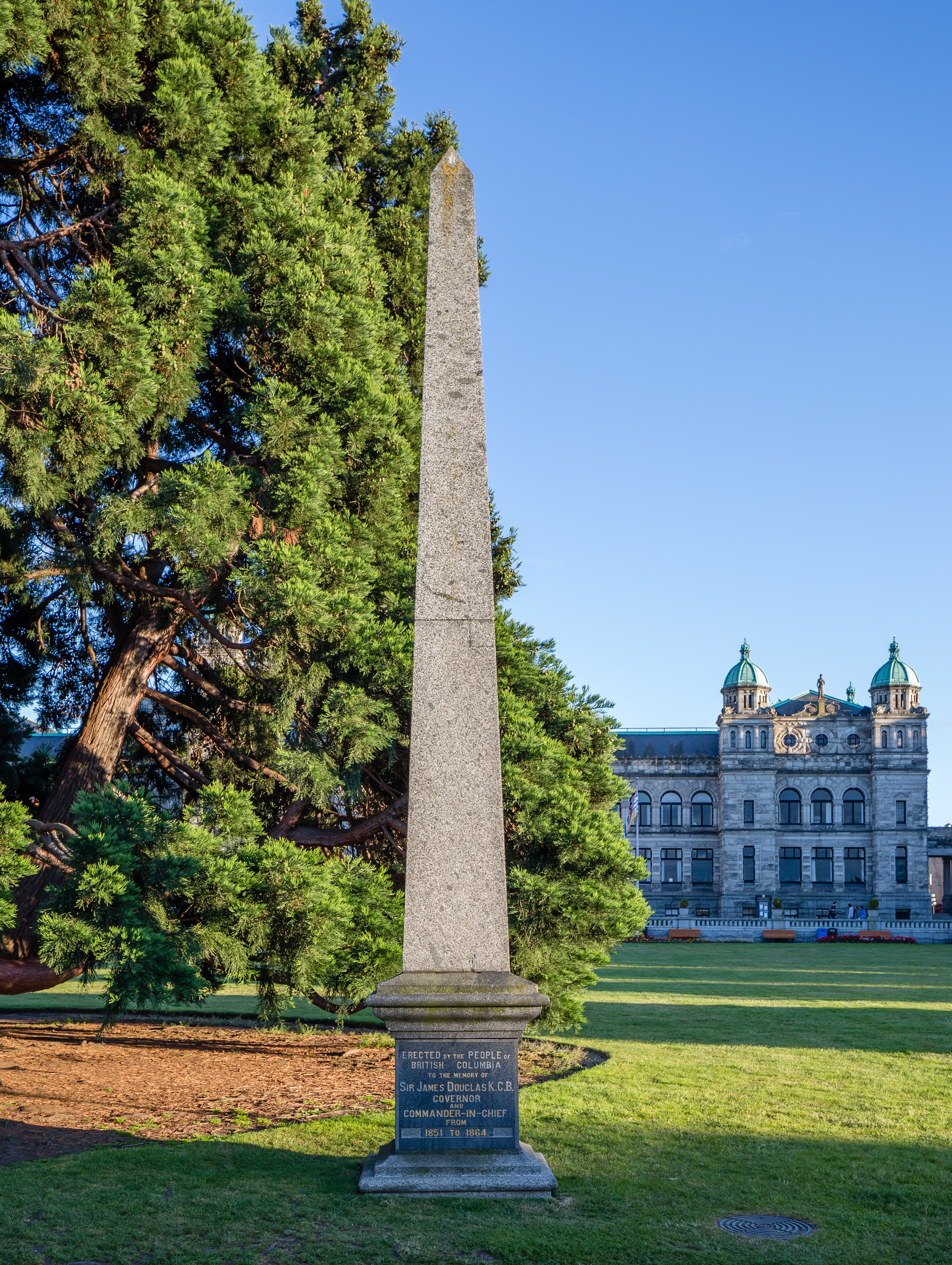
- Medium: Marble sculpture
- Dimensions: 8 m (26 ft)
- Location: Victoria, British Columbia, Canada
- Coordinates: 48.420508°N 123.369946°W

Douglas Obelisk is an 8-metre (27 ft) marble obelisk, installed outside the British Columbia Parliament Buildings in Victoria, British Columbia, Canada. The sculpture was erected in 1881 to honour Sir James Douglas, the first governor of the Colony of British Columbia, and was made by Mortimer & Reid using marble from Beaver Cove, Vancouver Island.
