= John McLoughlin Jr. =

- Born: August 18, 1812; Fort William, Upper Canada
- Died: April 21, 1842 (aged 29); Fort Stikine (now in Alaska)
- Cause of death: Gunshot wound
- Burial place: Fort Vancouver
- Employer: Hudson's Bay Company
- Known for: Fur trader
- Father: John McLoughlin

John McLoughlin Jr. (1812–1842) was a Metis chief trader employed by the Hudson's Bay Company. While stationed as chief trader at Fort Stikine, he was shot and killed by his own men.

== Early life ==
John McLoughlin was born on 18 August 1812, possibly at Fort William, to Dr. John McLoughlin, a Quebec-born physician working for the North West Company, and Marguerite Wadin, a Métis woman.

When John was eight, his father sent him to Montreal, where he would be kept in the care of his great-uncle, Dr. Simon Fraser. His uncle had been tasked with ensuring that John received an education, though behavioural issues resulted in his expulsion from several institutions, and he ultimately failed to received the education his father sought for him.

Having run out of options in Montreal, John sailed to Paris in October 1829, where he would be placed under the care of another uncle, Dr. David McLoughlin. He spent four years in Paris, studying anatomy and medicine, before he was abruptly banished by his uncle after an outburst, returning to Montreal in 1833

Within two years back in Montreal, he was destitute, and forced to follow in his father's career, which by this time was with the Hudson's Bay Company.

== Fort Stikine ==
He was appointed to Fort Stikine though was unpopular with some of the Metis among the staff.

=== Murder ===
Several staff members killed him on 21 April 1842, in what they alleged was self-defense at his drunken rage. Hawaiian Kanaka employees who witnessed the killing were to testify otherwise. They alleged that the rebel staff, led by one Urbain Héroux, had conspired with the local Tlingits to seize the post.

The usual laws governing the Company and its staff were those of the Colony of Canada. However, because the murder had happened on ostensibly Russian soil, these laws did not apply in this case. George Simpson arrived five days after the murder and held a short investigation. He found the murder "justifiable homicide", and took Heroux and the others to the Russian American capital of Novoarkhangelsk for trial. While still at Novoarkhangelsk Simpson was surprised to encounter Heroux at liberty on the streets. Unlike British colonial law, the accused were free until convicted under Russian law. They were ultimately not prosecuted by Governor of Russian Colonies in America Ferdinand von Wrangel and released by the spring of 1844 for lack of evidence.

The official handling of John Jr.'s death was a major factor in embittering his father against Simpson and the HBC:

"But the hastiness of the Sitka investigation, Simspon's unqualified condemnation of Fort Stikine as a "sink of corruption:, and his refusal to punish the son's murderers as McLoughlin demanded, or even send them to Canada for trial were facts which the father never forgave."

== Legacy ==
His body was interred at Fort Vancouver on 12 October 1843.

Author Debra Komar wrote an investigative history into the death of McLoughlin Jr. named The Bastard of Fort Stikine (Goose Lane Editions 2015). In it, Komar uses both forensic science and historical research to create a narrative of both Fort Stikine and the Canadian North.

== Bibliography ==
- Komar, Debra (2015). The Bastard of Fort Stikine: The Hudson's Bay Company and the Murder of John McLoughlin Jr. Fredericton, New Brunswick: Goose Lane Editions. ISBN 9780864928719.
- McLoughlin, John (1915), "Dr. John McLoughlin's Last Letter to the Hudson's Bay Company, as Chief Factor, in charge at Fort Vancouver, 1845", The American Historical Review, 21 (1), Oxford University Press: 104–134, doi:10.2307/1836705, JSTOR 1836705
- Watson, Bruce McIntyre (2010), Lives Lived West of the Divide: A Biographical Dictionary of Fur Traders Working West of the Rockies, 1793-1858, Kelowna, B.C.: The Centre for Social, Spatial and Economic Justice: The University of British Columbia, Okanagan
