= Alexander Grant Dallas =

Canadian politician

- Born: 25 July 1816
- Died: 3 January 1882 (aged 65)

Alexander Grant Dallas (25 July 1816 – 3 January 1882) was a Chief Factor in the Hudson's Bay Company and superintendent of the Columbia District and New Caledonia from 1857 to 1861, then superintendent of Fort Garry in what was to become Manitoba from 1862 to 1864. He was later the Governor of Rupert's Land. He married Jane Douglas on 9 March 1858. She was a daughter of James Douglas, Governor of the Colony of Vancouver Island.

== Legacy and honors ==
He is the namesake of Dallas Bank in Esquimalt Harbour, Dallas Mountain on San Juan Island, and Dallas Road in Victoria, British Columbia.

| Preceded by James Douglas | Chief Factor of Hudson's Bay Company; 1858–1861 | Succeeded by ??? |
| Preceded by George Simpson | Governor of Rupert's Land; 3 February 1862 – 1864 | Succeeded by ??? |
