= James Douglas (governor) =

Governor of the Colony of British Columbia (1803–1877)

Sir James Douglas KCB
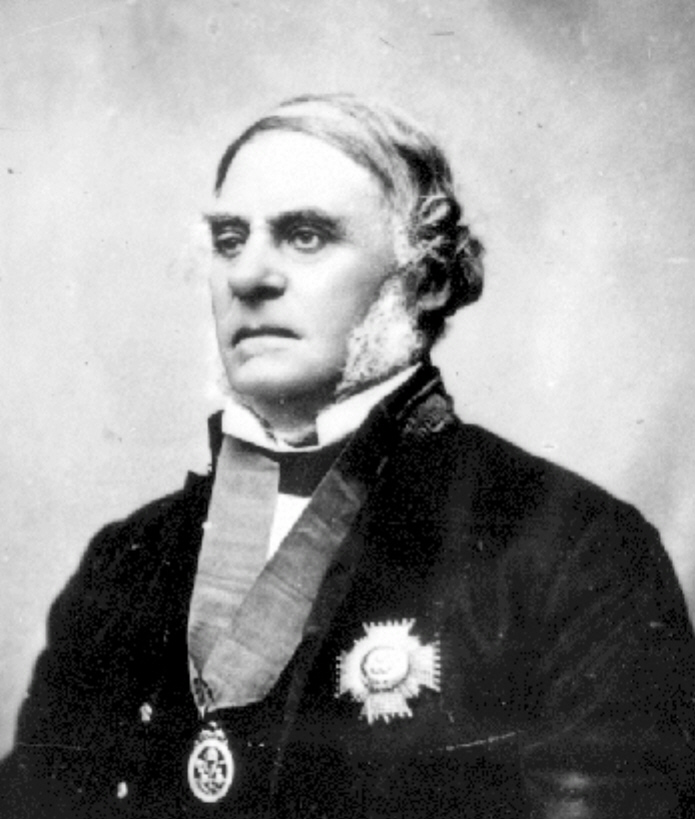
- James Douglas, wearing the insignia of the Order of the Bath

1st Governor of British Columbia
- In office 1858–1864
- Succeeded by: Frederick Seymour

2nd Governor of Vancouver Island
- In office 1851–1864
- Preceded by: Richard Blanshard
- Succeeded by: Arthur Edward Kennedy

Personal details
- Born: August 15, 1803 Demerara, Dutch/Batavian Colony of Essequibo
- Died: August 2, 1877 (aged 73) Victoria, British Columbia
- Resting place: Ross Bay Cemetery
- Party: None
- Spouse: Amelia Douglas (m. 1828)
- Children: 13 (6 lived to adulthood), including James W. Douglas
- Parents: John Douglas (father); Martha Ann (mother)

Sir James Douglas, KCB (August 15, 1803 – August 2, 1877) was a Canadian fur trader and politician who became the first governor of the Colony of British Columbia.

Douglas was the son of a wealthy Scottish planter and a free coloured woman of Creole ancestry. He worked for the Hudson's Bay Company, of which he became Chief Factor.

From 1851 to 1864, he was Governor of the Colony of Vancouver Island, as which his authority nominally extended to the mainland Colony of British Columbia, during its Fraser Canyon Gold Rush.

As a consequence of his indifference to the development of the mainland colony, in preference for the increase of the power of his Hudson's Bay Company associates in Victoria, Douglas feuded with the mainland colony's popular founder and Lieutenant-Governor Richard Clement Moody, whose office was of higher prestige but lesser authority than his own.

Robert Burnaby observed that Douglas proceeded with "muddling [Moody's] work and doubling his expenditure" and with employing administrators to "work a crooked policy against Moody" to "retard British Columbia and build up ... the stronghold of Hudson's Bay interests" and the latter's "landed stake". John Robson, who was the editor of the British Columbian and future Premier of British Columbia, wanted Moody's office to include that of Governor, to make Douglas obsolete.

== Early life ==
=== Family ===
Douglas was born on 15 August 1803 in Essequibo, on the northeast coast of South America, which was then a colony of the Batavian Republic. His father was John Douglas Junior, a Scottish owner of West Indian plantations and merchant from Glasgow. His first cousins included Lieutenant-General Sir Neil Douglas, Commander-in-Chief, Scotland, and the same's sister Cecilia Douglas, who inherited two slave plantations by marriage and was an art collector. Through his paternal grandmother, James Douglas was related to the diplomat Sir Andrew Buchanan, 1st Baronet.

His mother was Martha Ann (née Ritchie, later Telfer). Ritchie, who was classified as free coloured, was of Creole ethnicity. She and Douglas's father had three children together (Alexander, born 1801 or 1802; James, born 1803; and Cecilia, born 1812), but never formally married.

=== Early life ===
In 1812, John Douglas returned, from the West Indies, to Scotland with his children and put James into school at Lanark to be educated. John married Jessie Hamilton in 1819, and had more children with her, making a second family. James went to school or was taught by a French Huguenot in Manchester, England, where he learned to speak and write in fluent French, which helped him in North America.

=== North West Company ===
At the age of 16, James Douglas signed on to join the North West Company (NWC), a major organization active in the North American fur trade. He sailed from Liverpool for Lachine, Lower Canada, in spring 1819. From there, Douglas was assigned as a clerk at Fort William in what is now Thunder Bay.

The following year, he was moved to Île-à-la-Crosse on the Churchill River in what is now northern Saskatchewan. The rival Hudson's Bay Company was also active in this area, and Douglas was caught up in at least one argument with the fighting fur traders. Douglas continued his policy of self-education by reading books brought from Britain and meeting with many First Nations people.

== Hudson's Bay Company ==
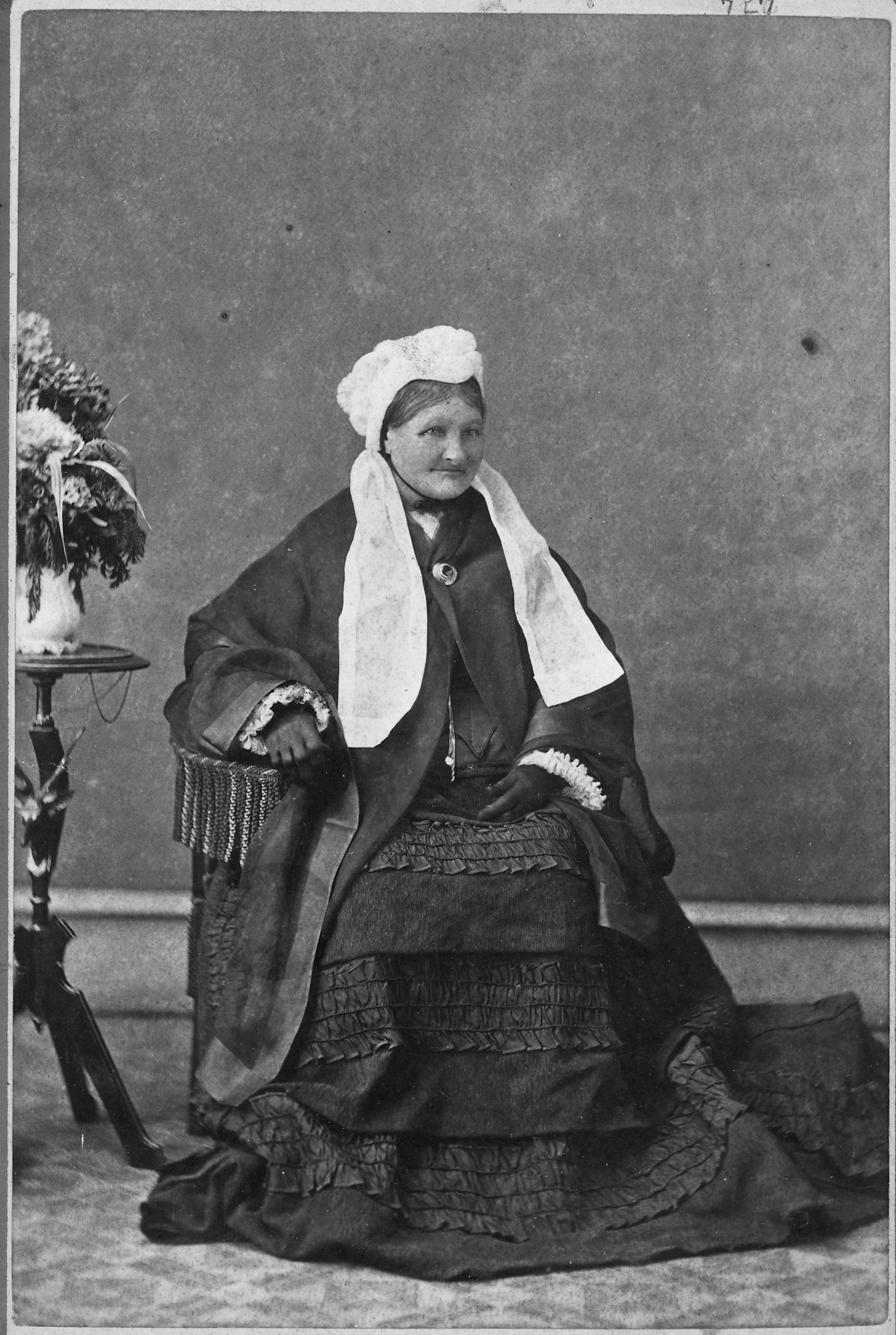
Lady Amelia Connolly Douglas, his wife

In 1821, the NWC was merged into its powerful competitor, the Hudson's Bay Company (HBC). Douglas's contract was placed onto the HBC's payroll. He quickly moved up the strict HBC hierarchy. In 1825, he was put in charge of the founding of the Fort Vermilion trading post in what is now northern Alberta. He was next assigned at Fort St. James on Stuart Lake, headquarters of the company's New Caledonia District, roughly located within modern British Columbia.

In 1827, he established Fort Connolly on Bear Lake. The station was named after his manager, William Connolly, who was impressed by Douglas's skills and viewed him favourably. Because of their close relations, Connolly agreed to Douglas marrying his Métis daughter Amelia Connolly. Her mother was Cree and likely also Métis. Douglas and Amelia were married on 27 April 1828 'à la façon du pays', a ceremony repeated almost a decade later at Fort Vancouver.

Throughout part of 1828, Connolly was absent from Fort St. James, leaving Douglas in charge. Two company traders were murdered with the help of a Dakelh. Douglas was said to have marched into the Stuart Lake village and seized the accused murderer, but the exact events of the day are disputed. By some accounts, Douglas shot the native in the head on the spot, with everyone watching. In others, Douglas took him away from the village, to be executed later. Another story is that Douglas tried to shoot the man but missed and got his partners to beat the accused before taking him away. Various accounts were passed around the area, and Douglas generally acquired a negative reputation among the local First Nations as a result.

Fearing for Douglas's life, Connolly asked HBC Governor George Simpson to transfer the younger man elsewhere. He was reassigned to Fort Vancouver, headquarters of the company's Columbia District, near the mouth of the Columbia River in present-day Washington. His wife joined him after the death of their first child in 1830. While they lived in Fort Vancouver, she gave birth to ten more children (five died in infancy). Their son James W. Douglas grew up to become a politician and Member of the Legislative Assembly (MLA), 1875–1878.

=== Fort Vancouver ===
Douglas spent 19 years working in Fort Vancouver. He served as a Clerk until 1835, when he was promoted to Chief Trader, the second highest rank in the HBC. Being a Chief Trader was a very important position that was held by only four others in the large district. He received his commission as one of "the gentlemen of the interior" on June 3, 1835, in York Factory during a meeting of the Council of the Northern Department. In 1838, Douglas was put in charge of the Columbia District while Chief Factor John McLoughlin was on furlough in Europe. While he commanded Fort Vancouver, he denounced the enslavement of Chinookan peoples.

=== Pugets Sound Agricultural Company ===
Douglas supported Simpson's plans of making a settlement with the Russian-American Company (RAC). In Hamburg in early 1839, Simpson and Governor of Russian Colonies in America Ferdinand von Wrangel negotiated a commercial treaty that established future relations between the two state companies.

The RAC-HBC Agreement let the HBC rent a portion of Russian American claimed territory referred to as the "Stikine lisière." The area leased by the RAC was on the Alaskan Panhandle, on the northern coast from Mount Fairweather south to 54°40′. In return, the RAC received 2000 otter pelts and a number of other goods, notably a large supply of wheat and provisions needed at various Russian stations. To meet the demand, Simpson and members of the governing committee created the Pugets Sound Agricultural Company (PSAC) to both meet this demand and promote settlement of territories around Cowlitz Farm and Fort Nisqually. Both stations are now located within modern Washington.

=== Later years at Fort Vancouver ===
In November 1839, Douglas was promoted to Chief Factor, the highest possible rank for field service with the HBC. As a Chief Factor, he traveled to Alta California, where he met with a Mexican administrator and received permission to create a trading post in Yerba Buena, California (modern San Francisco). In 1841, Douglas was charged with the duty of setting up a trading post on the southern tip of Vancouver Island. George Simpson had recommended a second line of forts be built in case the Columbia River valley fell into American hands. Charged with the task, Douglas founded Fort Victoria, on the site of present-day Victoria, British Columbia. That proved beneficial when in 1846 the Oregon Treaty was signed, extending the British North America and the United States border along the 49th parallel from the Rocky Mountains to the Strait of Georgia.

== Fort Victoria ==
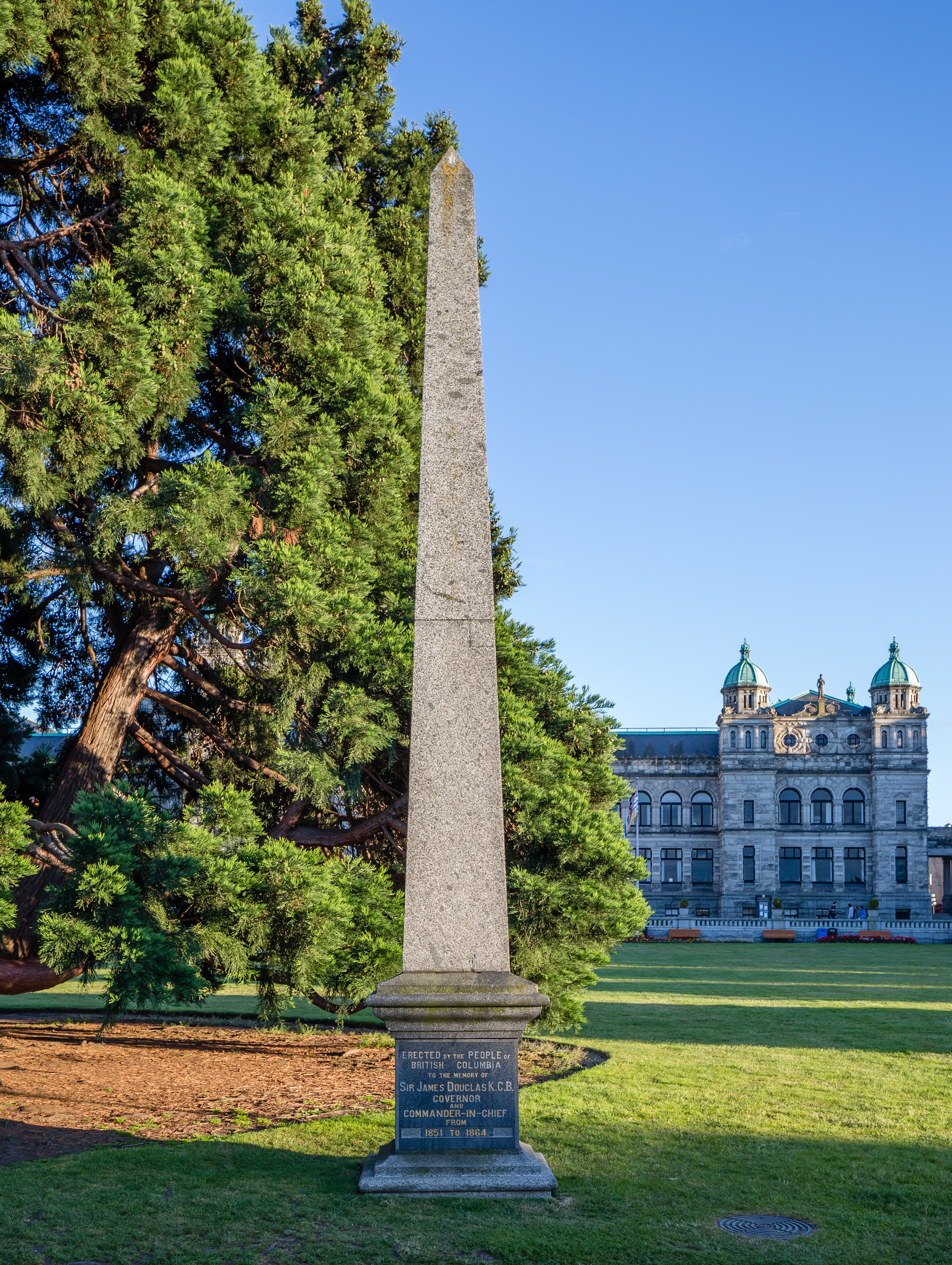
The Douglas Obelisk

In 1849, Britain leased the entirety of Vancouver Island to the HBC under the condition that a colony be created. Douglas moved the headquarters of the western portion of the company from Fort Vancouver to Fort Victoria.

Douglas had a Kanaka man accompany him in 1849 on his journey from Fort Vancouver to Victoria by canoe, and at Victoria, he had a Hawaiian cook and household servant.

He was not initially appointed as Governor of the Colony of Vancouver Island, which instead went to Richard Blanshard, an English barrister. However, most practical authorities rested with Douglas as the chief employer and person in charge of its finances and land, and he effectively drove Blanshard from the position. Douglas acknowledged the Royal Proclamation of 1763 and had the policy to trade the natives for their land.

Costs for each parcel of land were usually in the form of blankets, often three for each man. The policy also stemmed from a desire to have good interactions with natives while avoiding violence. After Blanshard resigned in 1851, the British government appointed Douglas as the Governor of Vancouver Island. As he was still Chief Factor of the HBC, he tried for several years to balance his important and time-consuming duties of both positions. He was the subject of controversy in local political debates and editorial tirades.

== Governor of the Colony of Vancouver Island ==
As governor, Douglas faced a number of significant challenges, not least of which was the expansionist pressure of the neighboring United States of America. Using his meagre resources, Douglas created the Victoria Voltigeurs, Vancouver Island's first militia, using money from the company and composed of Métis and French Canadians in the company's service. He created the Victoria Pioneer Rifle Corp, otherwise known as the African Rifles, an all-Black militia of immigrants from San Francisco's First African Methodist Episcopal Zion Church who settled on Vancouver Island in the 1860s at his invitation. He also used the sparse presence of the Royal Navy for protection. During the Crimean War, the British and French carried out an attack on Petropavlovsk in 1854, and casualties were sent to Victoria. After facilities of the key port proved inadequate, the British government charged Douglas to build a hospital at Esquimalt harbour, as well as improve Royal Navy supply capacity. This base proved to be important and successful when in 1865 the headquarters of the North Pacific Squadron were moved to Vancouver Island.

In 1859, Douglas also found his colony embroiled in a dispute with Washington Territory over sovereignty in the San Juan Islands. The protracted, twelve-year standoff came to be known as the Pig War. Douglas pressed Britain to exert sovereignty over all islands in the archipelago dividing the Strait of Georgia from Puget Sound. Named for the largest island of the group, the San Juan Islands are immediately adjacent to Victoria and so were of great strategic interest and worry. While opposing troops remained garrisoned on San Juan Island, the dispute was eventually settled by arbitration in favour of the United States.

Douglas's largest problem in the mid- and late 1850s concerned relations with the majority First Nations peoples. These numbered around 30,000 local Songhee, Cowichan, Nanaimo, Nuu-chah-nulth, including raiding Haida from Haida Gwaii and the Euclataws Kwakiutl of northern Georgia Strait and the Sechelt, Squamish, and Sto:lo peoples of the Lower Mainland. In contrast, Europeans in the Colony numbered under 1000. Meanwhile, in neighboring Oregon and Washington Territory the Cayuse and Yakima Wars and other conflicts between Americans and Indigenous peoples were raging.

His relations with First Nations peoples were mixed. On the one hand, Douglas's wife was Cree, he had established many close business and personal relationships with indigenous peoples as a fur trader, and he sought to conclude treaties (the Douglas Treaties) with First Nations on southern Vancouver Island. The Douglas Treaties included compensation to First Nations in return for their cession of large swaths of territory. The treaties, concluded between 1850 and 1854, acquired 14 parcels of land for the Crown from the native peoples, totaling 570 square kilometres (220 sq mi). The treaty-making was halted after the Colony ran out of money to pursue its expansion policy. Douglas directed surveyors to lay out British Columbia’s first reserves to include all occupied village sites and farm fields, “and as much land in the vicinity of each as they could till, or was required for their support.” Douglas further instructed that Indigenous people should be allowed to “freely exercise and enjoy the rights of fishing the Lakes and Rivers, and of hunting over all unoccupied Crown Lands in the Colony,” and should be permitted to “dig and search for gold, and hold mining claims on the same terms precisely as other miners.” On the other hand, in 1856, Douglas supplied Washington Territory's Governor Isaac Stevens with ammunition and other supplies to assist the US government in its conflict with Native American tribes. In correspondence between the two, Stevens requests, on credit, $10,000 to $15,000 of "Indian goods, for the distribution among the friendly Indians." The Hudson's Bay and other vendors would not accept Steven's promissory note for the goods requested, so Douglas purchased sugar, coffee, blankets, gunpowder and lead with his own personal funds.

He sponsored the resettlement of 35 Black Americans, later known as the "Pioneer Committee", from San Francisco to Vancouver Island.

The administration also founded public elementary schools, worked to control alcohol in the colony, and constructed the Victoria District Church (the forerunner to the Christ Church Cathedral). In 1856, as ordered by the British Government, Douglas reluctantly established an elected Legislative Assembly. That was a turning point for Douglas, who had grown accustomed to administering the colony with absolute authority. The council was opposed to Douglas on many issues and consistently criticized him for having a conflict of interest between his duties to the company and to the colony.

== Fraser Canyon Gold Rush ==
In 1856, gold was discovered in the Thompson River, a tributary of the Fraser River, and a year later in the Fraser River itself. That sparked an influx of miners and others, as word of the discoveries spread south to the United States. Thousands of Americans flooded into British Columbia during the Fraser Canyon Gold Rush. Although without political authority on the Mainland, Douglas worked to exert British jurisdiction over the territory. He stationed a warship at the mouth of the Fraser in order to issue licenses to prospectors and merchants. A major task during the huge inflow of settlers was to prevent violence between the recent arrivals and the local First Nations peoples. The Indian Wars in the United States West made American animosity against natives often high. In the fall of 1858, escalating tensions between the miners and the Nlaka’pamux people of the central area of the canyon broke into the Fraser Canyon War.

Douglas's actions in asserting British sovereignty over the Mainland is generally conceded today to have helped exert control over American miners and to undermine American territorial ambitions toward this part of British North America. Shortly thereafter, the Colonial Office formally confirmed Douglas's proclamation of sovereignty and established a new colony encompassing the Mainland.

== Feud with Moody ==
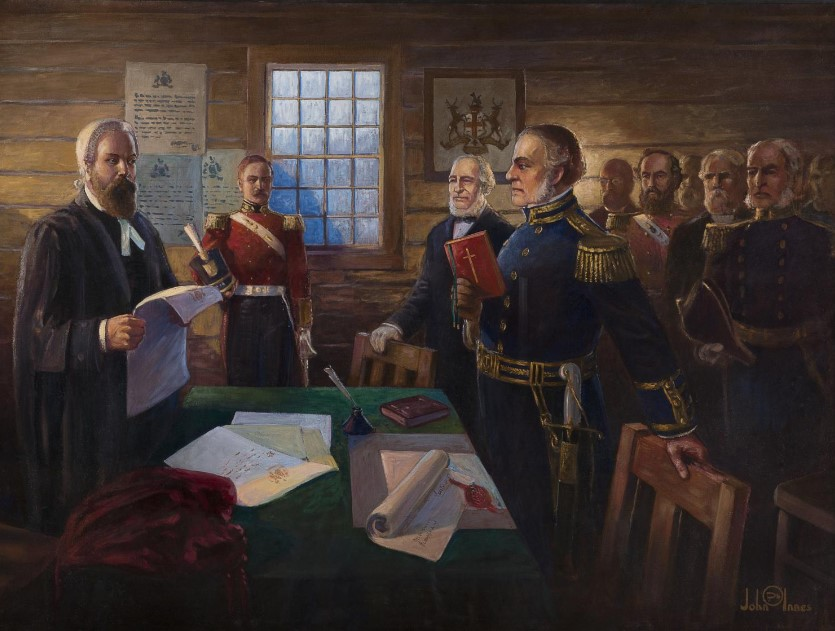
James Douglas Taking the Oath at Fort Langley as First Governor of BC, AD 1858 (1925, oil on canvas)

After the British Parliament in 1858 created the Crown Colony of British Columbia, Douglas was assigned as governor and was asked to resign as Chief Factor of the western portion of the Hudson's Bay Company. The Crown did not renew the company's trade monopoly on the mainland or Douglas's position as Chief Factor.

Richard Clement Moody was handpicked by the Colonial Office, under Sir Edward Bulwer-Lytton, to establish British order and to transform the newly established Colony of British Columbia into the British Empire's "bulwark in the farthest west" and "found a second England on the shores of the Pacific". Lytton desired to send to the colony "representatives of the best of British culture, not just a police force," sought men who possessed "courtesy, high breeding and urbane knowledge of the world," and decided to send Moody, whom the Government considered to be the archetypal English gentleman and British Officer" at the head of the Royal Engineers, Columbia Detachment.

Moody was sworn in, as the first lieutenant governor of British Columbia and Chief Commissioner of Lands and Works for British Columbia, at Victoria, on 4 January 1859. Throughout his tenure in British Columbia, Moody was feuded with Douglas, whose jurisdiction overlapped with his own. Moody's position as Chief Commissioner and Lieutenant-Governor was one of ‘higher prestige [and] lesser authority' than that of Douglas, despite Moody's superior social position in the judgement of the British settlers. Moody had been selected by Lord Lytton for his qualities of the archetypal 'English gentleman and British Officer', and because his family was 'eminently respectable': he was the son of Colonel Thomas Moody and of Martha Clement who was a socially superior member of the planter class of the West Indies, including Demerara and The Guianas, in which Douglas's father and the same's brothers owned less land and from which Douglas's 'a half-breed' mother originated. Governor Douglas's ethnicity was 'an affront to Victorian society'.

Mary Moody, who was a member of the Hawks industrialist dynasty and of the armigerous Boyd merchant banking family, wrote, on 4 August 1859 'it is not pleasant to serve under a Hudson's Bay Factor' and that the 'Governor and Richard can never get on'. Robert Burnaby observed that Douglas proceeded with "muddling [Moody's] work and doubling his expenditure" and with employing administrators to "work a crooked policy against Moody" to "retard British Columbia and build up ... the stronghold of Hudson's Bay interests" and their own "landed stake". John Robson, who was the editor of the British Columbian and future Premier of British Columbia, also supported Moody: he wanted Moody's office to include that of Governor of British Columbia, to make Douglas obsolete.In a letter to the Colonial Office of 27 December 1858, Moody boasted that he has ‘entirely disarmed [Douglas] of all jealously' Douglas repeatedly insulted the Engineers by attempting to assume their command, and refusing to acknowledge their value in the nascent colony.

Margaret A. Ormsby, author of the Dictionary of Canadian Biography entry for Moody (2002), condemns Moody for a contribution to the abortive development of the city. However, most other historians have exonerated Moody for the abortive development of the city and consider his achievement to be impressive, especially with regard to the perpetual insufficiency of funds and the personally-motivated opposition of Douglas, whose opposition to the project continually slowed its development. Robert Edgar Cail, Don W. Thomson, Laura Ishiguro, and Laura Elaine Scott have praised Moody for his contribution, the latter accusing Ormsby of being ‘adamant in her dislike of Colonel Moody’ despite the evidence, and almost all biographies of Moody, including those of the Institute of Civil Engineers, the Royal Engineers, and the British Columbia Historical Association, are flattering.

== Governor ==
In August 1858, news reached Douglas that two Vancouver Island miners had been killed by natives. He believed that the whole region was on the verge of war and went out to investigate. Numerous minor clashes between natives and whites had concluded without fatalities. After investigating the situation he found that alcohol had been a major cause, and prohibited the sale of liquor to natives. While on the trip to the murder scene, Douglas brought the Crown Solicitor of Vancouver Island to uphold the law and make a show that demonstrated British law was still in effect. During the trip, he encountered a great number of squatting foreigners, reducing the total possible revenues for land sales to the government.

In attempt to suppress unlawful acts, Douglas appointed regional constables, a Chief Inspector of Police (Chartres Brew), and a network of intelligence officials. He also created Assistant Gold Commissioners (he appointed Chartres Brew as Chief Gold Commissioner) to look after mining and civil cases. Such preventive measures helped ensure that the chaos accompanying the California Gold Rush was not repeated in British Columbia. He was nicknamed "Old Squaretoes" for his stiffness.

In December 1861, during the ongoing Trent Affair, Douglas argued for his London superiors to invade and conquer the Washington Territory as America was too busy in the East with the Civil War. He reasoned because there were few U.S. troops stationed in the territory since most other units stationed there were off to war in the East, the region's population was scattered, and there was little to no U.S. naval ships in the area. He also said the Royal Navy and Marines were powerful and could easily do the job, ending with a statement that "with Puget Sound, and the line of the Columbia River in our hands, we should hold the only navigable outlets of the country — command its trade, and soon compel it to submit to Her Majesty's Rule."

Continuing his service as governor, Douglas authorised construction of the government buildings known as the "Birdcages" in 1859. In 1862, with the discovery of rich gold deposits in the Cariboo region, sparking the Cariboo Gold Rush, Douglas ordered the construction of the Cariboo Road. This engineering feat ran 400 miles from Fort Yale to Barkerville through extremely hazardous canyon territory. The Cariboo road was also called the "Queen's Highway" and the "Great North Road".

Near the end of his term as governor, Douglas was criticized for not developing the colony as a self-governing body. His only political reform had been to initiate an elected Legislative Council. His argument against the creation of a self-governing colony was the state of the population: few were British subjects, most held permanent residence in the colony, and few of them owned property.

He was friends with Robert Ker, the First Auditor General of the Two Colonies of British Columbia, and John Sebastian Helmcken a future Speaker of the House of the Legislative Assembly of British Columbia. Like Douglas, they are both considered founding fathers of British Columbia. Helmcken married Douglas's daughter, Cecilia.

== Retirement and death ==
When Douglas ended his service to the Empire, Queen Victoria promoted him Knight Commander of the Order of the Bath. Upon his retirement, Douglas was honoured with banquets in both Victoria and New Westminster, the capital of the mainland. He also received a thank you on paper signed by 900 people. From 1864 to 1865, Douglas toured Europe. He visited relatives in Scotland and a half-sister in Paris. He had to return early when his daughter, Cecilia, died.

Douglas continued to be active but kept out of politics in all forms. He died in Victoria of a heart attack on August 2, 1877, at the age of 73. His funeral procession was possibly the largest in the history of B.C., and he was interred in the Ross Bay Cemetery.

== Places named for Douglas ==
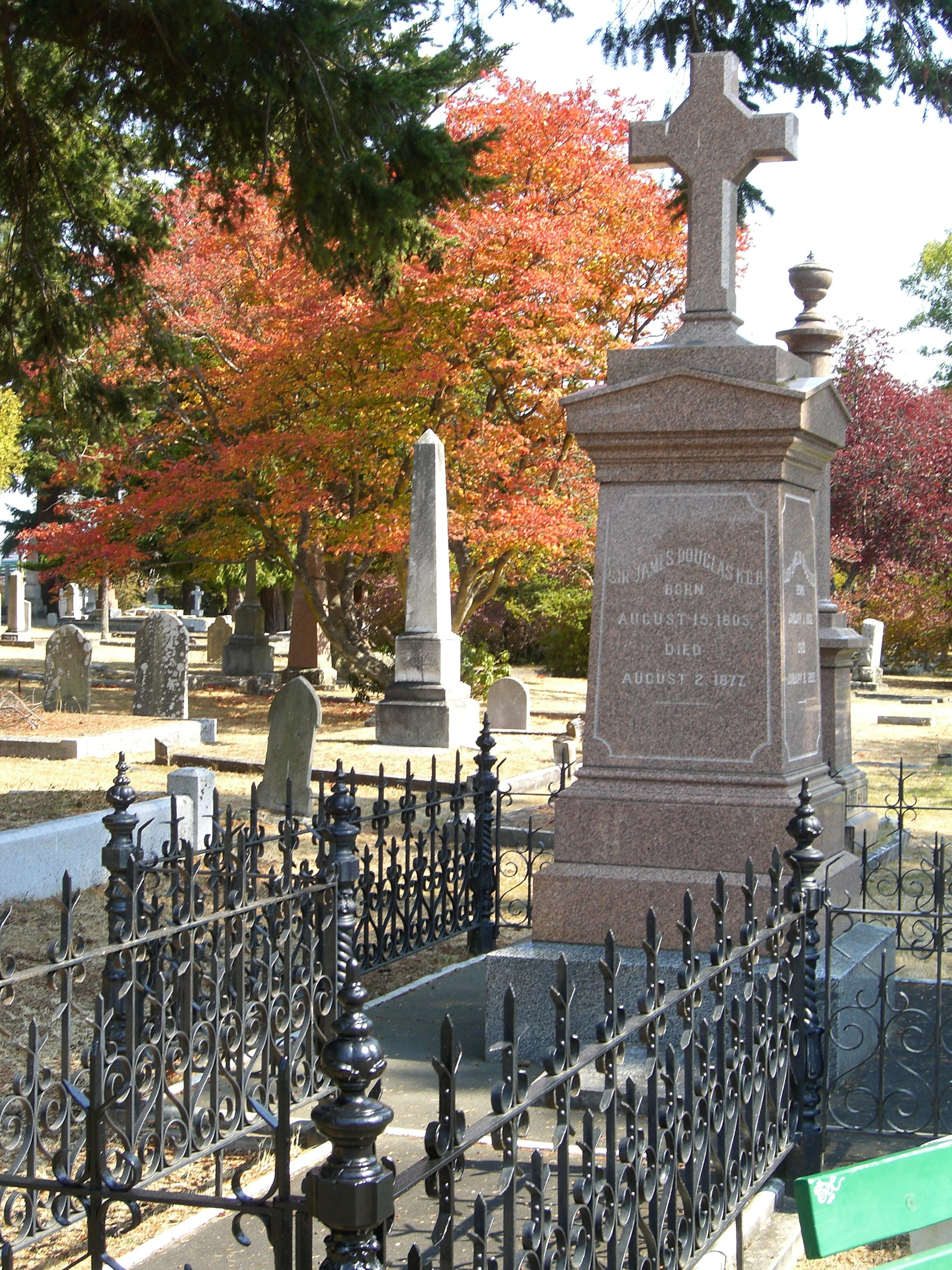
Grave of Sir James Douglas at Ross Bay Cemetery in Victoria, BC

- Port Douglas, British Columbia, a former community located on the northern end of Harrison Lake.
- The Douglas Ranges, a southernmost portion of the Coast Mountains west of Harrison Lake and east of Stave Lake.
- The Douglas Road, an important wagon road that ran via a series of lake portages from Harrison Lake north to Lillooet.
- Douglas, name of a Canada-US border crossing in Surrey, British Columbia.
- Douglas Peak, a 1,486-metre (4,875 ft) mountain of the Vancouver Island Ranges, located southeast of Port Alberni.
- Mount Douglas, a prominent, 260-metre (850 ft) hill in the Greater Victoria municipality of Saanich. Located in PKOLS park (formerly Mount Douglas Park), it is also the namesake for a high school, road, municipal park, neighbourhood, and several businesses.
- Douglas Channel, a 90-kilometre (56 mi) inlet on British Columbia's northwest coast, just southwest of Kitimat.
- Douglas Inlet, lies on the west side of Moresby Island in Haida Gwaii.
- Douglas Road, one of the first roads connecting New Westminster to Burrard Inlet, is still extant in sections in Burnaby. Not to be confused with the Douglas Road from Harrison Lake to Lillooet.
- Douglas Street (Highways 1 and 17) is a major thoroughfare in Victoria, running north from Dallas Road (Mile "0" of the Trans-Canada Highway) to Dieppe Road in the Broadmead neighbourhood of Saanich.
- Douglas College is a publicly funded community university transfer and vocational college with campuses in New Westminster and Coquitlam.
- Sir James Douglas Elementary School and Sir James Douglas Annex are public elementary schools in South East Victoria.
- Sir James Douglas Primary School, Supply, Mahaica, Demerara, Guyana.
- Numerous other elementary, middle, and secondary schools across British Columbia are named after Sir James Douglas. Among them is Sir James Douglas elementary school in Victoria, built in 1910 on the property that used to be the governor's farm.
- James Island, a privately owned, 315-hectare (780-acre) island located to the east of the Saanich Peninsula, opposite Sidney.
- James Bay, a small bay within Victoria Harbour, and the historic neighbourhood which surrounds it; this had been the governor's own property and residence before its development.
- Douglas Hall, a residence hall at Trinity Western University in Langley, BC
- Douglas Portage, a route around the "Falls of the Fraser" between Spuzzum and Yale. Originally built as part of the Hudson's Bay Brigade Trail, it became important during the Fraser Canyon Gold Rush in the absence of other routes. The name Douglas Portage was also used for the first, most southerly, portage of the Douglas Road.
- The noted Douglas Lake Cattle Company, and the lake, creek, and plateau in the area are not named for Douglas, but for a local settler of that name.

== Views on Race ==
In 1858, James Douglas, the governor of the British colony of Vancouver Island, replied to an inquiry from a group of black people in San Francisco about the possibilities of settling in his jurisdiction. They were angered that the California legislature had passed discriminatory laws to restrict black people in the state, preventing them from owning property and requiring them to wear badges. Governor Douglas, whose mother was a "free coloured" person of mixed Black and White ancestry from the Caribbean, replied favourably. Later that year, an estimated 600 to 800 black Americans migrated to Victoria, settling on Vancouver Island and Salt Spring Island. At least two became successful merchants: Peter Lester and Mifflin Wistar Gibbs. Gibbs was elected to the newly established City Council in the 1860s, but returned to the US after the abolition of slavery in that country.

== Bibliography ==
- Adams, John David (2011). Old Square-Toes and His Lady: The Life of James and Amelia Douglas. Ottawa, Ontario: Touch Wood Editions. ISBN 978-1-926971-71-1. OCLC 1178721927.
- Hauka, Donald J. (2003). McGowan's War. Vancouver: New Star Books. ISBN 9781554200016. LCCN 2004484595. OCLC 53076609. OL 3378660M.
- Scott, Laura Elaine (1983). The Imposition of British Culture as Portrayed in the New Westminster Capital Plan of 1859 to 1862 (PDF) (M. A. Thesis). Simon Fraser University.

Preceded by John McLoughlin	Chief Factor of Hudson's Bay Company; 1840–1858	Succeeded by A.G. Dallas
Preceded by Richard Blanshard	Governor of Vancouver Island; 1851–1864	Succeeded by Arthur Edward Kennedy
Preceded by Position Nonexistent	Governor of British Columbia; 1858–1864	Succeeded by Frederick Seymour
