= Factor (agent) =

Trader of goods for a commission

A factor is a type of trader who receives and sells goods on commission, called factorage. A factor is a mercantile fiduciary transacting business that operates in their own name and does not disclose their principal. A factor differs from a commission merchant in that a factor takes possession of goods (or documents of title representing goods, such as a bill of lading) on consignment, but a commission merchant sells goods not in their possession on the basis of samples.

Most modern factor business is in the textile field, but factors are also used to a great extent in the shoe, furniture, hardware, and other industries. The number of trade areas in which factors operate has increased. In the United Kingdom, most factors fall within the definition of a mercantile agent under the Factors Act 1889 (52 & 53 Vict. c. 45), (Note: Section 1(1) of the Factors Act 1889 defines a mercantile agent as "a mercantile agent having in the customary course of his business as such agent authority either to sell goods, or to consign goods for the purpose of sale, or to buy goods, or to raise money on the security of goods".) and therefore have the powers of such. A factor has a possessory lien over the consigned goods that covers any claims against the principal arising out of the factor's activity.

The term derives from the Latin for "doer, maker", from facit, "he/she/it does/makes". Historically, a factor had their seat at a sort of trading post known as a factory.

== History ==
Before the 20th century, factors were mercantile intermediaries whose main functions were warehousing and selling consigned goods, accounting to principals for the proceeds, guaranteeing buyers' credit, and sometimes making cash advances to principals prior to the sale of the goods. Their services were of particular value in foreign trade, and factors became important figures in the great period of colonial exploration and development.

=== Mercantile factors ===
A relatively large mercantile company could have a hierarchy including several grades of factor. The British East India Company hierarchy ranked "factors" between "writers" (junior clerks) and "junior merchants".

In North America the Hudson's Bay Company, as restructured after merging with the North West Company in 1821, had commissioned officers who included the ranks of chief trader and chief factor. They all shared the profits of the company during its monopoly years. In the deed poll under which the HBC was governed, there were 25 chief factors and 28 chief traders. Chief factors usually held high administrative positions.

The Dutch East India Company and the British East India Company based factors at trading posts in numerous sites all over Asia. In 18th- and early 19th-century China and Japan, however, the governments limited European traders to small, defined areas: the Dutch Factory was allowed to operate on Dejima, an island off Nagasaki, before the opening of trade with Japan; and in China the British were limited to Thirteen Factories and Shamian Island areas of Canton.

=== Colonial factors ===
In territories without any other regular authorities, especially if in need of defence, the company could mandate its factor to perform the functions of a governor, theoretically under authority of a higher echelon, including command of a small garrison. For example, Banten, on the Indonesian island of Java, was from 1603 to 1682 a trading post established by the East India Company and run by a series of chief factors.

The term and its compounds are also used to render equivalent positions in other languages, such as:

- Chief factor for the Dutch oppercommies, for instance of the Dutch West India Company on the Slave Coast of West Africa.
- Chief factor for the Dutch opperhoofd (literally 'supreme head'; but also used for a Tribal Chief, as a Sachem of American Indians), e.g. in the Dutch factory on Dejima, mentioned above.

=== Debt factors ===
A debt factor, whether a person or firm (factoring company), accepts as assignee book debts (accounts receivable) as security for short-term loans; this is known as factoring.

== Judicial factor ==
In Scottish law, a judicial factor is a kind of trustee appointed by the Court of Session to administer an estate, for a ward (called a pupil) until a guardian (called a tutor) can be appointed (factor loco tutoris), for a person who is incapax, or for a partnership that is unable to function.

== Notable factors ==
- James Douglas (1803–1877) was a Hudson's Bay Company Chief Factor who became Governor of Vancouver Island and later the entirety of British Columbia
- Alexander Grant Dallas (1816–1882) was a Chief Factor who became superintendent of the west-of-the-Rockies portion of the Hudson's Bay Company and the Governor of Rupert's Land in North America, areas now in the United States and Canada

== See also ==
- Beaver Club
- Cotton factor, a broker or commission merchant
- Moose Factory
- York Factory
- Comprador
