= Fur brigade =

Convoys of canoes and boats

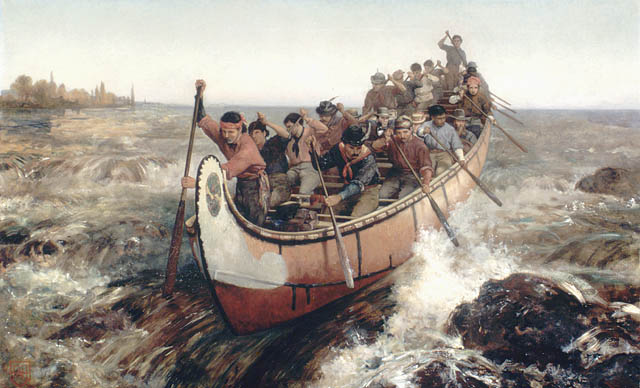
While this famous painting by Frances Anne Hopkins portrays voyageurs, the regular canoe brigades were often manned by natives, operating the same way.

Fur brigades were convoys of canoes and boats used to transport supplies, trading goods and furs in the North American fur trade industry. Much of it consisted of native fur trappers, most of whom were Métis, and fur traders who traveled between their home trading posts and a larger Hudson's Bay Company or Northwest Company post in order to supply the inland post with goods and supply the coastal post with furs.

Travel was usually done on the rivers by canoe or, in certain prairie situations, by horse. For example, they might travel to Hudson Bay or James Bay from their inland home territories. This pattern was most prevalent during the early 19th century. Canoes were eventually replaced by York boats because they were more economically and physically efficient.

== Terminology and definition ==
The term "fur brigade" can also be referred to in more specific terms like "canoe brigade", "birch-bark brigade", or even simply as "brigade" Fur brigades were not only limited to watercraft their respective routes both overland and through bodies of water. It is also used to describe teams of horses or dog sledges pursuing the same task. Hubert Howe Bancroft writes that it was not uncommon to see groups of horses carrying a number of pelts in British Columbia"Fur Brigade" here functions as a category rather than a single historically standardized name. Early European trading posts and routes in North America on the St. Lawrence River helped to stimulate trade with native groups such as the Algonquin, Huron, and Mistassini Cree. These native groups, like many others, transported trade wares in canoes.As European trade in the continent grew, more inland routes were investigated. The concept of canoe and overland routes in a non-native context was largely pioneered by Alexander Mackenzie in 1793, Simon Fraser's expedition in 1808, and David Thompson's expedition in 1811. Confusion over paths of the Columbia and Fraser Rivers when western explorers communicated with native peoples of the area caused an overland connection to be formed, dubbed a "brigade trail".

== Cargo and logistics ==
An example of a fur brigade's cargo can be illuminated from an account of a brigade originating at Lachine, a small town 9 miles south of Montreal on the St. Lawrence River. 30 boats were divided into three brigades, and each boat had a pilot to act as both a guide and captain. In every craft, there were 8-10 men. In addition, there would be a large amount of baggage, in addition to six hundred pounds of biscuits, two hundred pounds of pork, three bushels of peas. Also present was a litany of extra supplies, such as kettles, axes, and repair kits. Bancroft notes in his account that the watercraft were so loaded down with men and materiel that the gunwales were sitting a mere 6 inches above the waterline.Alexander Henry, a British trade at Fort Micilimackinac, described a similar system for birch-bark canoes. In his records, each brigade had 3-4 canoes, and a guide to complement each brigade. The route for this brigade stretched from Montreal to Micilimackinac and back. The brigade guide was responsible for not only the command of the brigade, but also for any loss incurred on the voyage. This was codified into regulation under the French government.Food was a pressing problem for fur brigades, and was solved in a variety of ways to feed each person when they were burning 4000-5000 calories per day. Often, the men had neither the time nor energy during transit to hunt and fish, and as such a variety of foods, including pemmican, dried peas, and dried pork were packed for the trip. Sometimes, food could be gathered en route depending on the route. Wild rice, corn, and maple sugar were among the items foraged.When possible, hunting for meat allowed for the consumption of both salted and fresh meat. At forts, small gardens were typically available to supplement diets with vegetables and wild rice. Return trips, in the same fashion as outgoing trips, carried mail between trading cities and outposts. This allowed for a method of communication despite the long distancesWhen selecting a watercraft type, the Hudson's Bay Company and the Northwest Company used different craft for their brigade purposes. The former used York boats as the preferred direct route of the Saskatchewan-Nelson river allowed the usage of heavier and more unwieldy craft, due to the few obstacles on the river. The Hudson's Bay Company was able to carry more cargo and required less specialized crew to navigate their brigade boats, as the raft was highly durable. In contrast, the Northwest Company used birch-bark canoes as their routes had more rapids and obstacles

== Canoe ==
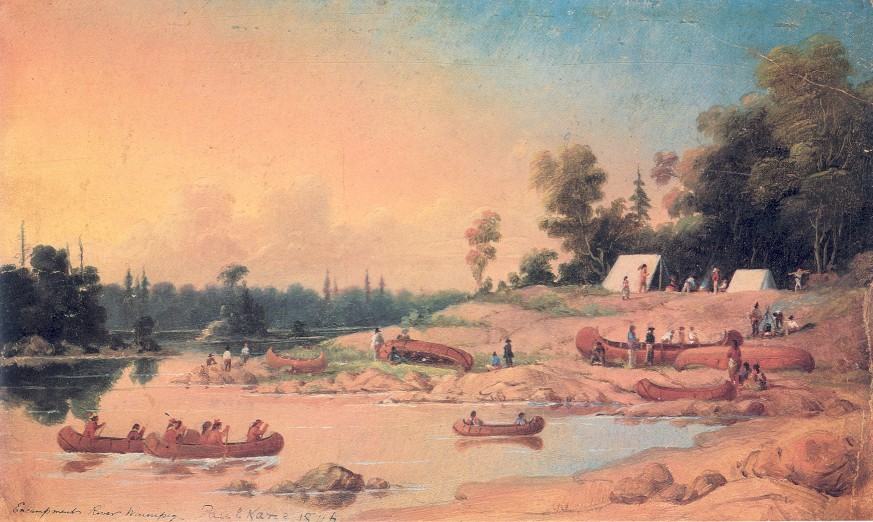
Paul Kane's Encampment shows a canoe brigade camp on the Winnipeg River in June 1848 being visited by a group of Saulteaux

Fur brigades began with the need to transport furs trapped during the winter to markets, where the furs could be exchanged for European trade goods. They evolved from small brigades of canoes from native villages traveling to meet fur traders at pre-selected meeting places to traders going out in canoes to meet the trappers in their home territory with forts or posts being established along the way.

One common fur brigade was by canoe, conducted by voyageurs or others. Downstream loads to locations such as York Factory on the Hudson Bay or to Montreal on the St. Lawrence River consisted mainly of furs. Upstream loads from York Factory and Montreal consisted of trading goods and the ammunition, traps and various other supplies needed for the next winters trapping season. These brigades were usually an annual event.

These canoe routes became part of a complex transportation system during the North American fur trade. Supplies, trading goods and furs were carried between the various forts and posts along the fur trade routes and the furs would be shipped every year to the world markets.

== York boats ==
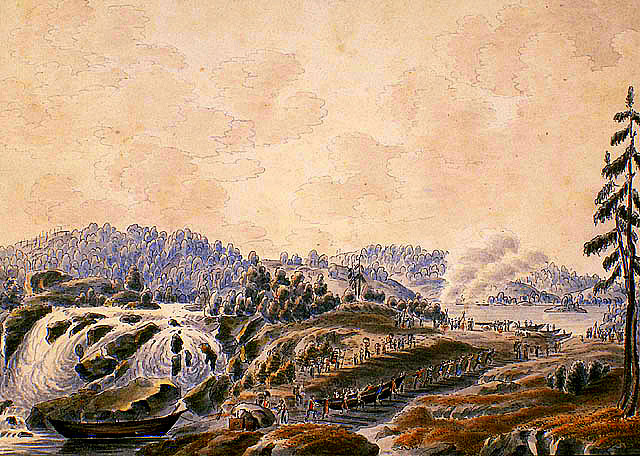
A brigade of York boats at a portage by Peter Rindisbacher in 1821

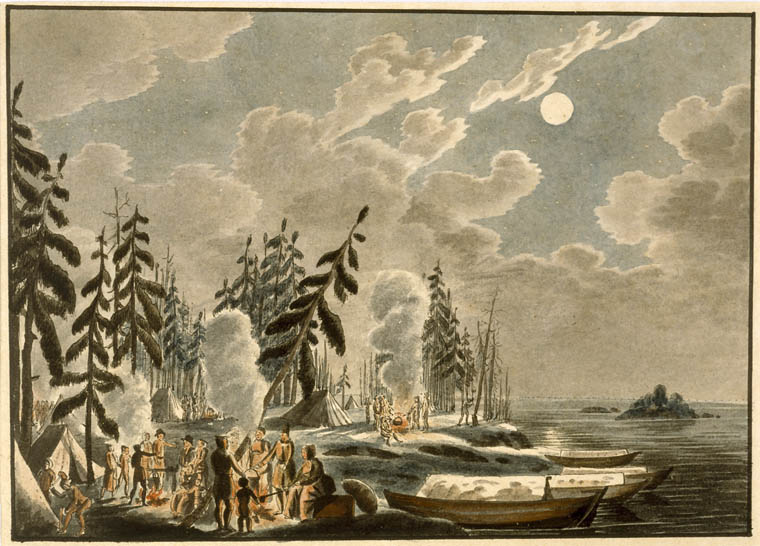
Brigade of York boats camping on Lake Winnipeg by Peter Rindisbacher in 1821 showing sails being used as boat coverings.

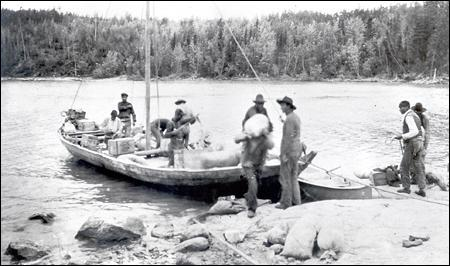
A York boat in use in 1910

In the 1790s, York boats were created in response to the transportation problems that canoes posed. Canoes were fragile, had a limited capacity, and required large crews. York boats were the more economical option as they were durable, had a large capacity, and did not require much manpower. This allowed the Hudson's Bay Company to transport people and goods across Canada efficiently. Hudson's Bay Company administrator George Simpson kept some canoes for personal journeys, and occasionally loaned them for travel, but York boats otherwise became the dominant mode of transportation on waterways suitable for their use.

York boats were made by searching forests for suitable wood, floating the wood back to posts on waterways, and then sawing wood into keels, planks, stems, and gunnels. Trading posts had specific areas set aside for York boat building. York boats were similar in structure to Orkney Isles fishing boats, likely because many of the men employed by the Hudson's Bay Company were Orkneymen. These boats most often traveled in brigades, transporting supplies and trading goods.

By the 1820s, the Hudson's Bay Company had several York boat brigades traveling distinct routes. Permanent trading posts had been built at strategic sites along the main brigade routes and as soon as the waterways were free of ice the fur brigades would carry trade goods and food supplies to replenish the various trading posts along their route and pick up the accumulation of furs caught during the winter season. They also carried mail and passengers.

The boat brigades were mostly crewed by Métis as were almost all the men employed by the Hudson's Bay Company in western Canada at the time. The York boats from Red River of the Portage La Loche brigades in 1862 were crewed by French Métis with a few Swampy Cree and Chippewa Christians. In 1862, Father Émile Petitot quoted William J. Christie then the chief factor of Fort Edmonton as saying in French; "I am myself a Métis." "We are almost all Métis in the Company. Among the chief factors there is not a single Englishman, and maybe not ten Scots with pure blood." (translation)

"Three brigades plied the Saskatchewan and Red River waterways of the Northern department. The Red River brigade transported furs and goods between the Red River Settlement and Norway House and between Norway House and York Factory. The Portage la Loche brigade was recruited at Red River to transport goods to Norway House and thence northwest via the Churchill River system to Portage la Loche, where cargo was exchanged with the Athabaska brigade before returning to Norway House and finally to Red River. The third brigade, the Saskatchewan brigade, was recruited in the region of Fort Edmonton, trip-ping to Norway House and York Factory before returning to the Upper Saskatchewan." (Manitoba History)

The crews of some of these fur brigades had nicknames, some derived from their dietary habits. The Red River "tripmen" were called the Taureaux. A "Taureau" is a bag of pemmican weighing about 90 pounds. The Portage La Loche brigade's tripmen were called the Poissons-blancs (whitefish) and the Saskatchewan River brigade based in Fort Edmonton the Blaireaux (badgers). Les Cygnes (the swans) were from the Swan River district based in Fort Pelly, Les Rabasca (Athabascans) from the Athabasca district based in Fort Chipewyan and Les Gens de la Grande Riviere (men of the great river) from the Mackenzie River district based in Fort Simpson. The brigades were intensely rivalrous and would frequently stage fistfights between their "champions" to defend the brigade's honor. The challenger would strut about adorned with feathers in his cap bragging about his prowess (chantant le coq).

== Famous brigades ==
- Portage La Loche Brigade
- York Factory Express

== See also ==
- Hudson's Bay Brigade Trail
- Dalles des Morts
- North American fur trade
