= Columbia boat =

Canoe-like cargo boat used in the Pacific Northwest

The Columbia boat was a type of inland boat, distinct from the York Boat, used to carry furs, trade goods, supplies, and passengers along the Columbia River during the fur trade era, c. 1811–1845. It needed to be large enough to carry substantial cargo, light enough to portage around such obstacles as falls and rapids, and made of locally sourced materials. It was modeled after the birchbark canoe used in waterways east of the Rocky Mountains, but was sheathed with thin cedar planks.

== History and construction ==
North West Company explorer David Thompson built the first prototype of the Columbia boat in 1811, when he crossed the Rocky Mountains via Athabasca pass. At the spot on the Columbia River known thereafter as Boat Encampment, Thompson searched for birchbark to make a canoe. What little he found was too thin, so he sheathed the canoe with planks split from cedar.

In 1824 Hudson's Bay Company Chief Factor Alexander Kennedy, John McLoughlin's predecessor as superintendent of HBC's Columbia District, acknowledged David Thompson as the originator of the Columbia boat, while providing details on the boat's construction and use: "The means of transport from Fort George to the posts in the interior has hitherto been by boats of a peculiar construction. They are made in imitation of bark canoes, and have been much improved upon since the first invention by Mr. David Thompson. Boats now used carry from 40 to 50 pieces [of cargo, weighing 90 pounds each], and are navigated by 8 men each. They are wrought by paddles instead of oars, and are carried over the portages on mens shoulders, but it requires the crews of two boats to carry one."

In 1825, the HBC clerk John Work recorded in the Spokane House post journal that "the sawyers finished the wood for 3 boats, in all 73 boards 6 Inches wide and 40 feet long & 3 broad pieces for keels 40 feet long & 14 Inches wide, and 6 pieces for gunwales 40 feet long & 2 Inches wide in 15 days." By this account, each boat would have a wide flat keel and six overlapping strakes on each side, plus a gunwale. Work also noted that "the sawyers squared a log for boards to make a steaming box" to be used to soften the rib pieces so they could be bent into the proper shapes to form the curved hull.

U.S. Navy Lt. Charles Wilkes, who, as commander of the United States Exploring Expedition, visited the Pacific Northwest in 1841, described Columbia boats as having "great strength and buoyancy, carry three tons weight, and have a crew of eight men, besides a padroon. They are thirty feet long and five and a half feet beam, sharp at both ends, clinker-built, and have no knees. In building them, flat timbers of oak are bent to the requisite shape by steaming; they are bolted to a flat keel, at distances of a foot from each other. The planks are of cedar, and generally extend the whole length of the boat. The gunwale is of the same kind of wood, but the rowlocks are of birch. . . . They answer, and indeed are admirably adapted to, all the purposes for which they are intended; are so light as to be easily transported over the portages by their crews, and in case of accident are easily repaired."

In 1845, British Army Lt. Henry Warre described the Columbia boat: "I left Fort Colvile on the 19th August, embarked below the Falls in a boat belonging to the H. B. Company expressly adapted to this dangerous river navigation, and descended the rapids. These boats are built of cedar after the model of a bark canoe, the planks being riveted to the ribs, having no knees, and the seams filled with pitch and gum. They are propelled with oars by 5 men and steered with a paddle." Here is a painting of a Columbia Boat by Warre. The cargo has been unloaded, and two men are using poles to push the boat, while others on the shore pull on a line.

Gum made by heating spruce pitch and mixing it with tallow was used to seal the seams between the overlapping (clinker-built) planks. Joseph Drayton, a member of the Wilkes expedition, described the gumming operation: "On landing the goods, the boats are tracked up and turned bottom up, when they are suffered to dry; two flat-sided pieces of fire-wood, about two feet long, are then laid together, and put into the fire, until both are well lighted, and the wood burns readily at one end and in the space between; they then draw the lighted end slowly along the gummed seam, blowing at the same time between the sticks: this melts the gum, and a small spatula is used to smooth it off and render the seam quite tight."

Columbia boats were first built by the North West Company at Fort George (formerly Fort Astoria), then at Spokane House. After the Hudson's Bay Company established Fort Colvile on the Columbia River just above Kettle Falls, in 1825, it became the main boatbuilding center, because it was on the main stem of the Columbia and was near a good stand of cedar.

In 1980 the staff of Parks Canada used Wilkes's description as the basis for drawing detailed construction plans for a replica Columbia boat. The plans are on file in the Underwater Archaeology Department of Parks Canada, Ottawa, and in the Cultural Resources Department at Fort Vancouver National Historic Site, Vancouver, Washington.

== Nomenclature and genealogy ==
The term Columbia boat was used in HBC inventories, to distinguish them from other types of river craft. Although French-Canadian voyageurs used the term batteau (modern spelling bateau), which is simply the French word for boat, Company journals and correspondence always used the term boat, not batteaux or bateau.

Both Columbia boats, west of the Rockies, and York boats, east of the Rockies, were used in the fur trade in the first half of the nineteenth century, but the two types of inland watercraft had quite different genealogies and design features. York boats were supposedly descended from the Orkney yole. They had carvel (edge-to-edge) planking, a fixed rudder, and were too heavy to carry over portages. No York boats were made or used west of the Rocky Mountains. In contrast, Columbia boats were modeled on the birchbark canoe, which in turn was invented and developed by the Native people of the eastern woodlands of North America. Columbia boats had clinker (overlapping edge) planking, were steered by a paddle or oar, and needed to be light enough to carry around waterfalls and rapids when necessary.

== Use ==
Columbia boats were used to carry passengers, baggage, and correspondence on the York Factory Express that left Fort Vancouver, HBC's Columbia District headquarters, in late March, bound for the company's North American headquarters on Hudson Bay. They went as far as Boat Encampment, 981 miles (1,477 km) from Fort Vancouver. From there the Express crossed the Rocky Mountains on foot, then descended the eastern river system in York boats. When the Columbia Express returned in the fall, it again used Columbia boats to descend the river. A full portage was always necessary at Kettle Falls, just below Fort Colvile.

Columbia boats were used in the annual New Caledonia brigades between the interior of modern British Columbia to Fort Vancouver. The year's harvest ("returns") of furs left Fort St. James in April, descending the Fraser River to Fort Alexandria. Horse pack trains then continued on to Fort Okanagan, where the brigade again switched back to boats, joined by the fur returns from Fort Colvile. The combined brigade from Okanagan normally required nine boats crewed by about seventy voyageurs. After taking on the returns from Fort Nez Percés, full or partial portages were necessary at Celilo Falls, the Dalles, and at the Cascades Rapids. The brigade usually arrived at Fort Vancouver in early July, and about two weeks later headed back up the Columbia loaded with supplies and trade goods. An additional two or three boats brought the fur returns of the Snake Country brigade from Fort Nez Percés to Fort Vancouver, and took supplies and trade goods back. During its high point from 1825 to 1845, this system required about fifteen Columbia boats at any one time. Because of the relative fragility due to their light weight, and the wear and tear from portaging and damage from traversing shallow and rocky rapids Columbia boats had a relatively short usable life. About one hundred of them may have been built at Fort Colvile in the 1825-45 period.
