= Fort Vancouver =

Coordinates: 45°37′21″N 122°39′45″W

- Fort Vancouver National Historic Site
- U.S. National Register of Historic Places
- U.S. National Historic Site
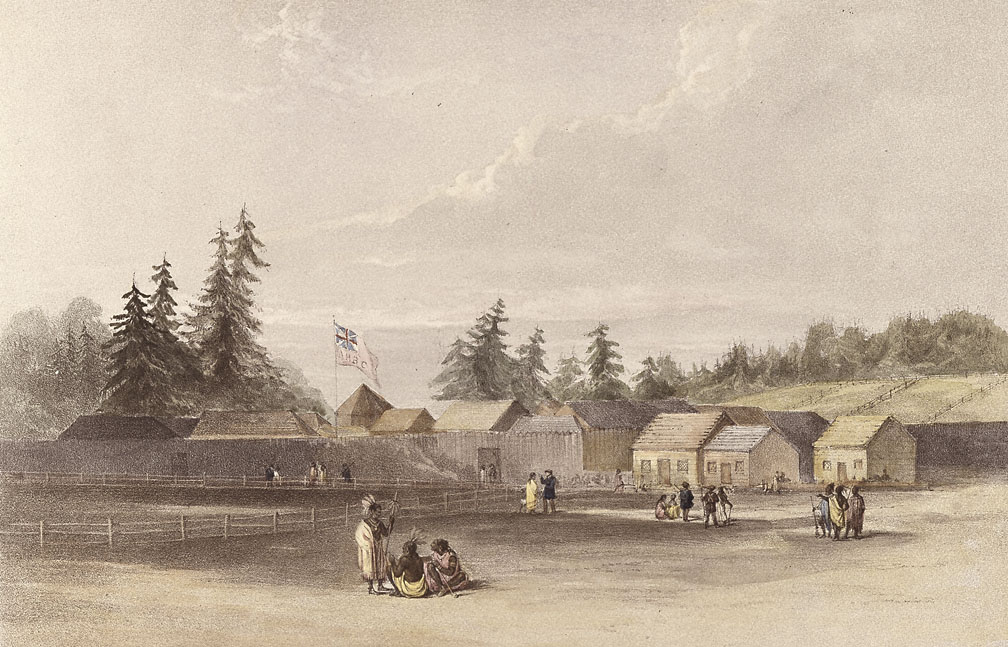
- Fort Vancouver in 1845

- Location within Washington (state) Location within the United States
- Location: Vancouver, Washington, United States
- Built: Winter 1824–1825
- NRHP reference No.: 66000370
- Added to NRHP: October 15, 1966

Fort Vancouver was an early 19th-century British fur trading post in the disputed region of Oregon Country in the Pacific Northwest. The factory was the principal settlement of the Hudson's Bay Company (HBC) in what was known as the Columbia Department. It was built in the winter of 1824–1825 and named for Captain George Vancouver, a Royal Navy officer and explorer who lead the Vancouver Expedition through this part of the Pacific Coast in the late 18th century.

The HBC fort, which was located on the northern bank of the Columbia River, was the center of the regional fur trade. Every year trade goods and supplies from London arrived by mercantile shipping from across the Pacific Ocean or overland from Hudson Bay via the York Factory Express. Indigenous people would trade fur pelts at the fort for these supplies and trade goods. Furs from Fort Vancouver were exported globally. Some were shipped to the Qing dynasty via Guangzhou where they were traded for Chinese manufactured goods for sale in Britain. At its peak, Fort Vancouver controlled 34 outposts, 24 ports, six ships, and 600 employees.

In 1846 Great Britain signed the Oregon Treaty which ceded the land around Fort Vancouver to the United States. Although the treaty permitted the HBC to continue trading, it effectively ended operations resulting in the closure of Fort Vancouver.

The fort, which is now in present-day Vancouver, Washington, has been preserved as the Fort Vancouver National Historic Site. The park contains a full-scale replica of the Hudson Bay Company outpost which is open to the public.

== Background ==
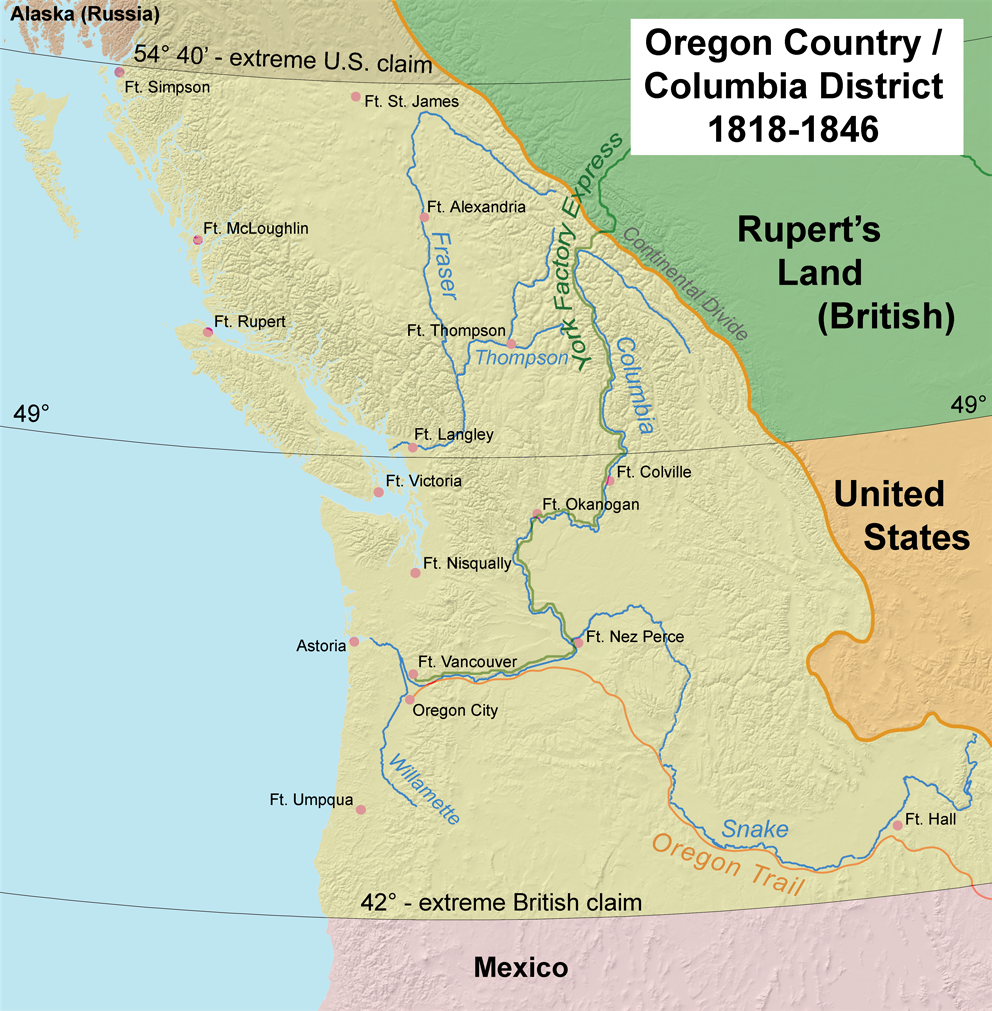
Map of the Pacific Northwest "jointly occupied" by the US and Britain. The influence of Fort Vancouver and its secondary stations extended from Russian America to Mexican ruled Alta California.

During the War of 1812, the Pacific Northwest was a distant region of the conflict. Two rival fur trading outfits, the Canadian North West Company (NWC) and the American Pacific Fur Company (PFC), had until then both operated in the region peaceably. Funded largely by John Jacob Astor, the PFC operated without many opportunities for military defense by the United States Navy. News of the war and of a coming British warship put the American company in a difficult position. In October 1813, management met at Fort Astoria and agreed to transfer its assets to the NWC. HMS Racoon arrived the following month and in honor of George III of the United Kingdom, Fort Astoria was renamed to Fort George.

In negotiations with American Albert Gallatin throughout 1818, British plenipotentiary Frederick John Robinson was offered a proposition for a partition that would have, as Gallatin stated, "all the waters emptying in the sound called the Gulf of Georgia." Frederick Merk has argued the definition used by the negotiators of the Gulf of Georgia included the entirety of the Puget Sound, in addition to the Straits of Georgia and Juan de Fuca. This would have given the United Kingdom the most favorable location for ports north of Alta California and south of Russian America. Robinson did not agree to the proposal and subsequent talks did not focus on establishing a permanent border west of the Rocky Mountains.

The Treaty of 1818 made the resources of the vast region were to be "free and open" to citizens from either nation. The treaty wasn't made to combine American and British interests against other colonial powers in the region. Rather, the document states that the joint occupancy of the Pacific Northwest was intended to "prevent disputes" between the two nations from arising. In the ensuing years, the North West Company continued to expand its operations in the Pacific Northwest. Skirmishes with its major competitor, the Hudson's Bay Company, had already flared into the Pemmican War. The end of the conflict in 1821 saw the NWC mandated by the British Government to merge into the HBC.

=== Later negotiations ===
Throughout 1825 and 1826, British officials continued to offer Americans partition plans for the Pacific Coast of North America. These largely originated in part from correspondence with the NWC and later HBC. The border would continue to extend west on the 49th parallel to the Rocky Mountains, where the Columbia (and some times the Snake River) would be used as the border until it reached the Pacific Ocean. Secretary of State for Foreign Affairs George Canning has been appraised by later historians as the most supportive British Foreign minister in securing a border along the Columbia. United States Secretary of State Henry Clay had given instructions to the American plenipotentiaries to offer a partition of the Pacific Northwest along the 49th parallel to the Pacific Ocean. The difference in the two considered plans were too much to solve, making the diplomats put off a formal colonial division once more.

== Establishment ==
Hudson's Bay Company Flag

Fort Vancouver was established on the north bank of the Columbia River in the winter of 1824–1825. The London-based Hudson's Bay Company established it to serve as the headquarters of the company's interior fur trade. In the early 1820s a general reorganization of all NWC properties, now entirely under HBC management, was overseen directly by Sir George Simpson. The newly established Columbia District needed a more suitable headquarters than Fort George at the mouth of the Columbia. Simpson was instrumental in the establishment of Fort Vancouver. Using the HBC position that any settlement of the Oregon boundary dispute would confirm the border placement along the Columbia; Simpson selected a location situated opposite from the mouth of the Willamette River. This expanse was an open and fertile prairie that was outside the flood plain and had easy access to the Columbia.

== Fort ==
=== Description ===
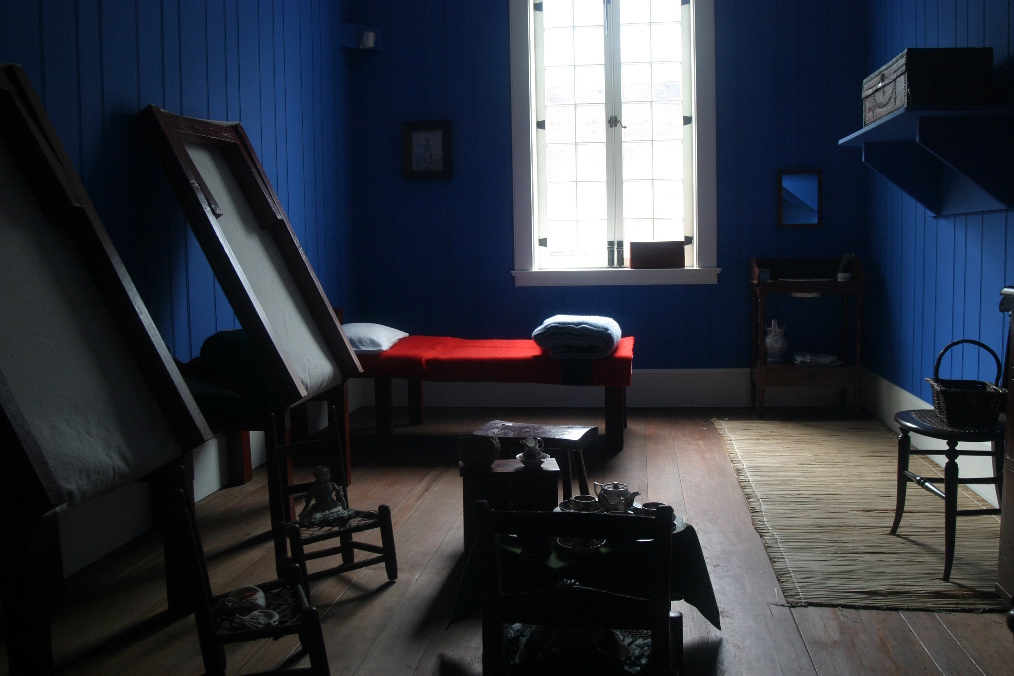
Cots in the Douglas Quarters inside the Chief Factor's house

An employee of the HBC, wrote a general description of Fort Vancouver and its structural composition as it was in 1843:

The fort is in the shape of a parallelogram, about 250 yards long, by 150 broad; enclosed by a sort of wooden wall, made of pickets, or large beams firmly fixed in the ground, and closely fitted together, twenty feet high, and strongly secured on the inside by buttresses. At each angle there is a bastion, mounting two twelve pounders, and in the centre there some eighteen pounders; ... these cannon have become useless. The area within is divided into two courts, around which are arranged about forty neat, strong wooden buildings, one story high, designed for various purposes...

The fort was substantial. The palisades that protected it were 750 ft (230 m) long, 450 ft (140 m) wide and about 20 ft (6.1 m) high. Inside, there were 24 buildings, including housing, warehouses, a school, a library, a pharmacy, a chapel, a blacksmith, plus a large manufacturing facility. The Chief Factor's residence in the center of Fort Vancouver was two stories tall. Inside was a dining hall where company clerks, traders, physicians, and others of the gentleman class would dine with the supervising Chief Factor. In general, the entirety of the Chief Factor's House and its meals were typically barred for general laborers and fur trappers. After dinner the majority of these gentlemen would relocate to the "Bachelor's Hall" to "amuse themselves as they please, either in smoking, reading, or telling and listening to stories of their own and others' curious adventures". As Dunn recalled;

The smoking room ... presents the appearance of an armory and a museum. All sorts of weapons, and dresses, and curiosities of civilized and savage life, and of the various implements for the prosecution of the [fur] trade, may be seen there.

Outside the ramparts there was additional housing, as well as fields, gardens, fruit orchards, a shipyard, a distillery, a tannery, a sawmill, and a dairy. By 1843, situated roughly 600 yards outside Fort Vancouver were about sixty wooden houses. This small settlement was inhabited by fur trappers, machinists and other laborers of the fort. There they resided with their Indigenous or Métis wives and families. The dwellings were organized into orderly rows. The settlement was commonly referred to as Kanaka Village because of the many Hawaiians in company employ who lived there. In fact, it has been suggested that the Fort had the "largest single group of Hawaiians ever to congregate outside their home islands".

=== Fur trade operations ===
With high demand from Europe for felt hats made from beaver fur, in the early 19th Century the HBC was eager to expand its fur trade operations across North America to the Pacific Northwest. Prior to the establishment of Fort Vancouver, the HBC's largest westward fort was Fort William in present-day Ontario, which the company gained through its merger with the NWC. From its establishment, Fort Vancouver was the regional headquarters of the HBC's fur trade operations in the Columbia District. The territory it oversaw stretched from the Rocky Mountains in the east to the Pacific Ocean in the west, and from Sitka in the north to San Francisco in the south. Fur trappers would bring pelts collected during the winter to the fort to be traded in exchange for company credit. The credit, issued by the company clerks, could be used to purchase goods in the fort's trade shops. Furs from throughout the Columbia District were brought to Fort Vancouver from smaller HBC outposts either overland, or by water via the Columbia River on large canoe-like Columbia boats. Once they were sorted and inventoried by the company's clerks, the furs were hung out to dry in the fur storehouse, a large two-story post-on-sill building located within the walls of the fort. After the furs had been processed, they were sorted, weighed into 270-pound (120 kg) piles, then squeezed in a large press and wrapped in elk or bear hide to create overseas fur bales. The large 270-pound bales were then placed on ships on the Columbia River for shipment to London. The furs would then be auctioned off to hat manufacturers in London. A large demand came from hatters who produced popular beaver felted hats.

=== Personnel ===
For most of its existence, Fort Vancouver was the largest non-Indigenous settlement in the Pacific Northwest. The population of the fort and the environs was mostly French Canadians, Métis, and Kanaka Hawaiians; there were also English, Scots, Irish, and a variety of Indigenous peoples including Iroquois and Cree. The common language spoken at the fort was Canadian French, while company records and official journals were kept in English. However, trading and relations with the surrounding community were done in Chinook Jargon, a pidgin of Chinook, Nootka, Chehalis, English, French, Hawaiian, and other elements.

A survey of the total personnel at Fort Vancouver in 1846 reveals a culturally and materially diverse populace. Notably, the number of employees from the Hebrides, Orkney, and Shetland Islands was 57 men. This is exactly the same number as the combined number of workers from England and mainland Scotland. The number of men hired from Upper Canada, Lower Canada, and Rupert's Land was in total 91. These men came from English, French Canadian, Métis, Iroquois, Cree, and other cultural backgrounds. Most notable however, was that Kanaka Hawaiians totaled 154 that year, or 43% of the total fort population.

Chief Factor Dr. John McLoughlin was its first manager, a position he held for nearly 22 years, from 1824 to 1845. McLoughlin applied the laws of Upper Canada to British subjects, kept peace with the natives and sought to maintain law and order with American settlers as well. McLoughlin was later hailed as the Father of Oregon for allowing Americans to settle south of the Columbia River. Against the company's wishes, he provided substantial aid and assistance to westbound American settlers in the territory. He left the company in 1846 to found Oregon City in the Willamette Valley.

James Douglas spent nineteen years in Fort Vancouver; serving as a clerk until 1834 when he was promoted to the rank of Chief Trader. From October 1838 to November 1839, while McLoughlin was on furlough in Europe, Chief Trader Douglas was in charge. In November 1839 Douglas was promoted to the rank of Chief Factor. Douglas took on several temporary assignments elsewhere, to set up HBC's trading post at Yerba Buena (San Francisco) California in 1841, and to establish Fort Victoria in 1843, but from 1839 to 1845 there were normally two Chief Factors based at Fort Vancouver, with McLoughlin in charge and Douglas as his subordinate.

=== Agricultural production ===
At its inception, Governor George Simpson wanted the fort to be self-sufficient as food was costly to ship. Fort staff typically maintained one year's extra supplies in the fort warehouses to avoid the disastrous consequences of shipwrecks and other calamities. Fort Vancouver eventually began to produce a surplus of food, some of which was used to provision other HBC posts in the Columbia Department. The area around the fort was commonly known as "La Jolie Prairie" (the pretty prairie) or "Belle Vue Point" (beautiful vista). In time, Fort Vancouver diversified its economic activities beyond fur trading and begin exporting agricultural foodstuffs from HBC farms, along with salmon, lumber, and other products. It developed markets for these exports in Russian America, the Hawaiian Kingdom, and Mexican California. The HBC opened agencies in Sitka, Honolulu, and Yerba Buena (San Francisco) to facilitate such trade.

== Express ==
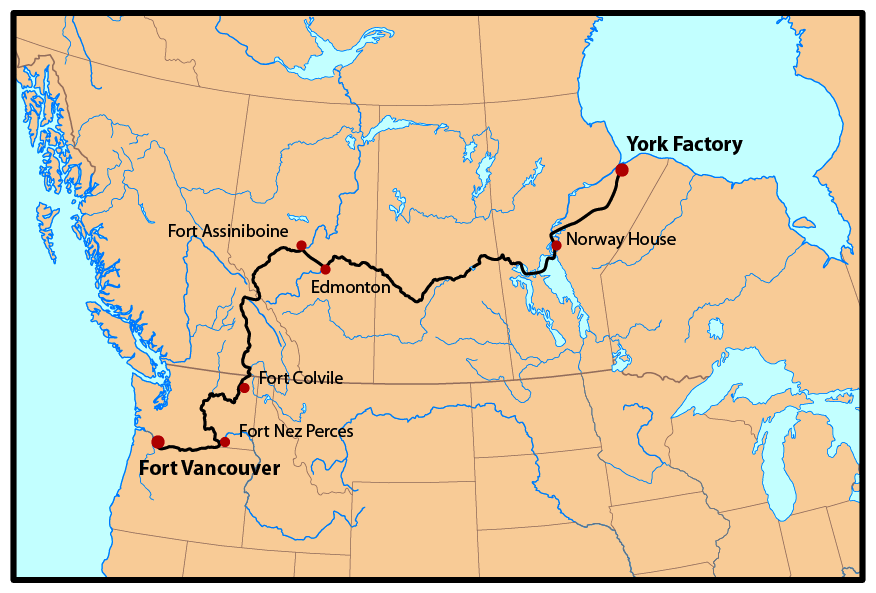
Route of the HBC York Factory Express, 1820s to 1840s. Modern political boundaries shown.

Fort Vancouver was supplied in part through the overland York Factory Express. It originated from a route used by the NWC between Fort George to Fort William on Lake Superior. Each spring two brigades were sent, one from Fort Vancouver and the other from York Factory. A typical brigade consisted of about forty to seventy five men. These men carried supplies, furs and correspondence by boat, horseback and in backpacks for various HBC posts and personnel along the route. Furs stored at the York Factory would in turn be sold at London in an annual fur sale. Indians along the way were often paid in trade goods to help them portage around falls and unnavigable rapids.

== Americans ==
The HBC, which controlled the fur trade in much of what Americans styled the Oregon Country, had previously discouraged settlement because it interfered with the lucrative fur trade. By 1838, however, American settlers were coming across the Rocky Mountains and their numbers increased each subsequent year. Many left from St. Louis, Missouri, and followed a fairly straight, but difficult, route called the Oregon Trail. For many settlers the fort became the last stop on the Oregon Trail where they could get supplies before starting their homestead.

During the Great Migration of 1843 an estimated 700 to 1,000 American settlers arrived via the Oregon Trail.

== British response ==
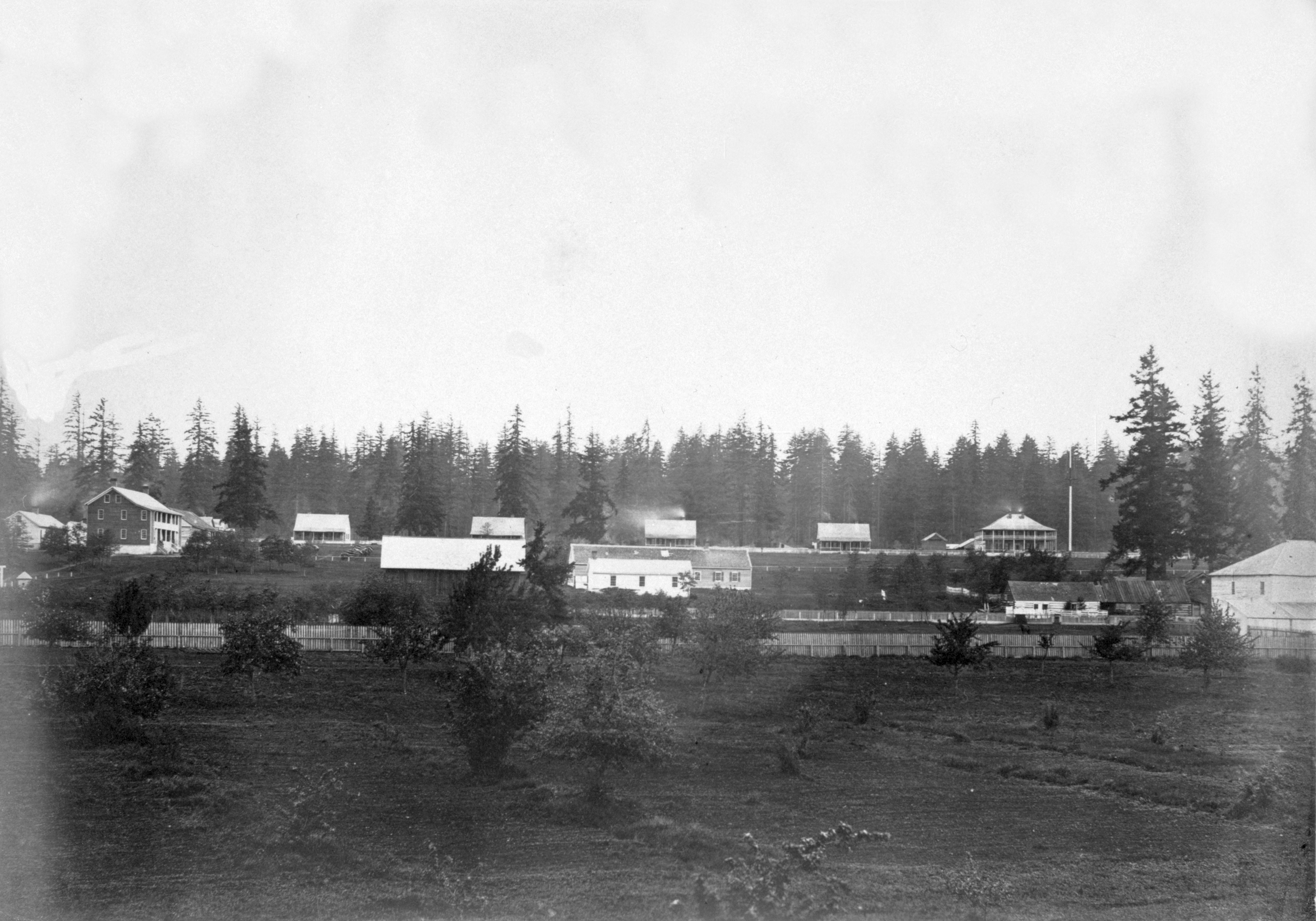
Fort Vancouver in 1859

The signing of the RAC-HBC Agreement with the Russian-American Company pushed the HBC into creating an agricultural subsidiary, the Pugets Sound Agricultural Company in 1840. Herds of sheep and cattle were purchased in Alta California and raised at Fort Nisqually. Agricultural products were sown and grown in abundance at Fort Cowlitz and exported with foodstuffs produced at Fort Vancouver to Russian America. Recruitment from retired HBC laborers residing in the Willamette Valley as agriculturalists, through the use of priests François Norbert Blanchet and Modeste Demers, utterly failed to convince any farmer to leave for vicinity of the Cowlitz farms. While additional plans called for recruitment in Scotland, these too came to nothing.

The only successful source of early colonists for the PSAC would come from the Red River colony. In November 1839, Sir George Simpson instructed Duncan Finlayson to begin promoting the PSAC to colonists. James Sinclair was later appointed by Finlayson to guide the settler families that signed the PSAC agreement to Fort Vancouver. They left Fort Garry (modern Winnipeg) in June 1841 with 121 people that consisted of 23 families. When they arrived at Fort Vancouver, they then numbered 21 families of 116 people. Fourteen of them were relocated to Fort Nisqually, while the remaining seven families were sent to Fort Cowlitz.

== Oregon Treaty ==
Signed in 1846, the Oregon Treaty set the Canada–United States border at the 49th parallel north, putting Fort Vancouver within American territory. Although the treaty ensured that the HBC could continue to operate and had free access to navigate the Strait of Juan de Fuca, Puget Sound, and the Columbia River, company operations were effectively stifled by the treaty and became unprofitable and were soon closed down.

== Restoration ==
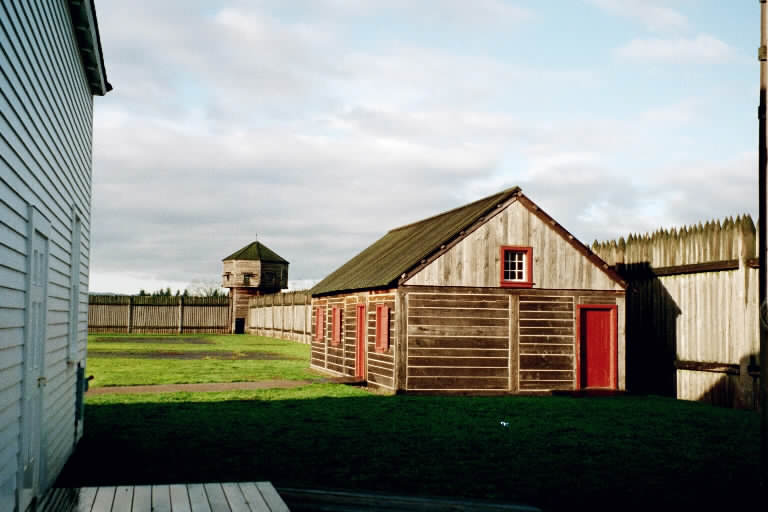
The modern reconstruction, showing the outer palisade and the single corner bastion.

Because of its significance in United States history a plan was put together to preserve the location. Fort Vancouver was declared a US National Monument on June 19, 1948, and redesignated as Fort Vancouver National Historic Site on June 30, 1961. This was taken a step further in 1996 when a 366-acre (1.48 km^{2}) area around the fort, including Kanaka Village, the Columbia Barracks and the bank of the river, was established as the Vancouver National Historic Reserve maintained by the National Park Service. It is possible to tour the fort. Notable buildings of the restored Fort Vancouver include a bake house, where hardtack baking techniques are shown, a blacksmith shop, a carpenter shop and its collection of carpentry tools, and the kitchen, where daily meals were prepared.

== See also ==
- Naukane (John Coxe)
- New Caledonia
- Vancouver National Historic Reserve Historic District

== Bibliography ==
- Blanchet, François Norbert; Demers, Modeste Demers; Bolduc, Jean-Baptiste-Zacharie; Langlois, Antoine (1956), Landerholm, Carl (ed.), Notices & Voyages of the Famed Quebec Mission to the Pacific Northwest, Portland, OR: Champoeg Press
- Franchère, Gabriel; Huntington, J. V. (1854), Narrative of a Voyage to the Northwest Coast of America 1811-1814., New York: Redfield, archived from the original on 2018-02-09
- Dunn, James (1844), History of the Oregon Territory and British North-American Fur Trade, London: Edwards and Hughes
- Galbraith, John S. (1954), "The Early History of the Puget's Sound Agricultural Company, 1838–43", Oregon Historical Quarterly, 55 (3), Oregon Historical Society: 234–259
- Galbraith, John S. (1957a), The Hudson's Bay Company as an Imperial Factor, 1821–1869, Toronto: University of Toronto Press
- Koppel, Tom (1995), McLean, Elizabeth (ed.), Kanaka: The Untold Story of Hawaiian Pioneers in British Columbia and the Pacific Northwest, Vancouver: Whitecap Books
- Mackie, Richard Somerset (1997), Trading Beyond the Mountains: The British Fur Trade on the Pacific 1793–1843, Vancouver: University of British Columbia Press, ISBN 0-7748-0613-3, OCLC 82135549, archived from the original on 2016-04-26
- Meany, Edmond S. (1914), "Three Diplomats Prominent in the Oregon Question", The Washington Historical Quarterly, 5 (3): 207–214, JSTOR 40474377
- Merk, Frederick (1950), "The Ghost River Caledonia in the Oregon Negotiation of 1818", The American Historical Review, 50 (3), Oxford: Oxford University Press: 530–551, doi:10.2307/1843497, JSTOR 1843497
- Miller, Hunter, ed. (1931), Treaties and Other International Acts of the United States of America, Treaties, etc, vol. 2, Washington, D.C.: United States Government Printing Office, archived from the original on 2016-12-27
- Watson, Bruce McIntyre (2010), Lives Lived West of the Divide: A Biographical Dictionary of Fur Traders Working West of the Rockies, 1793–1858, Kelowna, BC: University of British Columbia, ISBN 978-0-9810212-7-0
- Winter, Oscar Osburn (1967), "The British in Oregon Country: A Triptych View", The Pacific Northwest Quarterly, 58 (4), University of Washington: 179–187
