= Columbia District =

Former fur trading district of North America

Columbia
- Fur trading district
- Flag

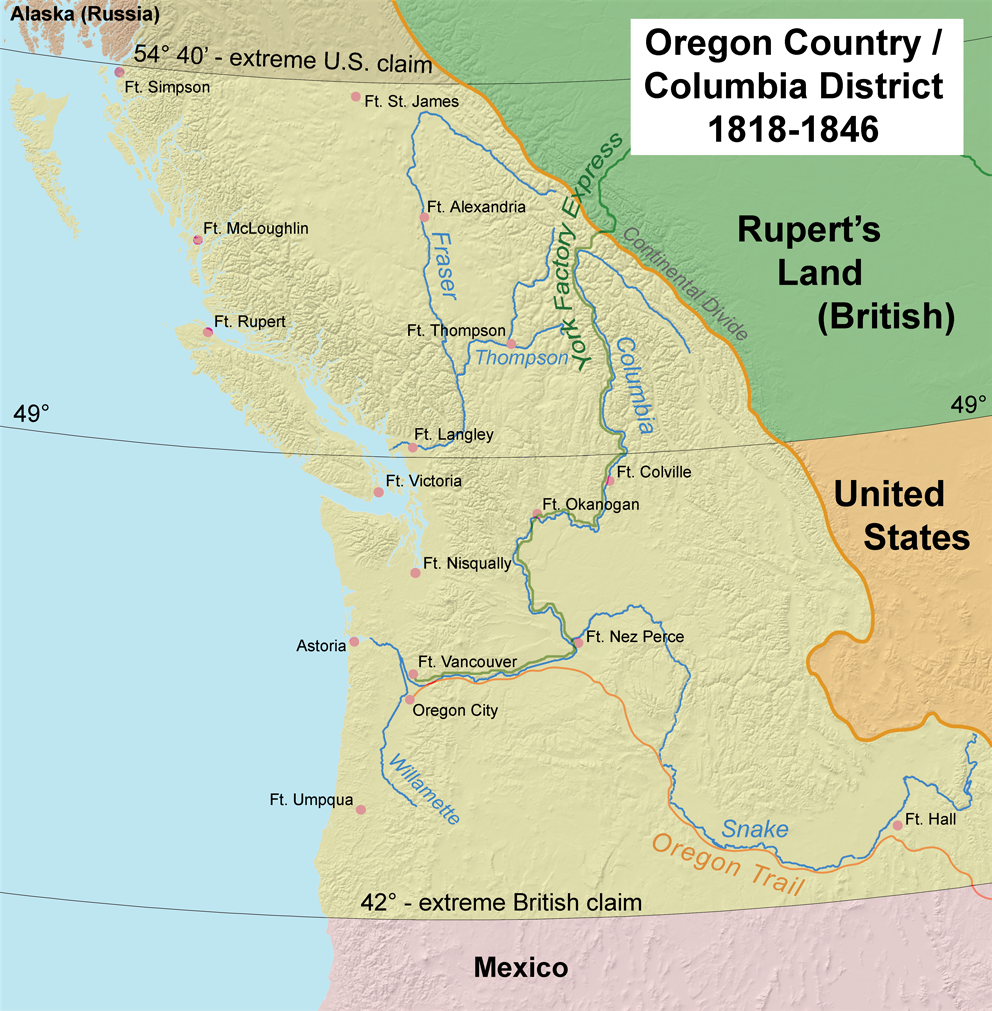
- Map of the Oregon Country "jointly occupied" by the United States and the United Kingdom; the Columbia Department at its greatest extent included areas far to the north and to the south.
- Country: British North America
- Established: 1810

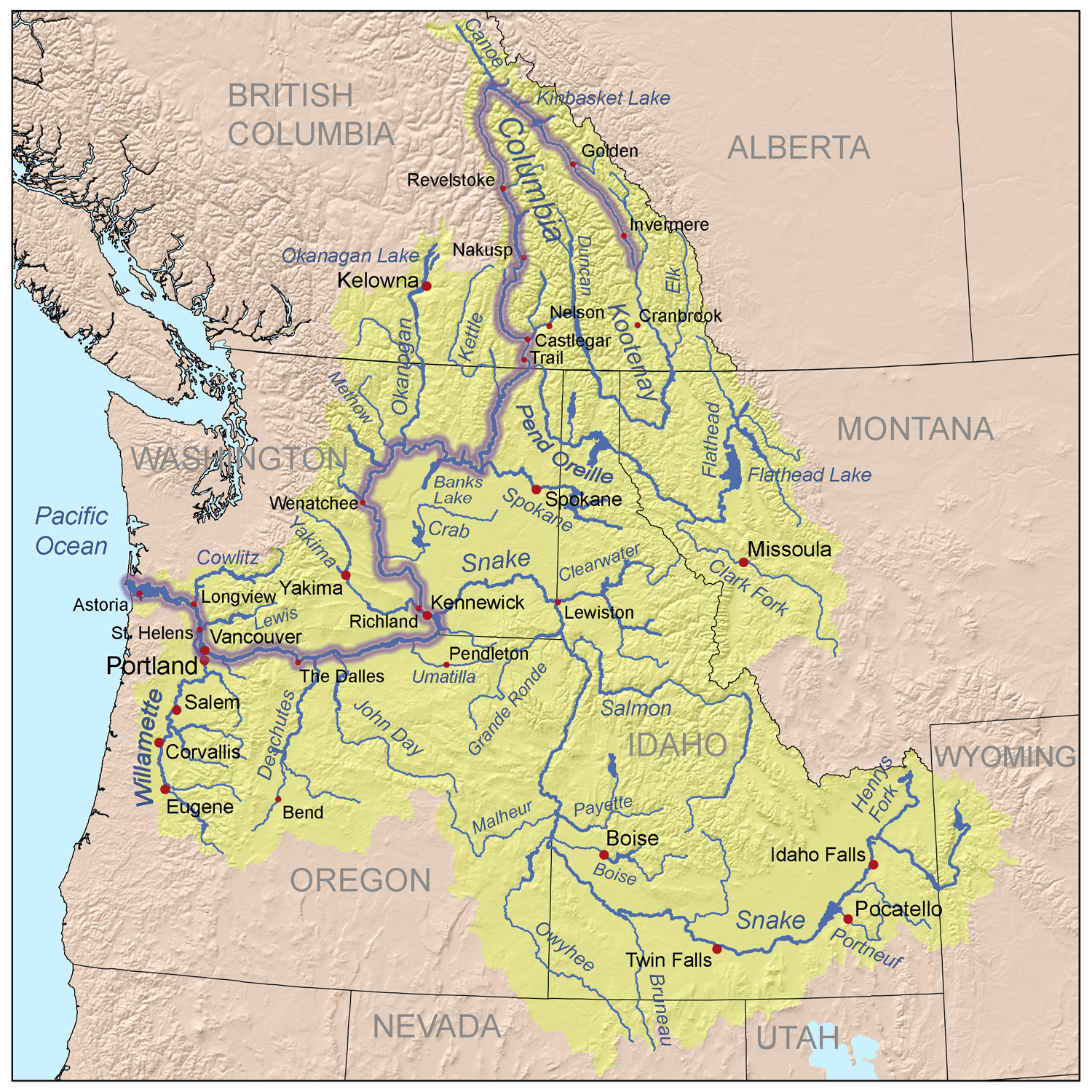
Map of the Columbia River and its tributaries showing modern political boundaries. In 1811 David Thompson was the first European to journey the entire length of the Columbia.

The Columbia District was a fur-trading district in the Pacific Northwest region of North America, in both the United States and British North America in the 19th century. Much of its territory overlapped with the temporarily jointly occupied and disputed Oregon Country. It was explored by the North West Company between 1793 and 1811 and established as an operating fur-trading district around 1810. The North West Company was absorbed into the Hudson's Bay Company (HBC) in 1821, under which the Columbia District became known as the Columbia Department. It was considered part of British North America and later became the brief first Colony of British Columbia (1858–1866) with the subsequent merger with the Colony of Vancouver Island (1849–1866) to form a larger second short-lived Colony of British Columbia (1866–1871). After protracted negotiations with British and Canadian authorities, the newly reorganized Province of British Columbia joined in 1871 with the new Canadian Confederation of 1867 further east, as the western-most province of a now trans-continental Canada. The Oregon Treaty of June 1846, signed in Washington, D.C., by the United States and the United Kingdom, marked the effective end of the old Hudson's Bay Company's jurisdiction of the former western Columbia District / Department on the Pacific coast, although the HBC continued a mercantile commercial business until 2025.

== Early years ==
Beginning in 1807, explorer, fur trader, surveyor / cartographer David Thompson, working for the North West Company (NWC), explored much of what would become the Columbia District (and later Department) / Oregon Country. In 1811 he located and mapped out the Athabasca Pass in the Canadian Rockies (the northern portion of the long Rocky Mountains chain in western North America), which became the key overland east — west connection to the emerging fur district.

== Pacific Fur Company (1810–1813) ==
The short-lived American Pacific Fur Company (PFC) of 1810–1813, founded Fort Astoria near the mouth of the long Columbia River waterway to the continental interior, and began to compete with and counter the older NWC trading posts. Funded by the German-American merchant John Jacob Astor, the PFC men had previously sailed around Cape Horn on board the Tonquin 1807 (2). During the War of 1812, the Pacific Northwest was a distant isolated region of the second British-American conflict. Prior to the war, both companies operated in the region in peaceable competition. News of a coming British warship put the American company in a difficult position. In October 1813, the PFC management met at Fort Astoria and agreed to sell its assets to the Montreal-based NWC, which renamed the post Fort George, in honor of the reigning British monarch, King George III of the United Kingdom. The Royal Navy warship HMS Raccoon arrived the following month, and found that the trading center they hoped to capture was already owned by British subjects.

== North West Company ==
In 1815 the North West Company's business west of the Canadian Rockies was officially divided into two districts, the older New Caledonia District in the northern interior, and the Columbia District to the south. Also in 1815 the New Caledonia district began receiving the bulk of its annual supplies by sea from the lower Columbia River rather than overland from Fort William and Montreal. By 1820 the North West Company operated six posts on the lower Columbia River and its tributaries, including Fort George (previously Fort Astoria of the Americans' Pacific Fur Company, Fort Nez Percés, Fort Okanogan, Spokane House, Flathead Post, and Kootanae House.

Under the North West Company the Columbia District was bounded, roughly, by the southern edge of the Thompson River on the north, and by the southern and eastern limits of the Columbia River basin. North and west of the Thompson was the New Caledonia fur district, in what is now north-central British Columbia. The Thompson River region was its own fur district, centered on a fur trading post that later became the city of Kamloops. The Thompson River District was the link between the Columbia and New Caledonia Districts.

In the Treaty of 1818 between the U.S. and Britain, the two powers agreed that each had free and open access to the Oregon Country. This "joint occupation" continued until the Oregon Treaty of 1846. American attempts to conduct commercial operations in the region failed in the face of competition by the Hudson's Bay Company. The only sphere in which the Americans temporarily dominated was the maritime fur trade along the coast. Even so, the HBC successfully took over the coastal maritime trade during the 1830s through various means, such as constructing trading forts.

The North West Company found the Native Americans of the Columbia region generally unwilling to work as fur trappers and hunters. The company depended upon native labor east of the Rocky Mountains and found it difficult to operate without assistance in the west. For this reason the company began, in 1815, to bring groups of Haudenosaunee, skilled at hunting and trapping, from the Montreal region to the Pacific Northwest. This practice soon became standard policy and was continued for many years by both the North West Company and the Hudson's Bay Company and was essential for the extension of the fur trade into much of the Columbia basin. The Haudenosaunee were intended not only to support company personnel but, it was hoped, teach local natives the skills of hunting and trapping, and convince them to take up the work. This effort was largely unsuccessful. The reason generally given for the unwillingness of the natives to take up trapping and hunting was that their way of life was highly focused on salmon and fishing, and that the abundance of salmon resulted in little incentive for taking up hunting and trapping. Instead of cooperation there were altercations between the Haudenosaunee and local natives. In 1816 parties of the North West Company, including a number of Haudenosaunee, explored the Cowlitz River valley and the Willamette Valley, reaching as far south as the Umpqua River. Both exploring expeditions ended with violent clashes between the Haudenosaunee and local natives. In addition the North West Company began to hire Native Hawaiians, known as Kanakas. This practice was continued and greatly expanded by the Hudson's Bay Company.

The North West Company was unchallenged in the fur trade of the region from 1813 to 1821, when it was merged with the Hudson's Bay Company. During this period the company put into practice the system attempted by the Astorians' Pacific Fur Company. A supply ship arrived each spring at Fort George (Astoria). Fur brigades from the interior of the Columbia and New Caledonia districts would converge on Fort George each spring. Furs were loaded on the ship and supplies carried back to the interior. The ship would then carry the furs to Canton, China, where furs would be exchanged for tea and other goods, which were then carried to Britain, completing a global circuit. Company letters, reports, and personnel were generally conveyed overland along a route between Fort George and Fort William on Lake Superior, making use of Athabasca Pass. Later, under the Hudson's Bay Company, the York Factory Express used this route, reoriented to York Factory on Hudson Bay.

The Columbia District under the North West Company was only marginally profitable at best. There were numerous problems at many posts. The only consistently profitable areas were the Kootenay River and Snake River countries. New Caledonia produced many furs, but its remoteness made it costly to operate. Nevertheless, the North West Company succeeded in creating a functional network oriented to the Pacific via the Columbia River. Another important legacy was the construction of Fort Nez Percés on the Columbia River near its confluence with the Snake River. Fort Nez Percés would long remain a strategic site, located at the junction of a variety of trails leading to vastly different regions. The fort became an important center for the procurement of horses, a base for expeditions far to the southeast, and a focal point for fur brigades preparing to journey through the Columbia River Gorge. The shipping of furs to Canton, China, was a financial failure for the North West Company, in part due to the East India Company's monopoly on British trade in the Far East.

== Hudson's Bay Company ==
The North West Company was merged with the Hudson's Bay Company in 1821. Operations west of the Rocky Mountains were reorganized and the fur districts of New Caledonia and Columbia were merged in 1827 under the name Columbia Department. The name New Caledonia continued to be used for the old northern district, and in time came to be used for areas such as the Fraser Canyon and the Lower Mainland.

In the winter of 1824-25 the Hudson's Bay Company built Fort Vancouver on the lower Columbia River to serve as the headquarters of the entire Columbia Department. Fort George was then closed, only to be reopened in 1829 as a subsidiary to Fort Vancouver.

The Hudson's Bay Company York Factory Express, overland route to Fort Vancouver, evolved from an earlier express brigade used by the North West Company between Fort Astoria to Fort William on Lake Superior. By 1825 there were usually two brigades, each setting out in spring from opposite ends of the route, Fort Vancouver, and York Factory on Hudson Bay, and passing each other in the middle of the continent. Each brigade consisted of about forty to seventy-five men and two to five Columbia boat west of the Rockies and York boats on the eastern side, traveling at breakneck speed (for the time). Indians along the way were often paid in trade goods to help them portage around falls and unnavigable rapids. An 1839 report cites the travel time as three months and ten days—almost 26 miles (40 km) per day on average. This established a 'quick' (about 100 days for 2,600 miles (4,200 km)) way to transmit reports, requisitions, and correspondence between Fort Vancouver and York Factory on Hudson Bay.

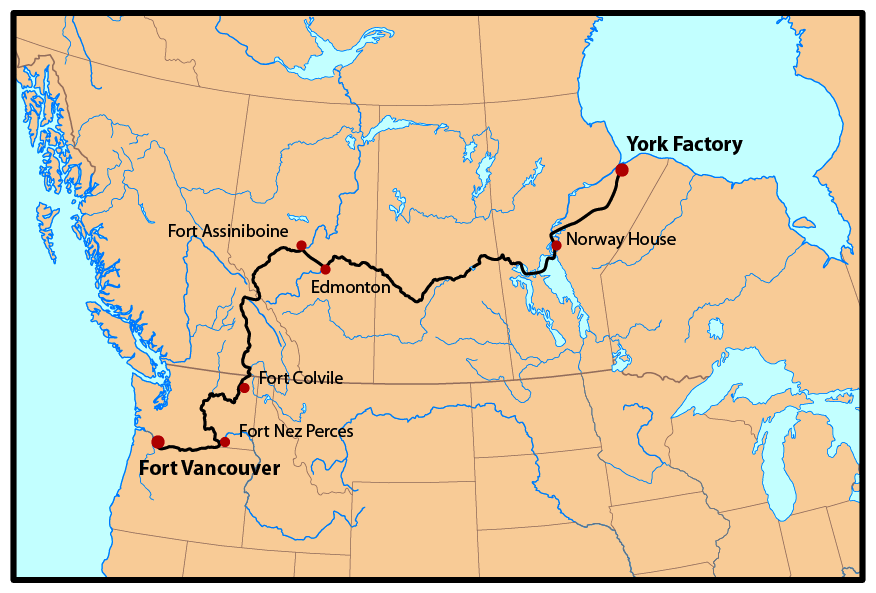
Map of the route of the York Factory Express, 1820s to 1840s, with modern political boundaries shown

The supplies were brought into Fort Vancouver by ship every year (they tried to maintain one year’s extra supplies in reserve, to insure against disastrous ship wrecks etc.). The furs acquired through trade and trapping were shipped to England on the supply ships’ return trip. Together with furs from York factory, they were sold in London in an annual fur sale. The brigades carried supplies in and furs out by Columbia boat and pack horse to and from the forts and trading posts along the route. They also carried status reports, requisitions for supplies needed, furs traded etc. from Chief Factor Dr. John McLoughlin, superintendent of the Columbia District HBC operations, and the other fort managers along the route. This system continued until 1846.

Between its merger with the North West Company in 1821 and the Oregon Treaty of 1846, the HBC greatly expanded the operations of the Columbia Department. The fur trade was extended to essentially every major river from the Yukon River in the north to the mouth of the Colorado River in the south, and east to the headwaters of the Missouri River tributaries. American fur trade competition was effectively blocked through various strategies, including selectively overhunting frontier regions to create "fur deserts", and the construction of forts on the Pacific Northwest coast to intercept furs before American ships could acquire them.

The HBC also diversified its economic activity, incorporating the Puget Sound Agricultural Company to promote settlement. It began exporting agricultural foodstuffs, salmon, lumber, and other products. Russian Alaska, Hawaii, and Mexican California were developed as markets for these exports. The HBC opened agencies in Sitka, Honolulu, and Yerba Buena (San Francisco) to facilitate the trade.

Fort Vancouver was the nexus for the fur trade on the Pacific Coast; its influence reached from the Rocky Mountains to the Hawaiian Islands, and from Alaska into Mexican-controlled California. At its pinnacle, Fort Vancouver watched over 34 outposts, 24 ports, six ships, and 600 employees. The employment of Hawaiian Kanakas was gradually expanded until at least 207 in the Columbia Department by 1845, with 119 located at Fort Vancouver. Also, for many settlers the fort became the last stop on the Oregon Trail as they could get supplies before starting their homestead.

By 1843 the Hudson's Bay Company operated numerous posts in the Columbia Department, including Fort Vancouver, Fort George (Astoria), Fort Nisqually, Fort Umpqua, Fort Langley, Fort Colvile, Fort Okanogan, Fort Kamloops, Fort Alexandria, Flathead Post, Kootanae House, Fort Boise, Fort Hall, Fort Simpson, Fort Taku, Fort McLoughlin (in Milbanke Sound), Fort Stikine, as well as a number of others.

Increasing numbers of American settlers arriving on the Oregon Trail gave rise to the Oregon boundary dispute.

With the signing of the Oregon Treaty in 1846 the U.S.-British boundary was extended west from the Continental Divide, as a straight-line along the 49th parallel. This ignored the geography of the mountainous terrain west of the Rocky Mountains. The new boundary, climbed and decended peaks and traversed rivers, lakes and canyons; rather than following natural topography. The treaty effectively destroyed the geographical logic of the HBC's Columbia Department. The lower Columbia River was the heart, core and lifeline of that system.

The U.S. soon organized its portion as the Oregon Territory. The administrative headquarters of fur operations, and of the Columbia Department, then shifted to Fort Victoria, which had been founded by James Douglas in 1843 as a fallback position in preparation for the "worst case" scenario settlement of the dispute.

By 1846, the Columbia District had been more than halved and the name had fallen into relative disuse, until revived when the new Mainland Colony needed a name. The uncharted territory of the remainder of the Columbia District, including the remainder of the British coast north of Puget Sound, as far north as at least Queen Charlotte Strait (Fort Simpson and Fort McLoughlin were administered from Fort St. James, the headquarters of New Caledonia). After 1846 New Caledonia informally referred to the Fraser Canyon Gold Rush region in 1848 and farther north the Cariboo Gold Rush area during the 1860s.

With the creation of the Crown Colony on the British mainland north of the then-Washington Territory in 1858, Queen Victoria chose to use Columbia District as the basis for the name Colony of British Columbia, i.e. the remaining British portion of the former Columbia District.

In their British Columbia Chronicle, historians Helen B. Akrigg and G.P.V. Akrigg coined the term "Southern Columbia" for the "lost" area south of the 49th Parallel, but this has never come into common use, even by other historians.

== Historical figures ==
- Samuel Black
- Comcomly
- Chief Lolo
- John McLoughlin
- Chief Nicola (Hwistesmetxe'qen)
- Peter Skene Ogden
- Alexander Ross
- Chief Seattle (Sealth)
- Sir George Simpson
- James Sinclair
- David Thompson

== See also ==
- Former colonies and territories in Canada
- Territorial evolution of Canada after 1867
- Columbia Country
- History of British Columbia
- History of Oregon
- Rupert's Land
- Pig War

== Sources ==
- Franchère, Gabriel (1969) [1854], Lamb, William (ed.), Journal of a Voyage on the North West Coast of North America during the Years 1811, 1812, 1813 and 1814, Toronto, Ontario: Champlain Society Publications, doi:10.3138/9781442618039, ISBN 978-1-4426-1803-9, OCLC 655880167
- Koppel, Tom (1995), McLean, Elizabeth (ed.), Kanaka: The Untold Story of Hawaiian Pioneers in British Columbia and the Pacific Northwest, Vancouver, B.C.: Whitecap Books, ISBN 978-1-55110-295-5, OCLC 31777714
- Mackie, Richard Somerset (1997), Trading Beyond the Mountains: The British Fur Trade on the Pacific 1793–1843, Vancouver, B.C.: University of British Columbia Press, ISBN 978-0-7748-0559-9, OCLC 180704193
- Meinig, Donald W. (2016) [1968], The Great Columbia Plain, Seattle: University of Washington Press, ISBN 978-0-295-80519-1, JSTOR j.ctvct01r6, OCLC 1052568178 Partial preview at Google Books.
