= York Factory Express =

19th-century fur trading convoy route

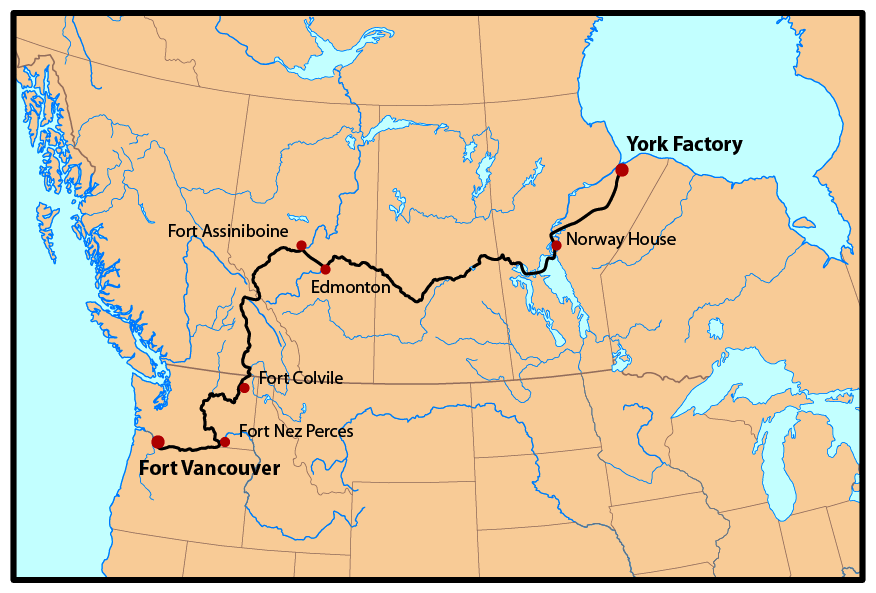
Map of the route of the York Factory Express, 1820s to 1840s. Modern political boundaries shown.

The York Factory Express, usually called "the Express" and also the Columbia Express and the Communication, was a 19th-century fur brigade operated by the Hudson's Bay Company (HBC). Roughly 4,200 kilometres (2,600 mi) in length, it was the main overland connection between HBC headquarters at York Factory and the principal depot of the Columbia Department, Fort Vancouver.

It was named "express" because it was not used to transport furs and supplies, but to quickly move departmental requisitions, reports, and correspondence, as well as personnel—new hires inland, retirees outbound, and Company officers being transferred or going on furlough. The express brigade was known as the York Factory Express on its eastbound journey in the spring, and as the Columbia Express or Autumn Express on its westbound journey in the fall back on the same route.

Supplies and trade goods for the Columbia District were brought from Britain to Fort Vancouver every year by ship around South America, not overland via the York Factory Express route. Management at Fort Vancouver tried to maintain one year's extra supplies on hand in case a shipment might be lost at sea or attempting to cross the bar at the mouth of the Columbia River. The furs acquired by trading and trapping during the previous year were sent back on the supply ships and sold in London in an annual fur sale.

== History ==
=== NWC ===
The York Factory Express evolved from an earlier route used by the Montreal-based North West Company (NWC). During the War of 1812 the NWC and their American competitors, the Pacific Fur Company (PFC), struggled commercially over the Columbia River basin. At the mouth of the Columbia was the principal station of the PFC, Fort Astoria, established in 1811 and named after its principal owner, John Jacob Astor. Although it was under threat of confiscation by the British during the War of 1812, the PFC was peaceably liquidated in 1813, when Fort Astoria and its stock in trade were sold to the NWC, and several of its employees also joined the NWC. Renaming Fort Astoria as Fort George, the NWC developed an overland supply route from there to its inland depot at Fort William on Lake Superior. In the ensuing years, the NWC continued to expand its operations in the Pacific Northwest. Skirmishes with its major competitor, the Hudson's Bay Company (HBC), had already flared into the Pemmican War. The conflict ended in 1821 when the British Government pressured the NWC to merge with the HBC.

=== HBC ===
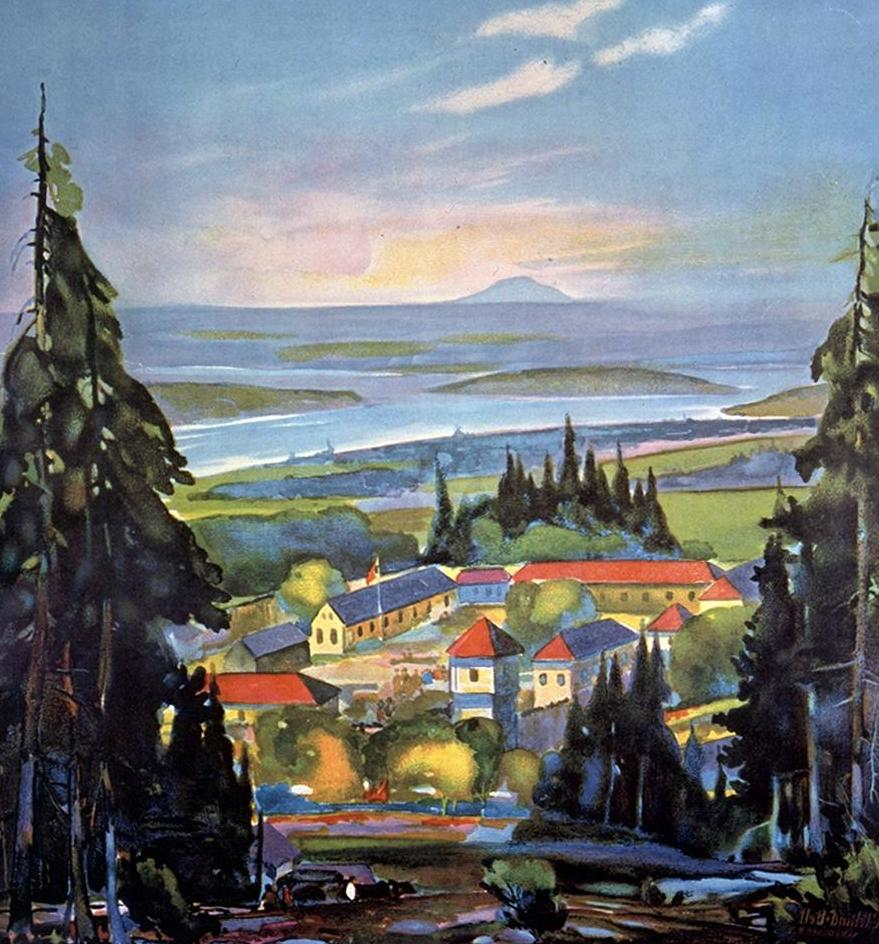
Fort Vancouver, on the Columbia River (river mile 106) near the mouth of the Willamette River, in 1825.

George Simpson, the Governor of Hudson's Bay Company, visited the Columbia District in 1824–25, journeying from York Factory. With the help of John Rowand, the Chief Factor in charge at Fort Edmonton, George Simpson investigated a quicker route than previously used, following the Saskatchewan River and crossing the mountains at Athabasca Pass. This route was well known by many Northwesters, but after the merger they refused to share knowledge of it with the HBC. It was not until John Rowand beat George Simpson to Fort Assiniboine by nearly a month and Simpson threatened to shut down Fort Edmonton that Rowand let Simpson know about this route. This route was thereafter followed by the York Factory Express brigades.

James Sinclair was appointed in 1841 by Duncan Finlayson to guide over twenty settler families from the Red River Colony to the Pacific Northwest. He pioneered a more southerly route through Sinclair Pass. Upon arriving at Fort Vancouver, fourteen of them were relocated to Fort Nisqually, while the remaining seven families were sent to Fort Cowlitz. Despite this, arrangements with the Puget Sound Agricultural Company, an HBC subsidiary, proved to be unsatisfactory for the British settlers, who all gradually moved to the Willamette Valley favoured by American settlers.

== Brigades ==
By 1825 there were usually two brigades, each setting out from opposite ends of the route, Fort Vancouver on the lower Columbia River and the other from York Factory on Hudson Bay. The brigade typically left Fort Vancouver in late March, heading east. The annual ship from Britain arrived at York Factory typically the first week in August, with the express brigade leaving for the west by the second week in August. York Factory would be in a turmoil unpacking and repacking trade goods, mail, and special orders to send out to Hudson Bay posts along the express route. Mail and furs from Red River, the Mackenzie and Columbia River Brigades then needed to be loaded on the ship returning to Britain by the second or third week of September.

Each brigade consisted of about 40 to 75 men and two to five specially made boats and travelled at breakneck speed. Indians along the way were often paid in trade goods to help them portage around falls and navigable rapids. An 1839 report cites the travel time as three months and ten days—almost 42 km (26 mi) per day on average. These boats carried newly hired employees west and retiring personnel east. They also carried status reports, lists of furs collected through trading and trapping, and orders for supplies from Chief Factor Dr. John McLoughlin, superintendent of Columbia Department operations, and the other fort managers along the route. This continued until 1846 when the Oregon Treaty was signed with the United States. Lands south of the 49th parallel north were in this partition of the Pacific Northwest awarded to the United States. This placed Fort Vancouver and several other important HBC stations within American territory. Columbia District headquarters was shifted to Fort Victoria on Vancouver Island.

== Transport ==
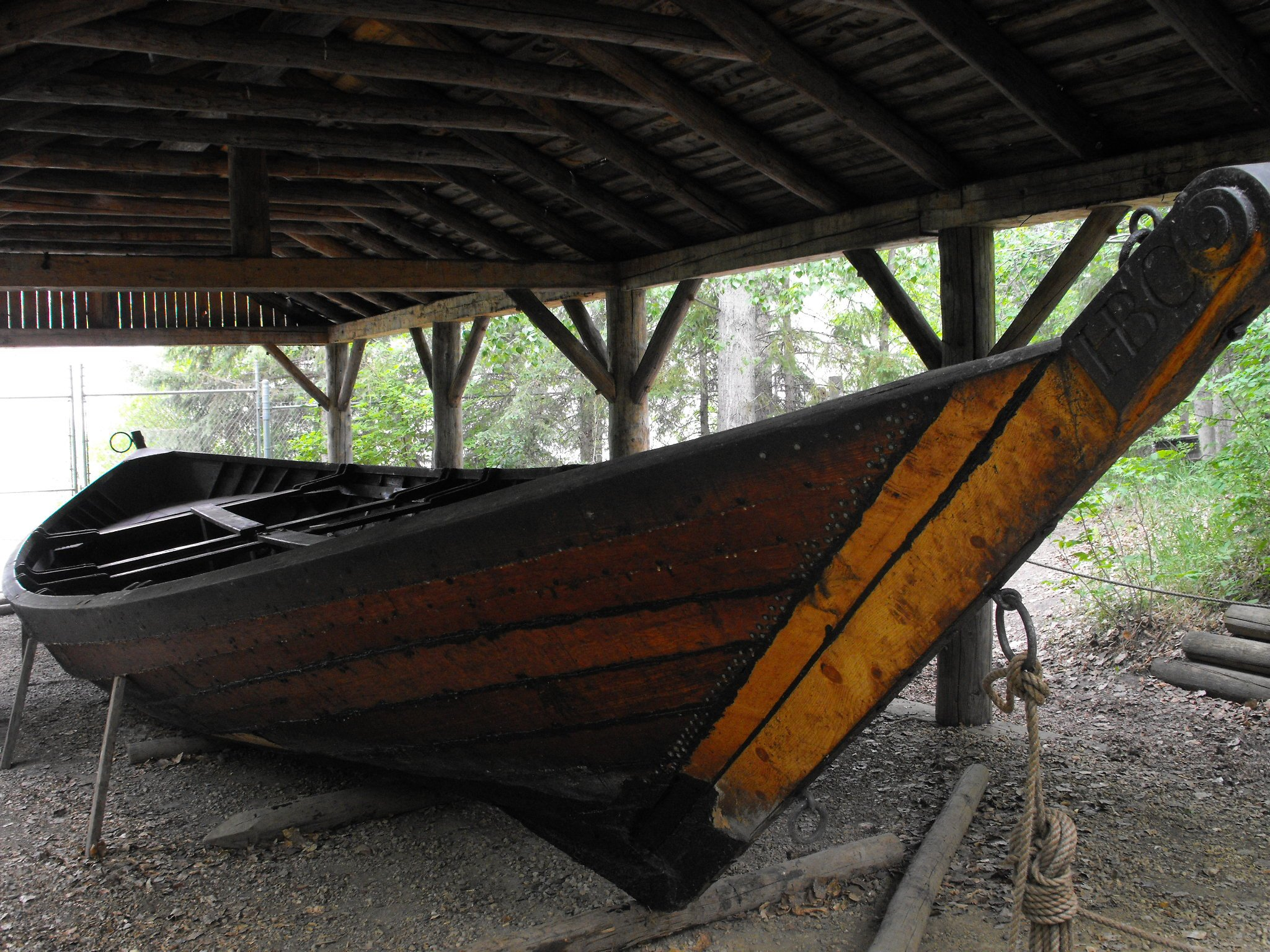
York boat replica at Fort Edmonton Park, Edmonton, Alberta

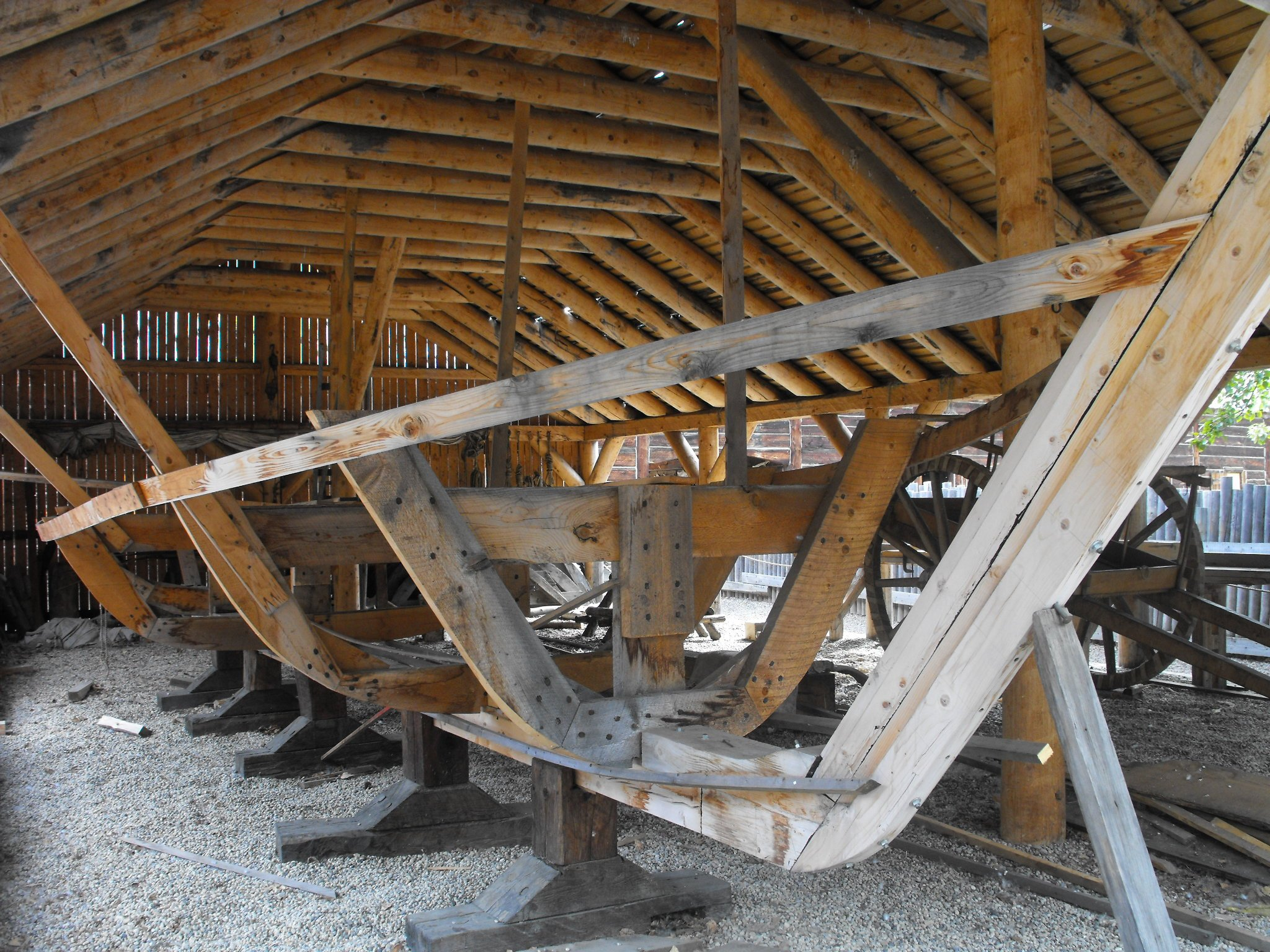
York boat under construction showing use of heavy materials.

An inland boat, the York boat, was used to carry furs and trade goods along inland waterways in Rupert's Land east of the Rocky Mountains. The express brigades also used these boats, although they did not carry bulk cargo. The boats were named after their destination: York Factory, headquarters of the HBC, and may have been modeled after Orkney Islands fishing boats (themselves a descendant of the Viking long boat). The York boat was preferable to the canoes used by North West Company voyageurs as a cargo carrier, because of its larger size, greater capacity, and improved stability in rough water. The boat's heavy wood construction also gave it an advantage in travelling through rocks or ice; it was more resistant to tears and punctures. That advantage became a disadvantage, though, when portaging was necessary. The boat was far too heavy to carry, and it was necessary instead to cut a path through the brush, lay poplar rollers, and laboriously drag the boat overland.

West of the Rocky Mountains the rivers were obstructed by falls and rapids, so boats had to be light enough to carry on portages. In 1811 David Thompson of the North West Company introduced the use of canoes on the Columbia River, made of split or sawn cedar planks. The NWC and the HBC continued the practice of using canoe-like wooden-plank boats, as good birch bark was in short supply west of the Rockies. Called Columbia boats, they were specifically developed for use in the Columbia District and constructed on the Columbia River, especially at Fort Colvile, because cedar was available in that area. In the 1840s, John Dunn, a former HBC employee described the Columbia boat as "made from quarter-inch pine board, and are thirty-two feet long, and six and a half feet wide in midships, with both ends sharp, and without a keel—worked, according to the circumstances of the navigation, with paddles, or with oars."

== Route ==
From Fort Vancouver in the west, the express route ran up the Columbia River past the posts of Fort Nez Perces, Fort Okanogan, and Fort Colvile to Boat Encampment (today under Kinbasket Lake). It then followed the Wood River and its tributary Pacific Creek to the Committee's Punch Bowl at the summit of Athabasca Pass. The route then travelled down the Whirlpool River and the Athabasca River to Jasper House and Fort Assiniboine, then overland 130 km (80 mi) to Fort Edmonton. (In 1848, the western end of the portage shifted to Athabasca Landing and used the Athabasca Landing Trail). From there, it continued down the North Saskatchewan River and Saskatchewan River to Lake Winnipeg and via Norway House on the Nelson River. The brigade would then travel down the Hayes River to York Factory on Hudson Bay.

== Bibliography ==
- Allen, W.P.G. (1972). Trail Through the Pembina Valley, 1790-1912. Alberta, Canada – via University of Calgary.
- Anderson, Nancy Marguerite (2020), The York Factory Express: Fort Vancouver to Hudson Bay, 1826-1849, Vancouver, BC: The Ronsdale Press, ISBN 978-1-55380-578-6
- Angel, Barbara; Angel, Michael (1981), Letitia Hargrave and Life in the Fur Trade, Agincourt, ON: Book Society of Canada, OCLC 8699692
- Dunn, John (1844), History of the Oregon Territory and British North-America Fur Trade, London: Edwards and Hughes
- Galbraith, John S. (1954), "The Early History of the Puget's Sound Agricultural Company, 1838-43", Oregon Historical Quarterly, 55 (3), Portland, OR: Oregon Historical Society: 234–259
- Lass, William E. (1980), Minnesota's boundary with Canada: its evolution since 1783, Minnesota Historical Society, p. 72, ISBN 978-0-87351-153-7
- Mackie, Richard Somerset (1997), Trading Beyond the Mountains: The British Fur Trade on the Pacific 1793–1843, Vancouver: University of British Columbia Press, ISBN 0-7748-0613-3, OCLC 82135549
- Meinig, D.W. (1995) [1968], The Great Columbia Plain: a historical geography, 1805-1910 (Weyerhaeuser Environmental Classic ed.), Seattle: University of Washington Press, ISBN 978-0-295-97485-9, OCLC 32968510
