= Mount Ross Cox =

Mountain in Alberta and British Columbia, Canada

- Location within Alberta Location within British Columbia Location within Canada

Highest point
- Elevation: 3,000 m (9,800 ft)
- Prominence: 354 m (1,161 ft)
- Parent peak: Mount Scott (3300 m)
- Listing: Mountains of Alberta; Mountains of British Columbia
- Coordinates: 52°27′31″N 118°01′05″W

Geography
- Country: Canada
- Provinces: Alberta and British Columbia
- District: Kootenay Land District
- Protected areas: Jasper National Park; Hamber Provincial Park
- Parent range: Park Ranges
- Topo map: NTS 83D8 Athabasca Pass

Climbing
- First ascent: 1972 Bob Kruszyna, Harriet Kruszyna

Mount Ross Cox is located north of the Hooker Icefield in Hamber Provincial Park and straddles the Continental Divide marking the Alberta-British Columbia border. It was named in 1920 after Ross Cox who traveled the area in 1817.

== See also ==
- List of peaks on the Alberta–British Columbia border
