= New Caledonia (Canada) =

Fur-trading district in present-day British Columbia, Canada (1805–1858)

- District of Hudson's Bay Company
- 1805–1858
- Flag

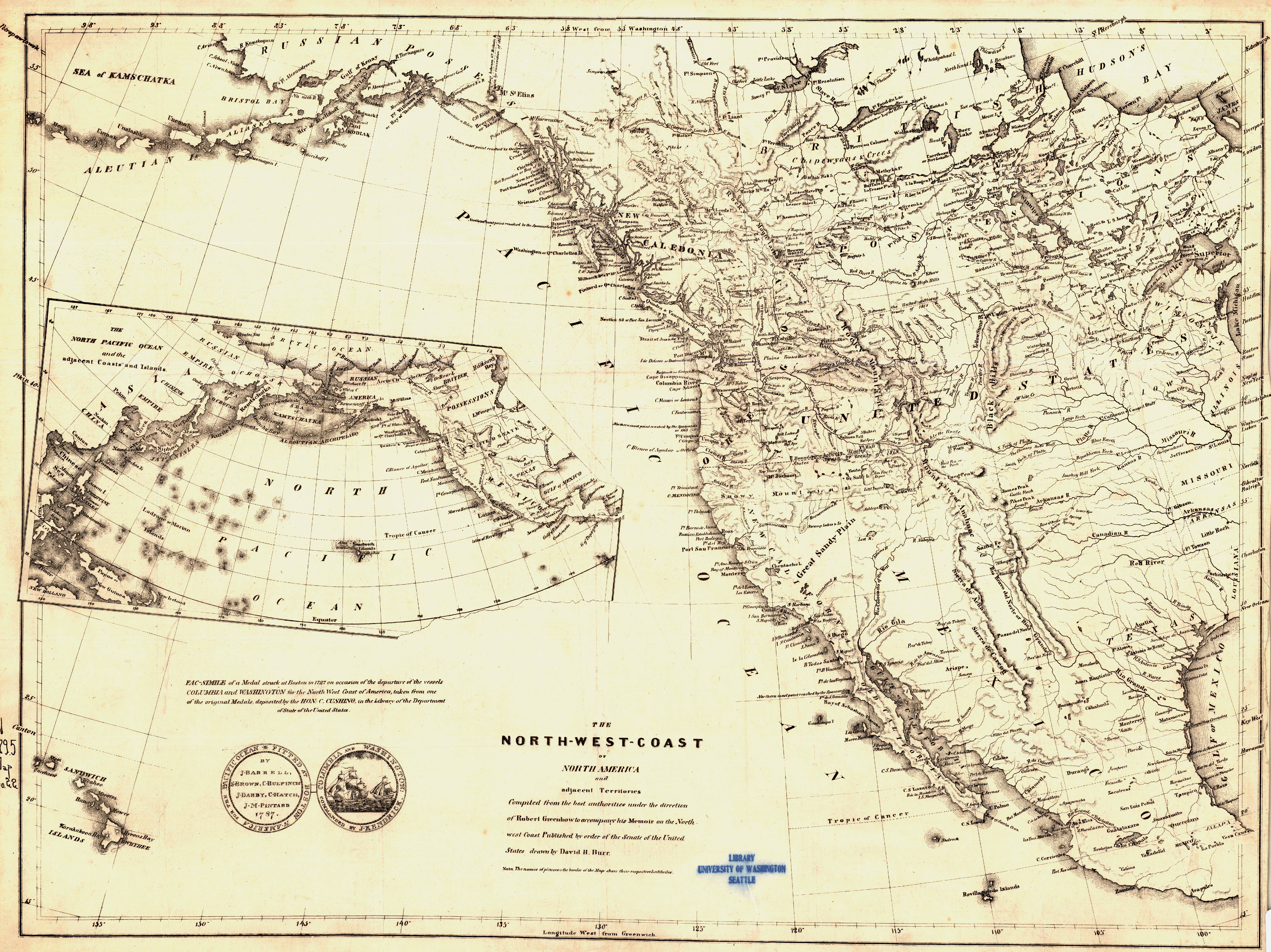
- Capital: Fort St. James
- Historical era: Maritime fur trade
  - Established: 1805
  - Disestablished: 1858
Succeeded by
Colony of Vancouver Island; Colony of British Columbia (1858–1866)
- Today part of: British Columbia, Canada

New Caledonia was a fur-trading district of the Hudson's Bay Company that comprised the territory of the north-central portions of present-day British Columbia, Canada. Though not a British colony, New Caledonia was part of the British claim to North America. Its administrative centre was Fort St. James. The rest of what is now mainland British Columbia was called the Columbia Department by the British, and the Oregon Country by the Americans. Even before the partition of the Columbia Department by the Oregon Treaty in 1846, New Caledonia was often used to describe anywhere on the mainland not in the Columbia Department, such as Fort Langley in the Fraser Valley.

== Fur-trading district ==
The explorations of James Cook and George Vancouver, and the concessions of Spain in 1792 established the British claim to the coast north of California. Similarly, British claims were established inland via the explorations of such men as Sir Alexander Mackenzie, Simon Fraser, Samuel Black, David Thompson, and John Finlay, and by the subsequent establishment of fur trading posts by the North West Company and the Hudson's Bay Company (HBC). However, until 1849, the region which now comprises British Columbia was an unorganized area of British North America. Unlike Rupert's Land to the north and east, the departments of New Caledonia and its southern neighbour, Columbia, were not concessions to HBC. Rather, the company was simply granted a monopoly to trade with the First Nations inhabitants after its merger with the North West Company in 1821.

For all intents and purposes, New Caledonia came into being with the establishment of the first British fur trading posts west of the Rocky Mountains by Simon Fraser and his crew, during their explorations of 1805–08. These were Fort George (later Prince George) at the junction of the Fraser and Nechako rivers, Fort Fraser on Fraser Lake, Hudson's Hope, near the Peace River Canyon, Fort McLeod on McLeod Lake, north of Fort George, and the administrative headquarters of the district, Fort St. James, on the shore of Stuart Lake. In its proper sense, New Caledonia at first thus comprised the territory of the northwestern Interior Plateau drained by the Peace, Stuart and Bulkley river systems. The origin of the name is generally attributed to Simon Fraser and his companions, to whom the hills and woodlands were reminiscent of the Scottish Highlands.

== Shifting boundaries and designations ==
The boundaries of the department were vague, and changed over time. For all practical purposes, New Caledonia extended as far as the economic relationships enjoyed by its designated trading posts, which greatly expanded over the years. The eastern boundary had been considered to be the Rocky Mountains, the northern boundary the Finlay River, and the southern boundary the Cariboo or the Thompson River drainage. The region south of the Thompson River and north of the then Mexico border, the 42nd parallel north, was designated as the Columbia District. The Columbia Department was governed first from Fort Astoria, then from Fort Vancouver (present day Vancouver, Washington). Westward migration of American settlers by the Oregon Trail led to the Oregon boundary dispute. The signing of the Oregon Treaty in 1846 ended disputed joint occupation of areas west of the Rocky Mountains pursuant to the Treaty of 1818. The southern boundary of the district was shifted north to the 49th parallel, and administration shifted to Fort Victoria. Nonetheless, in popular parlance, the entire British-held mainland north of the US boundary and west of the Rockies was known as New Caledonia.

In 1849, Vancouver Island and the Gulf Islands in the Strait of Georgia were designated a crown colony in their own right, the Colony of Vancouver Island.

== From New Caledonia to British Columbia ==
New Caledonia continued over the next few years to be administered by the HBC, whose regional chief executive, James Douglas, also happened to be governor of Vancouver Island. This situation was manageable, so long as the European population remained small (about 100, mostly Company employees and their families). All this changed in 1858, however, with the discovery of gold north of Yale, prompting the Fraser Canyon Gold Rush and the influx of twenty to thirty thousand people, mostly American. Douglas, who had no legal authority over the region, felt compelled to exert British sovereignty by placing a gunboat at the mouth of the Fraser River in order to obtain licence fees from prospectors seeking to travel upstream. The British colonial office was prompted into action, and legislation was passed designating New Caledonia a crown colony on August 2, 1858. The name given the new entity was the Colony of British Columbia, and a new capital, New Westminster, was established on the southern reaches of the Fraser River.

The name New Caledonia is still used in official and commercial names in the region (e.g., the College of New Caledonia and the Diocese of Caledonia in Prince George; Caledonia Sr. Secondary School in Terrace).

== See also ==
- Caledonia
- Columbia (Oregon Country)
- Columbia District, 1810–1846
- Former colonies and territories in Canada
- Oregon Country
- Roman Catholic Diocese of Victoria in Canada
- Stickeen Territories
- Territorial evolution of Canada after 1867
- Washington Territory
