= York boat =

Large, wide, all-wood cargo boat used in Canada

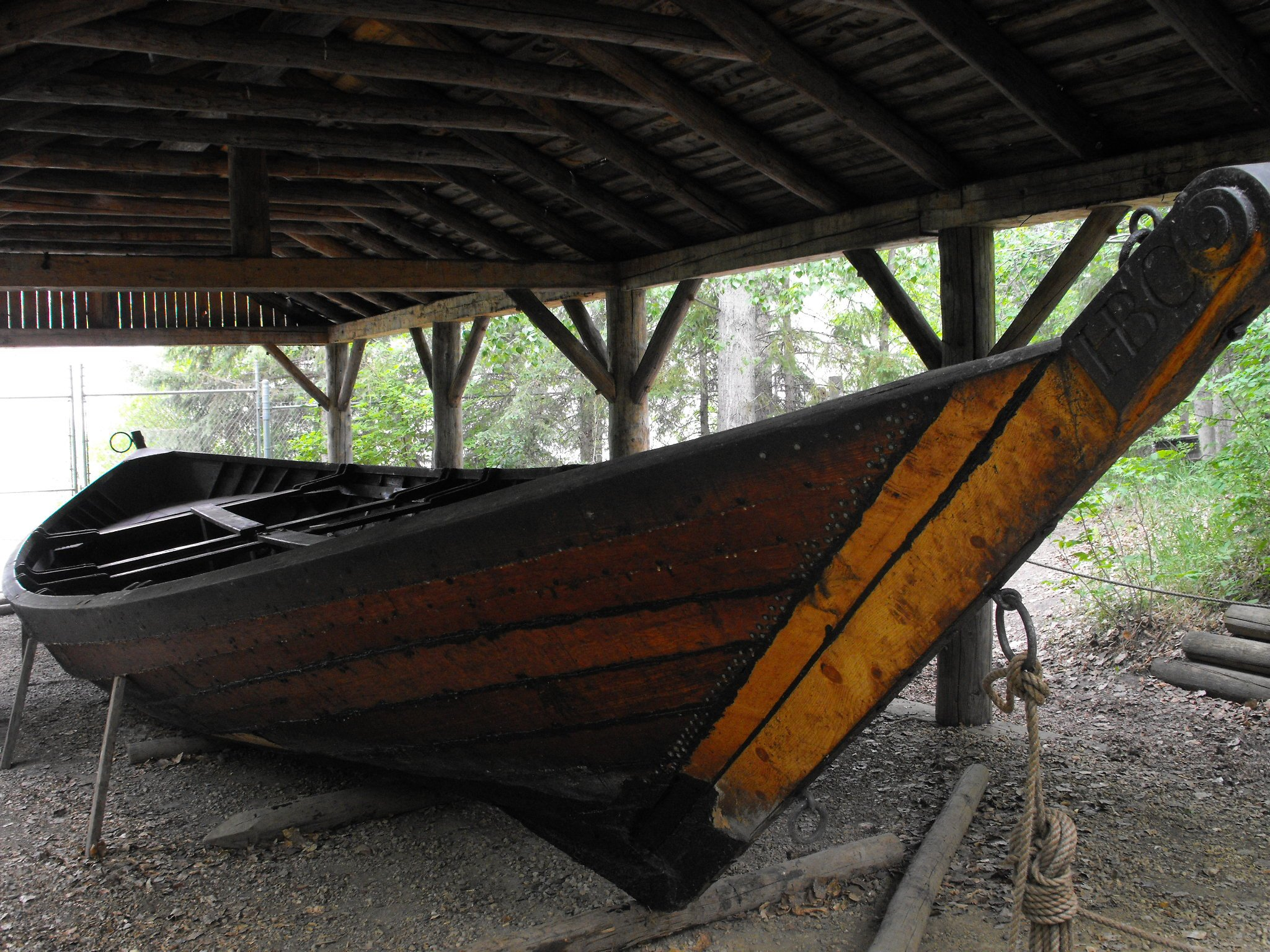
York boat replica at Fort Edmonton Park, Edmonton, Alberta

The York boat was a type of inland boat used by the Hudson's Bay Company to carry furs and trade goods along inland waterways in Rupert's Land, the watershed stretching from Hudson Bay to the eastern slopes of the Rocky Mountains. It was named after York Factory, the headquarters of the HBC, and by some accounts was supposedly modeled after the Orkney yole (itself a descendant of the Viking longship). Two variations to the York Boat were scows and "Sturgeon Heads."

== History and economics ==
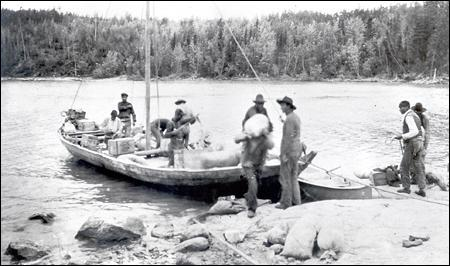
A York boat in use in 1910

York boats were preferred as cargo carriers to the birchbark canoes used by the North West Company, because they were larger, carried more cargo and were safer in rough water. The boat's heavy wood construction was a significant advantage when travelling waterways where the bottom or sides of the hull were likely to strike rocks or ice. Canoes then were commonly constructed with soft hulls of birch bark or animal hide and were vulnerable to tears and punctures. The solid, all-wood hull of the York boat could simply bounce off or grind past obstacles that could easily inflict fatal damage on a soft-hulled vessel. That advantage became a disadvantage, though, when portaging was necessary. The boat was far too heavy to carry and the crew had to cut a path through the brush, lay poplar rollers and drag the boat overland.

Crewing a York boat was an arduous task, and those who chose this life faced "unending toil broken only by the terror of storms," according to Sir John Franklin.

The York boat had a length of about 14 metres (46 ft) and the largest could carry more than 6 tonnes (13,000 lb) of cargo. It had a pointed bow, a flat bottom, and a stern angled upward at 45°, making beaching and launching easier. The boat was propelled by oars and by a square canvas sail. It was steered by a long steering pole or, when under sail, by a rudder. It had a crew of between six and eight men. The first boat was built in 1749, and by the late 18th century there were boat-building stations from James Bay to Fort Chipewyan. The advent of the steamboat in the 19th century signalled the end for the York boat.

The very narrow Echimamish River flows from the Nelson River to the Hayes River, which thus connects Norway House, Manitoba with York Factory on Hudson Bay at the mouth of the Hayes. In some places the Echimamish is so narrow that the oars of the York boats touched the ground on either side. The route included portages around rapids on the Hayes of up to 3 kilometres (1.9 mi). Crews hauled a York boat 15 metres (49 ft) long and up to 12 tonnes (26,000 lb) of supplies or cargo.

=== A different boat: the Columbia boat ===
Boats smaller and lighter than the York boat, called the Columbia boat, were made specifically for use in the Columbia District and constructed on the Columbia River and its tributaries, where falls and rapids made portaging necessary. They were modeled on the birchbark canoe invented by Native peoples in the eastern woodlands, but were sheathed with thin cedar planks in lapstrake (clinker) fashion, without a fixed rudder. No York boats were made or used west of the Rocky Mountains.

=== Current uses ===
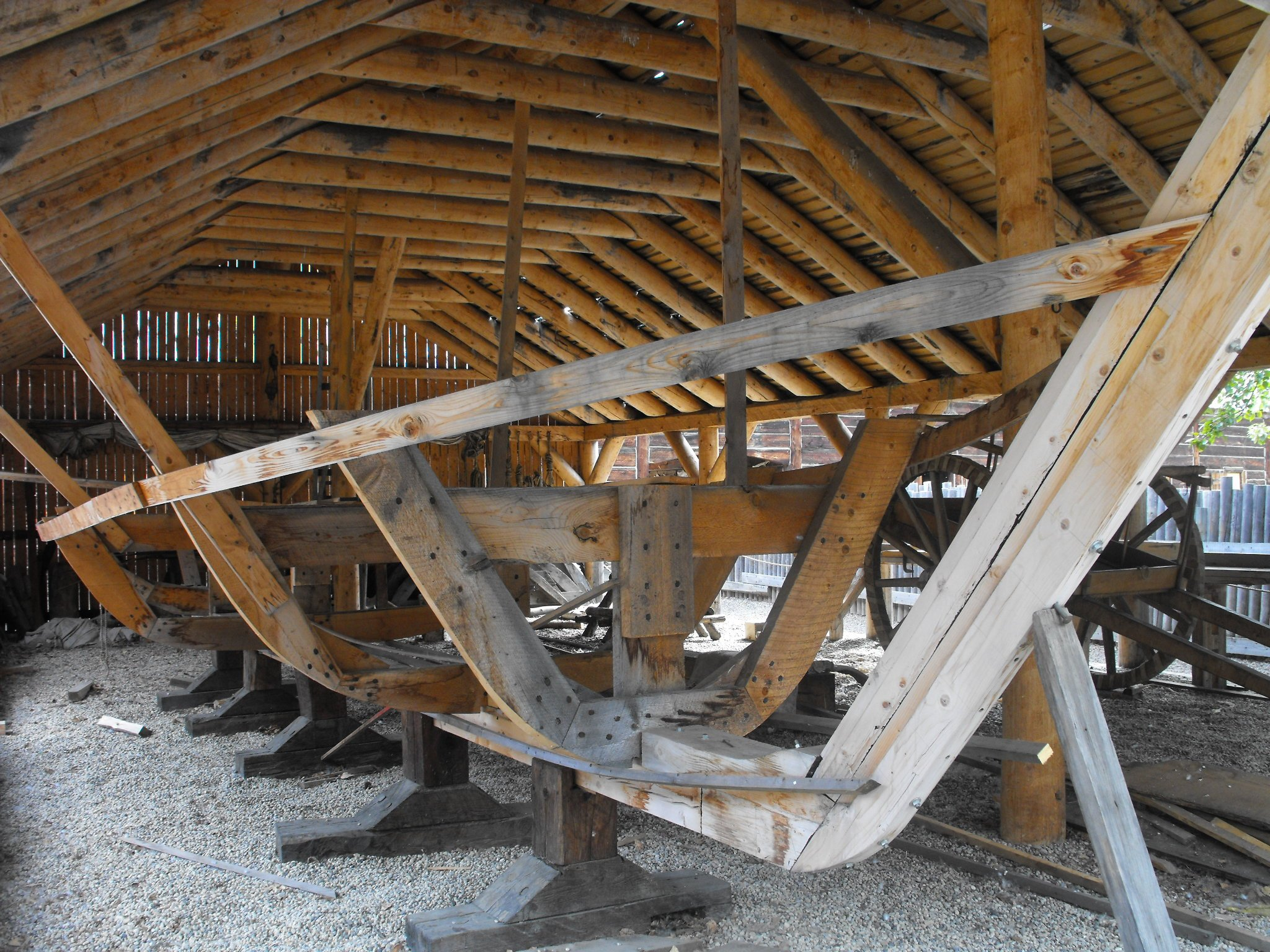
York boat under construction showing use of heavy materials.

A York boat was featured in the Hayes River program of Great Canadian Rivers series on TVO in 2001. The documentary shows a reconstructed boat, the Maryann Muminawatum, rowed from Norway House by eight rowers, a coxswain, and a steersman. Unlike the Hudson's Bay reconstruction, the replica York boat in this video shows crudely carved oars with the midsection left as a thick beam to counterbalance the weight of the loom and blade outside of the pivot point the while the rowers' end tapers to a slender handle.

The Canadian TV documentary Quest for the Bay in 2002 described using a York boat to travel from Lake Winnipeg to Hudson Bay.

York boat races can still be seen in Norway House, Manitoba. Racers compete for a $25,000 top prize in a celebration called Treaty & York Boat Days.

In June 2011, GeoTourism Canada and Flow North Paddling Company recreated a historical expedition on the Peace River, rowing a York boat 10 metres (33 ft) long the 538 kilometres (334 mi) from Fort Dunvegan to Fort Vermilion.

In 2014, three new York Boats were installed at Lower Fort Garry, National Historic Site (Manitoba). This was part of a Parks Canada, National Reconciliation with the Metis People.

== See also ==
- Bateau
- Canoe - the York boat's counterpart/competitor in the Canadian fur trade.
- North American fur trade
- Portage La Loche Brigade
- Red River Cart
- Voyageurs
- York Factory Express
- Columbia boat - York boat variation used in the Columbia Department.
