= Ross Cox =

Irish clerk in the Pacific Fur Company and the North West Company (1793–1853)

Ross Cox (1793–1853) was an Irish clerk in the Pacific Fur Company and the North West Company, later writing of his experiences.

== Life ==
Ross Cox was born in Dublin, Ireland, in 1793, the son of Samuel Cox and Margaret Thorpe. He emigrated to America in 1811, becoming a clerk in the Pacific Fur Company. He arrived in Fort Astoria in 1812, the primary station of the PFC. Due to the War of 1812 the company was liquidated and sold to the North West Company in 1813. He then became a clerk with the Northwest Company, but he retired 1817 and returned to Ireland. He became the Irish correspondent for the London Morning Herald as well as a clerk in the Dublin police office. He was married to Hannah Cumming in 1819 and had several children. He died in Dublin in 1853.

== Legacy ==
Cox's Adventures on the Columbia River (London, 1831) is one of the most important documents relating to the later history of the Northwest Company. Several geographic features in Canada, including Ross Cox Creek and Mount Ross Cox are named after him.
