= Oregon Treaty =

1846 treaty which ended the Oregon boundary dispute between the US and UK

Treaty between Her Majesty and the United States of America, for the Settlement of the Oregon Boundary
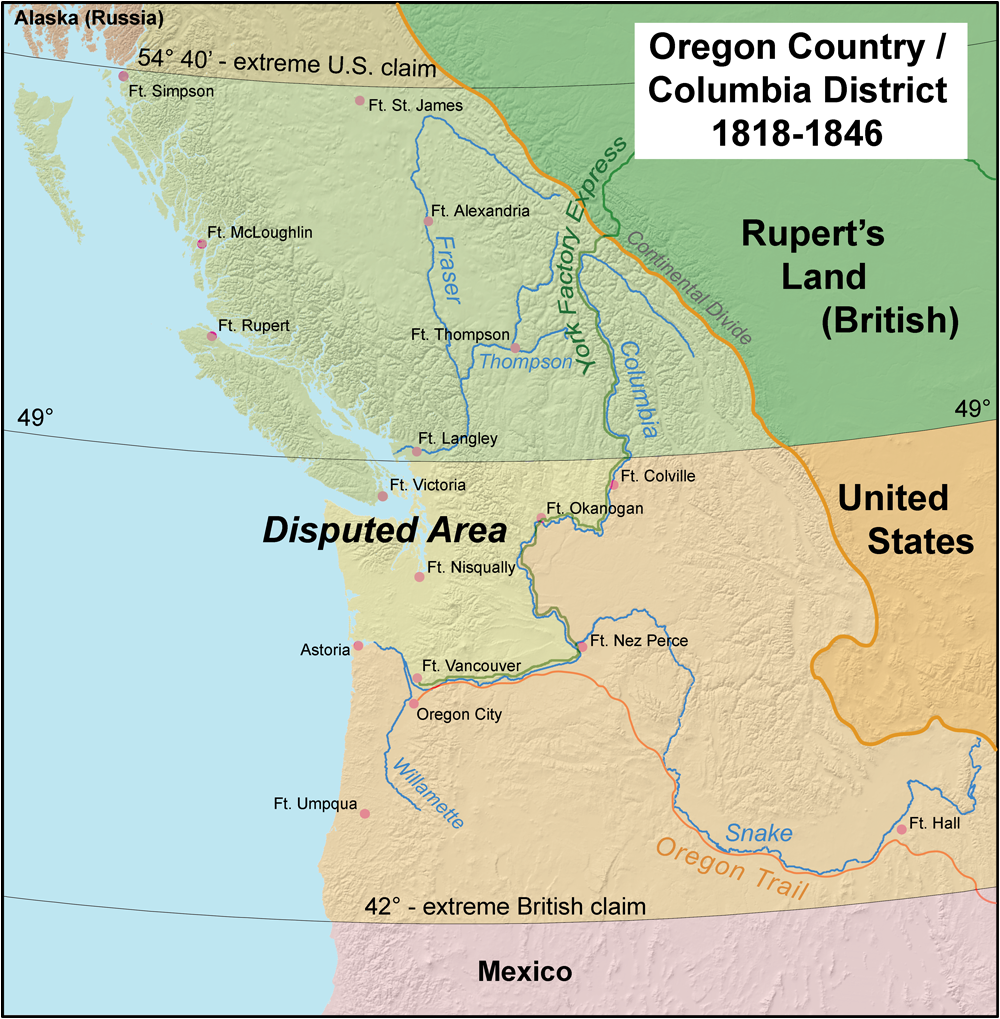
- Map of the lands in dispute
- Type: Bilateral treaty
- Signed: 15 June 1846; 180 years ago
- Location: Washington, D.C., United States
- Original signatories: United Kingdom; United States
- Language: English

Full text
- Oregon Treaty at Wikisource

The Oregon Treaty (Note: Officially titled the Treaty between Her Majesty and the United States of America, for the Settlement of the Oregon Boundary and styled in the United States as the Treaty with Great Britain, in Regard to Limits Westward of the Rocky Mountains, and also known as the Buchanan-Pakenham (or Packenham) Treaty or (sharing the name with several other unrelated treaties) the Treaty of Washington.) between the United Kingdom and the United States was signed on June 15, 1846, in Washington, D.C. The treaty brought an end to the Oregon boundary dispute by settling competing American and British claims to the Oregon Country through partition. The area had been jointly occupied by both Britain and the U.S. since the Treaty of 1818.

== Background ==
The Treaty of 1818 set the boundary between the United States and British North America along the 49th parallel of north latitude from Minnesota to the "Stony Mountains" (now known as the Rocky Mountains). The region west of those mountains was known to the Americans as the Oregon Country and to the British as the Columbia Department or Columbia District of the Hudson's Bay Company. (Also included in the region was the southern portion of another fur district, New Caledonia.) The treaty provided for joint control of that land for ten years. Both countries could claim land and both were guaranteed free navigation throughout.

Original manuscript of the treaty (transcription), as kept by the U.S. National Archives.

Joint control steadily grew less tolerable for both sides. After a British minister rejected the offer of U.S. Presidents John Tyler and James K. Polk to settle the boundary at the 49th parallel north, American expansionists of the "All Oregon" movement called for the annexation of the entire region up to Parallel 54°40′ north, the southern limit of Russian America as established by parallel treaties between the Russian Empire and the United States (1824) and Britain (1825). However, after the outbreak of the Mexican–American War in April 1846 diverted U.S. attention and military resources, a compromise was reached in the ongoing negotiations in Washington, D.C., and the matter was then settled by the Polk administration (to the surprise of its own party's hardliners) to avoid a two-war situation, and another war with the formidable military strength of the United Kingdom.

== Senate vote in June 1846 ==
In early June 1846, the British offered to negotiate the boundaries between the United States and British North America in the region west of the Rockies. Some US senators such as Charles Gordon Atherton and Benning Wentworth Jenness were combative and were in favor of rejecting British proposals to negotiate. However, others, such as both Alabama senators (Arthur P. Bagby and Dixon Hall Lewis) as well as both Massachusetts senators (Daniel Webster and John Davis) were in favor of accepting British proposals. The Senate agreed that they would vote on whether or not to recommend President Polk accept British offers to negotiate. Watching closely, the British hoped this vote would pass the Senate. On June 12, the Senate voted 38–12 recommending that President Polk accept British proposals to negotiate this boundary. Votes in favor included 18 Democrats and 20 Whigs, whereas 11 Democrats and one Whig voted against. Three Democrats and three Whigs abstained.

== Negotiations ==
The treaty was negotiated by US Secretary of State and future President James Buchanan and Richard Pakenham, British envoy to the United States. Foreign Secretary Earl of Aberdeen was responsible for it in Parliament. The treaty was signed on June 15, 1846, ending the joint occupation and making Oregonians south of the 49th parallel American citizens, with those north of it becoming British.

The Oregon Treaty ignored the geography of the mountainous terrain west of the Continental Divide and set the border between the U.S. and British North America as a straight-line at the 49th parallel. Except Vancouver Island, which was retained in its entirety by the British. The hastily negotiated treaty left Point Roberts an exclave. Vancouver Island, with all coastal islands, was constituted as the Colony of Vancouver Island in 1849. Vague and ambiguous language led to the Pig War.

The U.S. portion of the region was organized as Oregon Territory on August 15, 1848, with Washington Territory being formed from it in 1853.

The British portion remained unorganized until 1858 when the Colony of British Columbia was set up as a result of the Fraser Canyon Gold Rush and fears of the re-asserted American expansionist intentions. The two British colonies were amalgamated in 1866 as the Colony of British Columbia. When the Colony of British Columbia joined Canada in 1871, the 49th parallel and marine boundaries established by the Oregon Treaty became the Canada–US border.

To ensure that Britain retained all of Vancouver Island and the southern Gulf Islands, it was agreed that the border would swing south around that area. Ownership of several channel islands, including the San Juan Islands remained in dispute. A bloodless confrontation known as the Pig War erupted in 1859 over ownership of the San Juans, which was not resolved until 1872. Ultimately, arbitration began with German Emperor Wilhelm I as head of a three-man arbitration commission. On October 21, 1872, the commission decided in favor of the United States, awarding the San Juan Islands to the U.S.

== Treaty definitions ==
The treaty states that the border in the Strait of Juan de Fuca would follow "the middle of the channel which separates the continent from Vancouver's Island." It did not, however, specify which of several possible channels was intended, giving rise to ownership disputes over the San Juan Islands beginning in 1859.

Other provisions included:

- Navigation of "channel[s] and straits, south of the forty-ninth parallel of north latitude, remain free and open to both parties".
- The "Puget's Sound Agricultural Company" (a subsidiary of the Hudson's Bay Company) retains the right to their property north of the Columbia River and shall be compensated for properties surrendered if required by the United States.
- The property rights of the Hudson's Bay Company and all British subjects south of the new boundary will be respected.

== Issues arising from treaty ==
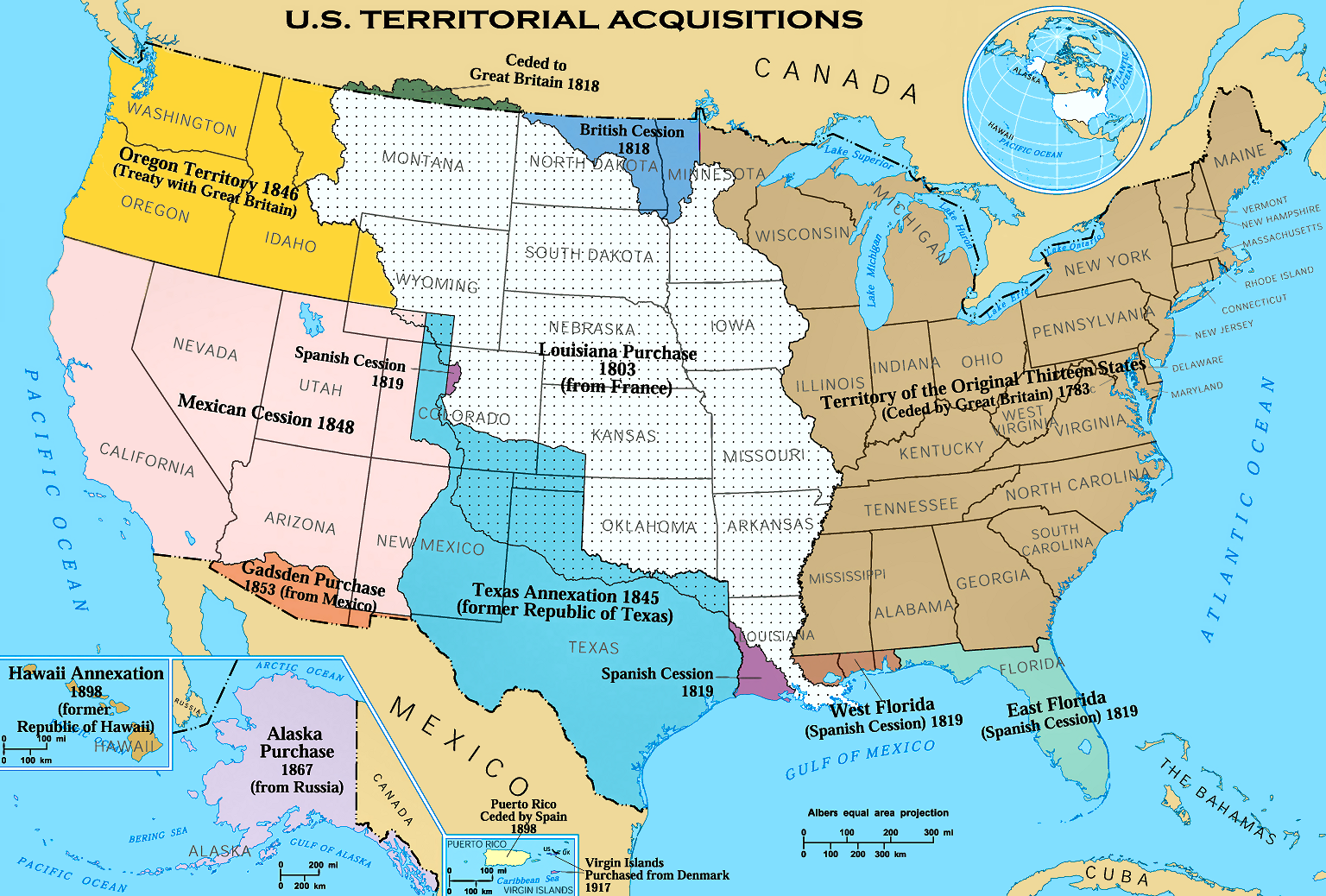
Territorial expansion of the United States; Oregon Territory in yellow

Ambiguities in the wording of the hastily negotiated Oregon Treaty regarding the maritime boundary, which was to follow "the deepest channel" out to the Strait of Juan de Fuca and beyond to the open ocean, resulted in the Pig War. The bloodless war of 1859 over which country owned the San Juan Islands had only one casualty, a large black pig. The dispute was peacefully resolved after a decade of confrontation and military bluster during which the local British authorities consistently lobbied London to seize back the Puget Sound region entirely, as the Americans were busy elsewhere with the Civil War. The loss of navigation rights on the Columbia, together with the strait-line boundary, which climbs mountains and crosses rivers, lakes and canyons rather than following natural boundaries, had effectively isolated the young British Colony. Direct access to London via Hudson Bay and the York Factory Express brigade route was cut off. The remaining colony was just a small window on the Pacific, after the heart of Columbia District was ceded to the United States.

The San Juans dispute was not resolved until 1872 when, under the 1871 Treaty of Washington, an arbitrator (William I, German Emperor) chose the American-preferred marine boundary via Haro Strait, to the west of the islands, over the British preference for Rosario Strait which lay to their east.

The Oregon treaty also had the consequence of putting what became Point Roberts, Washington, on the "wrong" side of the border. The southern tip of the peninsula, jutting south from Canada into Boundary Bay, as 'mainland' south of the 49th parallel became a pene-exclave of the United States.

According to American historian Thomas C. McClintock, the British public welcomed the treaty:

Frederick Merk's statement that the "whole British press" greeted the news of the Senate's ratification of Lord Aberdeen's proposed treaty with "a sigh of relief" and "universal satisfaction" comes close to being accurate. The Whig, Tory, and independent newspapers agreed in their expressions of satisfaction with the treaty. Though a few newspapers had at least mild reservations, the strong condemnation that had greeted the Webster-Ashburton Treaty (which determined the northeast boundary between the United States and Canada) was completely absent. Lord Aberdeen had been determined to prevent such a response to the Oregon Treaty, and obviously, he was extremely successful.

== See also ==
- Joseph Smith Harris' account of surveying the border
- Presidency of James K. Polk
- United Kingdom–United States relations
- Webster-Ashburton Treaty
