= Inkster =

Inkster can refer to:

== Places ==
=== United States ===
- Inkster, Michigan, a city
- Inkster, North Dakota, a city

=== Canada ===
- Inkster (electoral district), an electoral district of Manitoba

== People with the surname ==
- Colin Inkster, (1843 - 1934) Manitoba politician
- Dana Inkster, Canadian artist and filmmaker
- George T. Inkster, (1841 - 1901) American pioneer
- Ian Inkster, writer and technological historian
- John Inkster, (1799 - 1874) Manitoba pioneer, politician, and merchant
- John Scott Inkster, (1924-2011) Scots anesthesiologist
- Juli Inkster, professional golfer
- Nigel Inkster, former deputy director of MI6
- Norman Inkster, 18th Commissioner of the Royal Canadian Mounted Police from 1987 to 1994
