= John Inkster =

John Inkster (1799 – June 30, 1874) was a Scottish-born merchant and politician in Manitoba. He served as a member of the Council of Assiniboia from 1857 to 1868.

He was born in the Orkney Islands and came to Rupert's Land in 1819 as a stonemason employed by the Hudson's Bay Company. In 1826, he married Mary Sinclair, the daughter of William Sinclair, chief factor of the Hudson's Bay Company's York Factory. Later, Inkster began farming and also operated as an independent merchant. He operated a water-powered mill and also was president of a company which constructed a steam-powered grist mill. He also served several public roles, including being appointed to the Council of Assiniboia, as a magistrate, and as a petty judge and as auditor of public accounts.

He died at Kildonan, Manitoba, now part of Winnipeg, on June 30, 1874.

His eldest son Colin served in the Legislative Council of Manitoba and was sheriff for Manitoba. His eldest son George was the first white settler in what is now Inkster, North Dakota.

His former home, Seven Oaks House, now operates as a museum.
