= Mount Sinclair =

Mountain in British Columbia, Canada

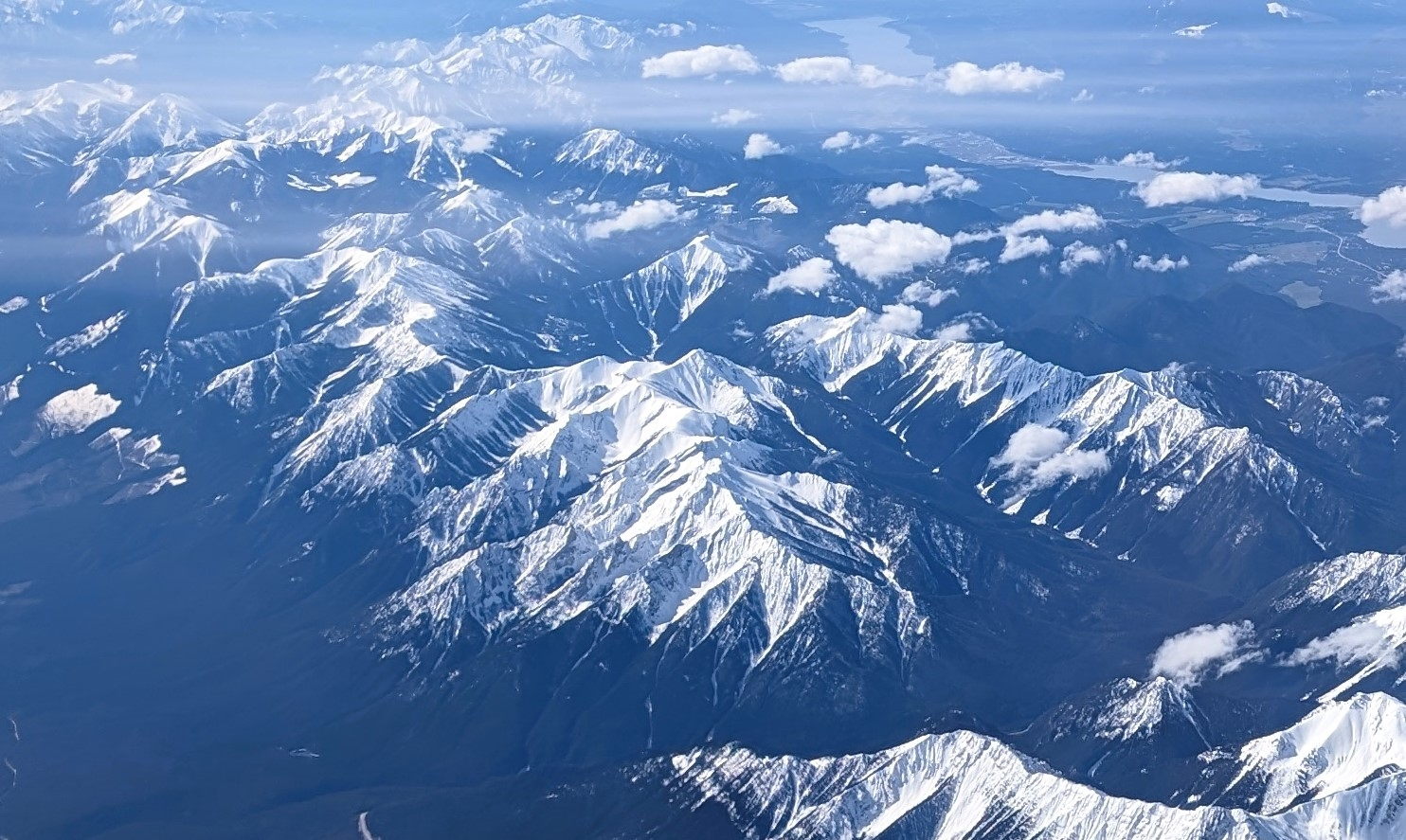
- Summit centered. North aspect, from airliner.

Highest point
- Elevation: 2,662 m (8,734 ft)
- Prominence: 777 m (2,549 ft)
- Isolation: 9.32 km (5.79 mi)
- Listing: Mountains of British Columbia
- Coordinates: 50°38′28″N 115°54′45″W

Naming
- Etymology: James Sinclair

Geography
- Location within British Columbia Location within Canada
- Interactive map of Mount Sinclair
- Country: Canada
- Province: British Columbia
- District: Kootenay Land District
- Protected area: Kootenay National Park
- Parent range: Canadian Rockies; Kootenay Ranges; Stanford Range
- Topo map: NTS 82J12 Tangle Peak

Geology
- Rock type: Sedimentary rock

Mount Sinclair is a 2,662-metre (8,734-foot) mountain in British Columbia, Canada.

== Description ==
Mount Sinclair is located nine kilometres (5.6 mi) north of Radium Hot Springs in Kootenay National Park. The peak is the third-highest point of the Stanford Range which is a subrange of the Canadian Rockies. Precipitation runoff from this mountain's east slope drains to the Kootenay River, whereas the west slope drains to the Columbia River via Sinclair Creek. Topographic relief is significant with the summit rising over 1,400 metres (4,593 ft) above Sinclair Creek in four kilometres (2.5 mi). The nearest higher peak is Mount Kindersley 13 kilometres (8.1 mi) to the north-northwest. Mount Sinclair is named after James Sinclair (1811–1856), a trader and explorer with the Hudson's Bay Company. In 1841, Sinclair travelled through nearby Sinclair Pass while leading an expedition consisting of 121 people from 23 Métis families from Red River Colony. The mountain's toponym was officially adopted on March 31, 1924, by the Geographical Names Board of Canada.

== Climate ==
Based on the Köppen climate classification, Mount Sinclair is located in a subarctic climate zone with cold, snowy winters, and mild summers. Winter temperatures can drop below −20 °C with wind chill factors below −30 °C.

== See also ==
- Geography of British Columbia
- Geology of British Columbia
