= Seven Oaks House Museum =

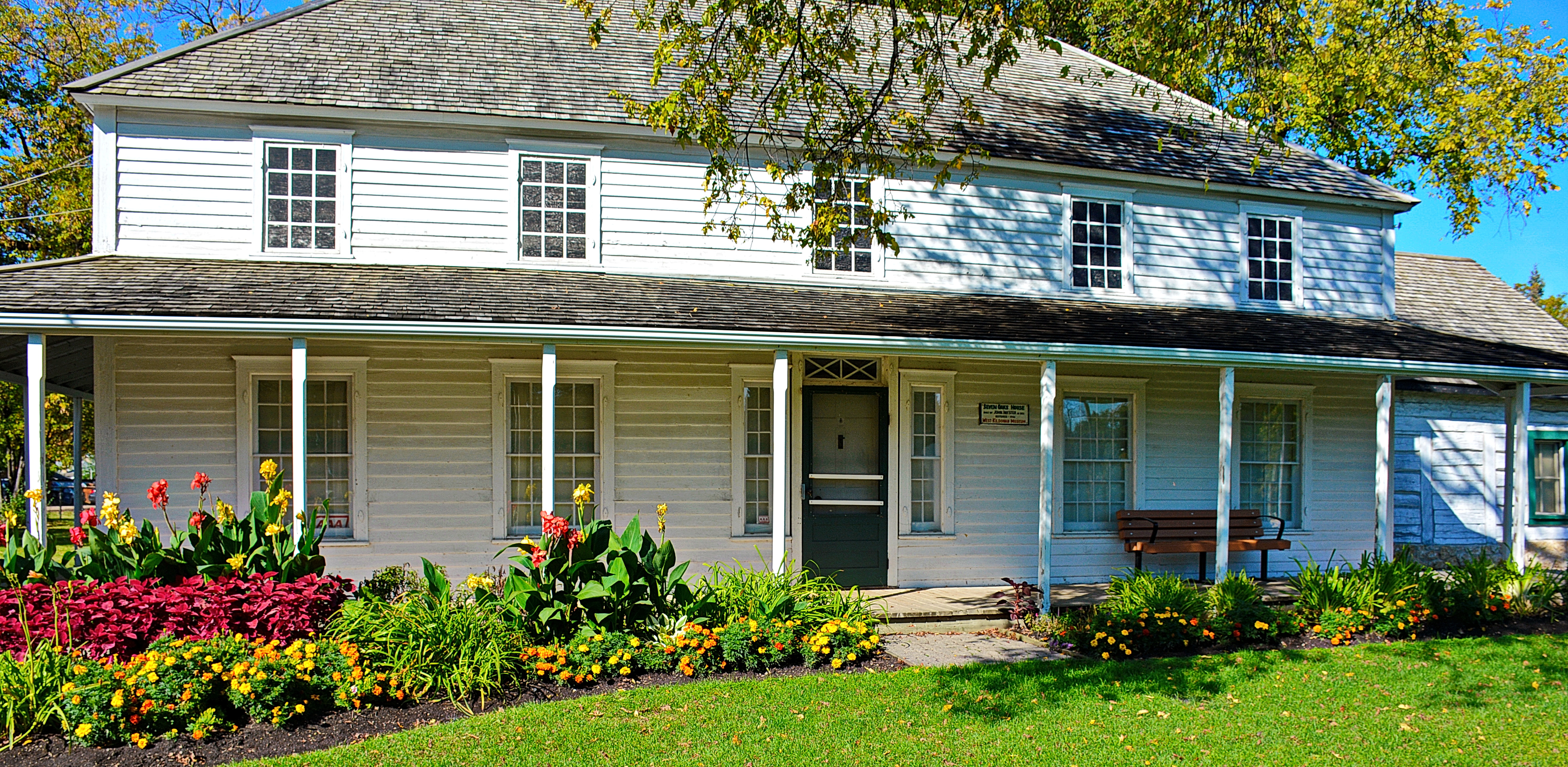
- Established: 1952
- Location: 50 Mac St., Winnipeg, MB
- Coordinates: 49.9304°N 97.1173°W
- Type: Historic house
- Curator: Tracey Turner
- Architect: John Inkster
- Public transit access: 18 North Main / Corydon
- Website: www.sevenoakshouse.ca

The Seven Oaks House Museum is a civic museum in Winnipeg, Manitoba. The two-storey log dwelling is designated a National Historic Site, a Provincial Heritage Site, and a Winnipeg Landmark Heritage Structure.

The store at Seven Oaks House Museum built in the early 1830's is one of the oldest surviving building in Manitoba along with the main house built from 1851 to 1853 and one of a handful of log buildings remaining that give a picture of life at Red River during the 1800s. The historic site is unusual in Winnipeg as the building still sits on its original foundations, and much of the surrounding homestead remains undeveloped. It is open seasonally from the May-long weekend to Labour Day,

== The Seven Oaks Homestead ==
Two buildings survive on the site:

Seven Oaks House is the oldest home in Winnipeg. It was built from 1851 to 1853 primarily of oak logs, with a stone foundation. The nine room home was built in a Vernacular Georgian style for John Inkster, a prominent local businessman and politician.

Inkster's General Store was built c.1826-1831 and is the oldest building remaining in Winnipeg. Originally a two-room cottage, it was renovated c.1853 to serve as a General Store and Post Office. It is a rare example of early Red River Frame (or post-and-plank) architecture.

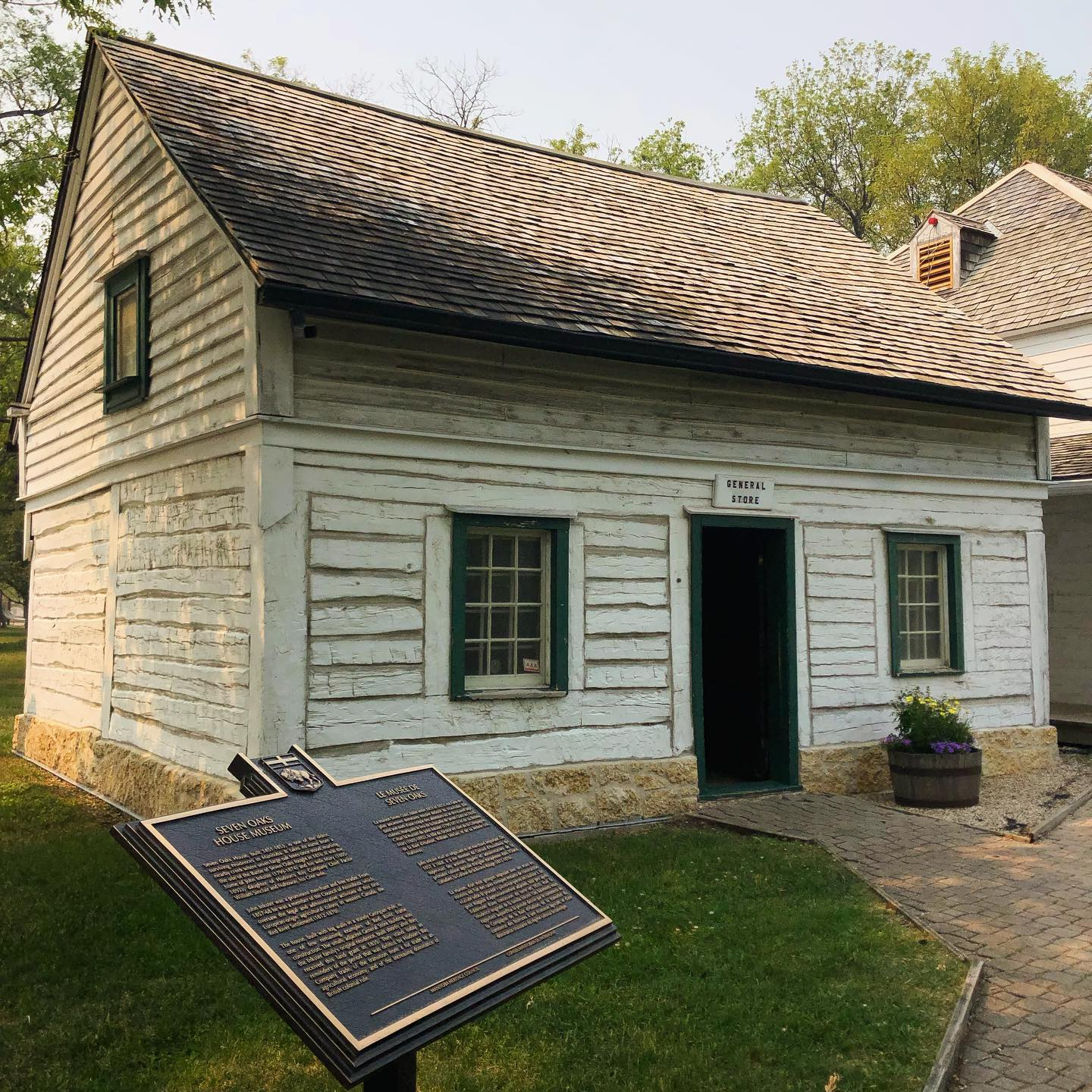
Inkster's General Store (built c.1831) and historic marker at Seven Oaks House Museum Provincial Heritage Site in Winnipeg, Manitoba

Seven Oaks takes its name from a nearby creek where seven large oak trees once stood, marking the site of the Battle of Seven Oaks fought in 1816. The property was owned by the Inkster family until 1912 when it was donated to the City of Winnipeg for use as a park and museum.

== John Inkster ==
John Inkster (1799–1874) was the owner, architect, and builder of Seven Oaks House. Born in Scotland in 1799, he arrived in the Northwest in 1821 as a Hudson's Bay Company servant, but soon became a farmer in the Red River Settlement. In 1826 he married Mary Sinclair (1804-1892), the Metis daughter of the HBC's Chief Factor William Sinclair.

Inkster became one of the earliest independent merchants in the area, operating a shipping business, general store and several mills. He served as a member of the Council of Assiniboia, the regional government, from 1857 to 1868. During the Red River Resistance, Inkster was appointed to represent the English-speaking community of St. John's Parish on Louis Riel's Provisional Government, but illness prevented him from participating.

== Visiting information ==
Both restored dwellings are open to the public. Their furnishings, some of them original, recapture the style and use of the rooms when John Inkster and his family lived here.

The museum is open to the public 5 days a week, Wednesday to Sunday (10am - 4pm) from the May-long weekend through Labour Day weekend. Tours are available and admission to the museum is by donation. The Museum is affiliated with CMA, CHIN, and Virtual Museum of Canada.
