= Sinclair Pass =

Mountain pass in British Columbia, Canada

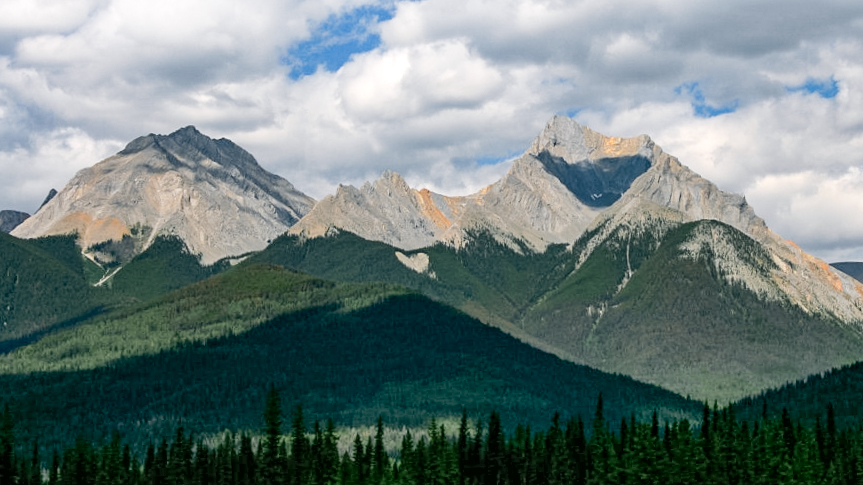
- View to the south-east from the viewpoint near Sinclair Pass

- Location within British Columbia
- Elevation: 1,486 m (4,875 ft)
- Traversed by: Highway 93 (Banff-Windermere Highway)

Third Approach
- Location: British Columbia, Canada
- Range: Kootenay Ranges, Canadian Rockies
- Coordinates: 50°40′24″N 115°56′8″W
- Topo map: NTS 82J12 Tangle Peak

Sinclair Pass (el. 1,486 m or 4,875 ft) is a high mountain pass in Kootenay National Park between the Columbia and Kootenay Rivers to the northeast of present-day Radium Hot Springs in the province of British Columbia, Canada.

== History ==
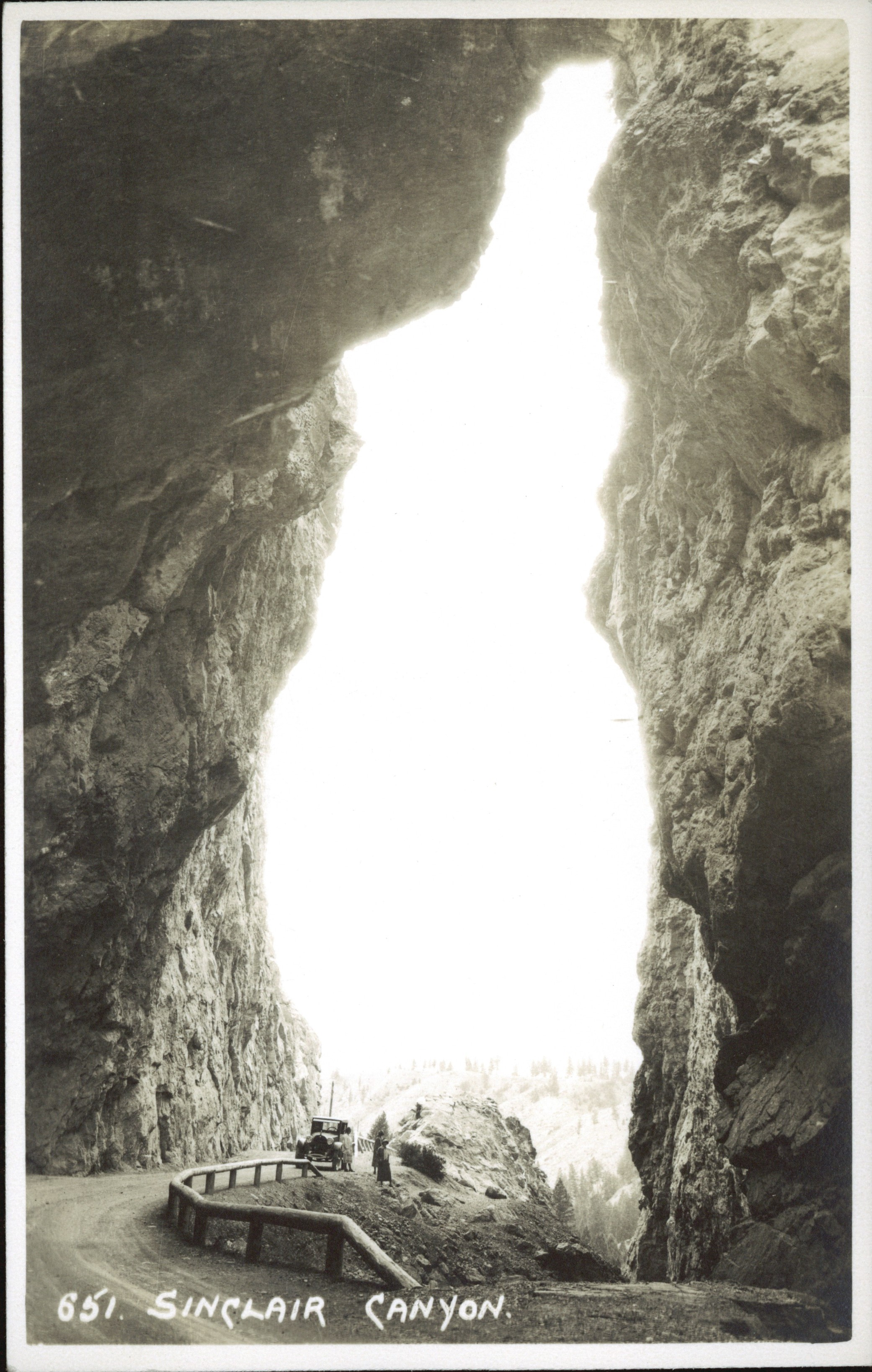
Sinclair Canyon, taken before 1942. Source: Prairie Postcard Collection, University of Alberta Library

It was named after James Sinclair, a fur trading merchant from Red River Colony. In 1841, under the guidance of Cree chief Maskepetoon, Sinclair travelled through the pass while leading an expedition consisting of 121 people from 23 Métis families from Red River Colony. They were hired by the Pugets Sound Agricultural Company to settle outside Cowlitz Farm and Fort Nisqually in modern Washington state. This was an attempt to get the northern bank of the Columbia River awarded to the United Kingdom of Great Britain and Ireland in any potential settlement in the Oregon boundary dispute.

== See also ==
- List of mountain passes

== Bibliography ==
- Galbraith, John S. (1954), "The Early History of the Puget's Sound Agricultural Company, 1838-43", Oregon Historical Quarterly, 55 (3), Portland, OR: Oregon Historical Society: 234–259
- Simpson, George (1847), An Overland Journey Round the World, during the Years 1841 and 1842., Philadelphia: Lea and Blanchard
