= James Sinclair (fur trader) =

Canadian fur trader (1811–1856)

- Born: 1811; Rupert's Land
- Died: March 26, 1856 (aged 44–45) along the Columbia River
- Monuments: Sinclair Pass
- Occupations: trader and explorer
- Employer: Hudson's Bay Company
- Relatives: William Sinclair (brother)

Rupert's Land, before Treaty of 1818, showing location of HBC headquarters York Factory

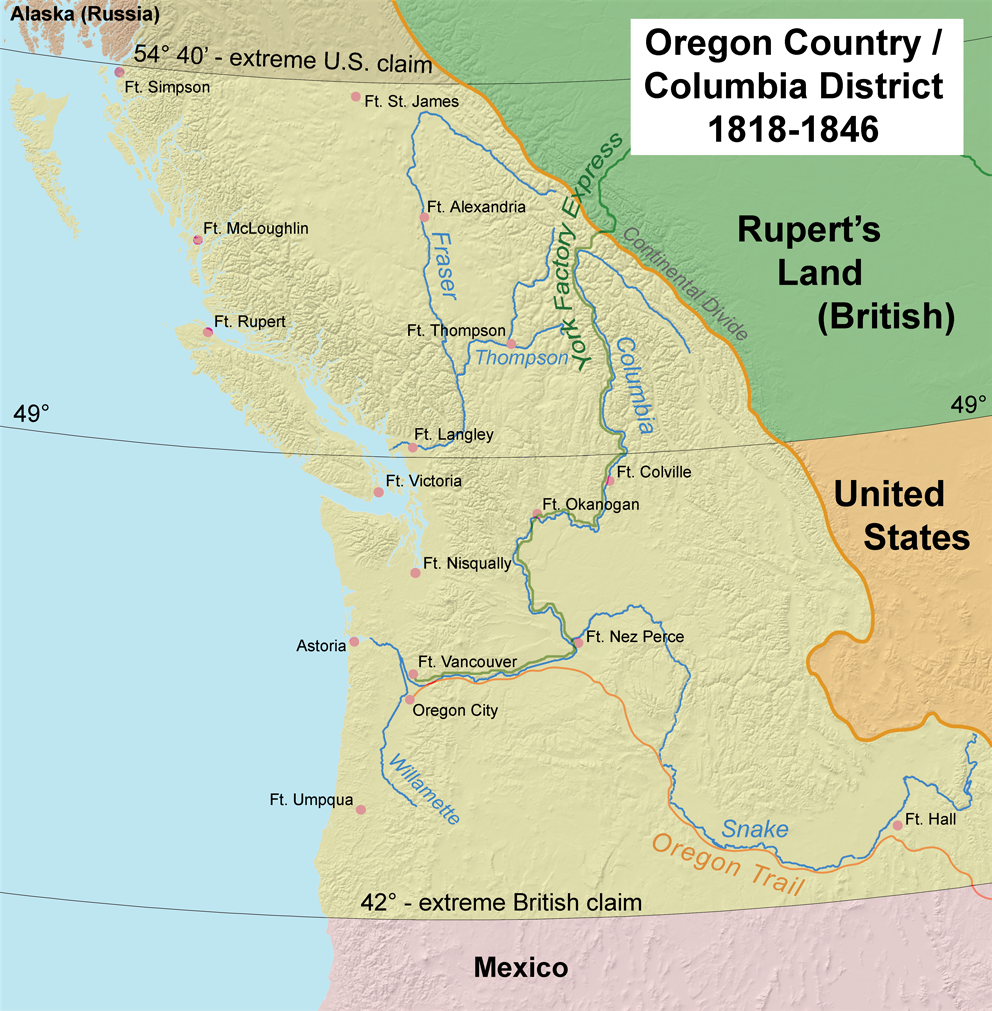
Map of the Oregon Country "jointly occupied" by the US and Britain, showing final portions of York Factory Express and Oregon Trail routes.

James Sinclair (1811 – March 26, 1856) was a trader and explorer with the Hudson's Bay Company (HBC). He twice led large parties of settlers from the Red River Colony to the Columbia River valley. These were both authorized by the HBC as a part of grandiose plans to strengthen British claims in the Oregon boundary dispute.

== Early life ==
James Sinclair was born in 1811 in Rupert's Land. His mother was a Cree woman named Nahovway, his father was William Sinclair, a HBC factor from Eastaquoy in Harray, and his brother was William Sinclair Jr. He was educated in Scotland at the University of Edinburgh.

== Red River colonists ==
James Sinclair was appointed by Duncan Finlayson to guide the settler families to Fort Vancouver on the Columbia River. Most of the families were of mixed race; sons and daughters of Scottish or French fur trappers and their native wives.Métis. The expedition was headed by men who were capable hunters and well-suited to living off the land. They were hired by the Pugets Sound Agricultural Company (PSAC) to settle at company stations in modern Washington state as agriculturalists or pastoralists. In June 1841, the party left Fort Garry with 23 families consisting of 121 people. They followed the Red River north, crossing Lake Winnipeg and traveled in the Saskatchewan River system to Fort Edmonton.

From there they were guided by Maskepetoon, a chief of the Wetaskiwin Cree. Maskepetoon would stay with the party until they reached Fort Vancouver, where he sailed home on board the Beaver. Going through Lake Minnewanka, they eventually reached where the Spray and Bow rivers meet. Following the course of the Spray River valley, the intrepid British colonists then trekked along a tributary, Whiteman's Creek. From here they crossed the Great Divide of the Rocky Mountains, by a new route which became known as Whiteman's Pass.

From the summit, they traveled southwest down the Cross River to its junction with the Kootenay River. They entered the upper Columbia River basin via Sinclair Pass, near present-day Radium Hot Springs. From there they journeyed south-west down to Lake Pend'Oreille, then on to an old fort known as Spokane House, then to Fort Colvile, Fort Nez Perces and finally to Fort Vancouver.

When they arrived at Fort Vancouver, they numbered 21 families of 116 people. Fourteen of them were relocated to Fort Nisqually, while the remaining seven families were sent to Fort Cowlitz. Despite such efforts, Britain eventually ceded all claims to land south of the 49th parallel (except the southern tip of Vancouver Island and surrounding Gulf Islands) to the United States by the Oregon Treaty in 1846, as resolution to the Oregon boundary dispute.

== Later life ==
Sinclair returned to the Red River Colony. He then traveled to St. Louis, then California and finally back to Oregon Territory. He also traveled to London where he petitioned Parliament on the rights of Métis for a free fur trade, which angered Governor Simpson. He and Governor Simpson eventually overcame their animosity, and Sinclair rejoined the Hudson's Bay Company.

In 1854, Sinclair led a second large group of Red River settlers on a secret journey to Fort Nez Percés. He had been promised 200 head of cattle by the HBC for doing so. Upon reaching the Rockies he followed the Kananaskis River south and made a difficult crossing following the Elk River into the Columbia-Kootenay. He died in an Indian attack at the Cascades settlement on the Columbia, March 26, 1856.

== Legacy ==
Mount Sinclair, Sinclair Pass, and Sinclair Canyon in the Canadian Rockies are named for him.

== Bibliography ==
- Galbraith, John S. (1954), "The Early History of the Puget's Sound Agricultural Company, 1838-43", Oregon Historical Quarterly, 55 (3), Portland, OR: Oregon Historical Society: 234–259
- Simpson, George (1847), An Overland Journey Round the World, during the Years 1841 and 1842., Philadelphia: Lea and Blanchard
