= The Steeples =

Mountain in British Columbia, Canada

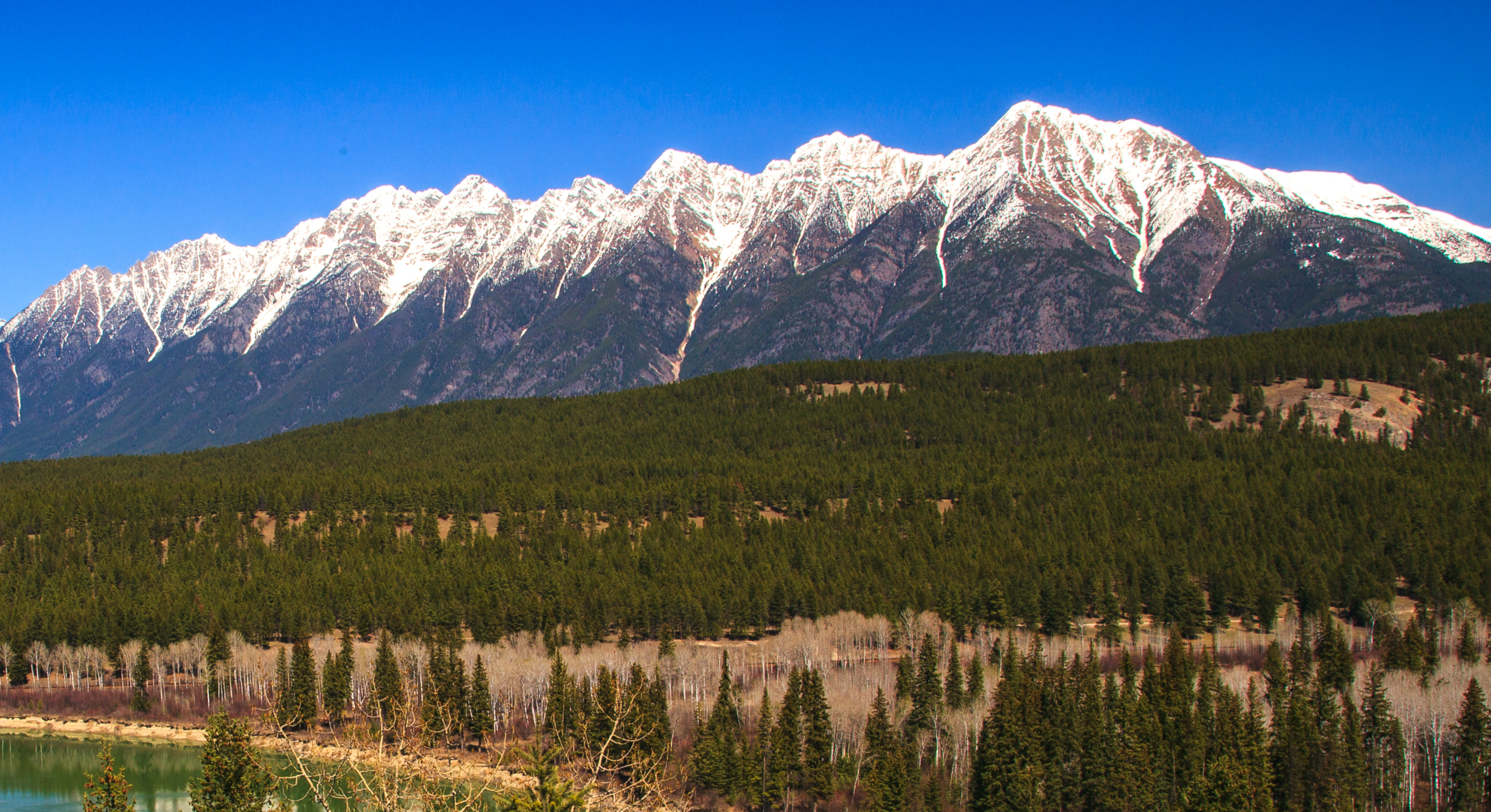
- The Steeples

Highest point
- Elevation: 2,804 m (9,199 ft)
- Prominence: 609 m (1,998 ft)
- Parent peak: Mount Fisher (2843 m)
- Listing: Mountains of British Columbia
- Coordinates: 49°33′54″N 115°25′20″W

Geography
- Location within British Columbia Location within Canada
- Interactive map of The Steeples
- Location: British Columbia, Canada
- District: Kootenay Land District
- Parent range: Hughes Range; Canadian Rockies
- Topo map: NTS 82G11 Fernie

Climbing
- Easiest route: Scrambling

The Steeples is a 2,843-metre (9,327-foot) elevation mountain ridge located at the southern end of the Hughes Range in the Canadian Rockies of British Columbia, Canada. Situated immediately east of Norbury Lake Provincial Park and the Rocky Mountain Trench, this prominent five kilometres in length ridge is visible from the Crowsnest Highway and Cranbrook. The nearest higher peak is Mount Fisher, 10.0 km (6.2 mi) to the north-northwest.

== History ==
The Steeples was named in August 1858 by Thomas Blakiston of the Palliser Expedition as presumably it was believed to resemble church steeples.

The mountain's toponym was officially adopted in 1950 when approved by the Geographical Names Board of Canada.

== Climate ==
Based on the Köppen climate classification, The Steeples has a subarctic climate with cold, snowy winters, and mild summers. Winter temperatures can drop below −20 °C with wind chill factors below −30 °C. Precipitation runoff from the mountain drains into tributaries of the Kootenay River.

== Gallery ==
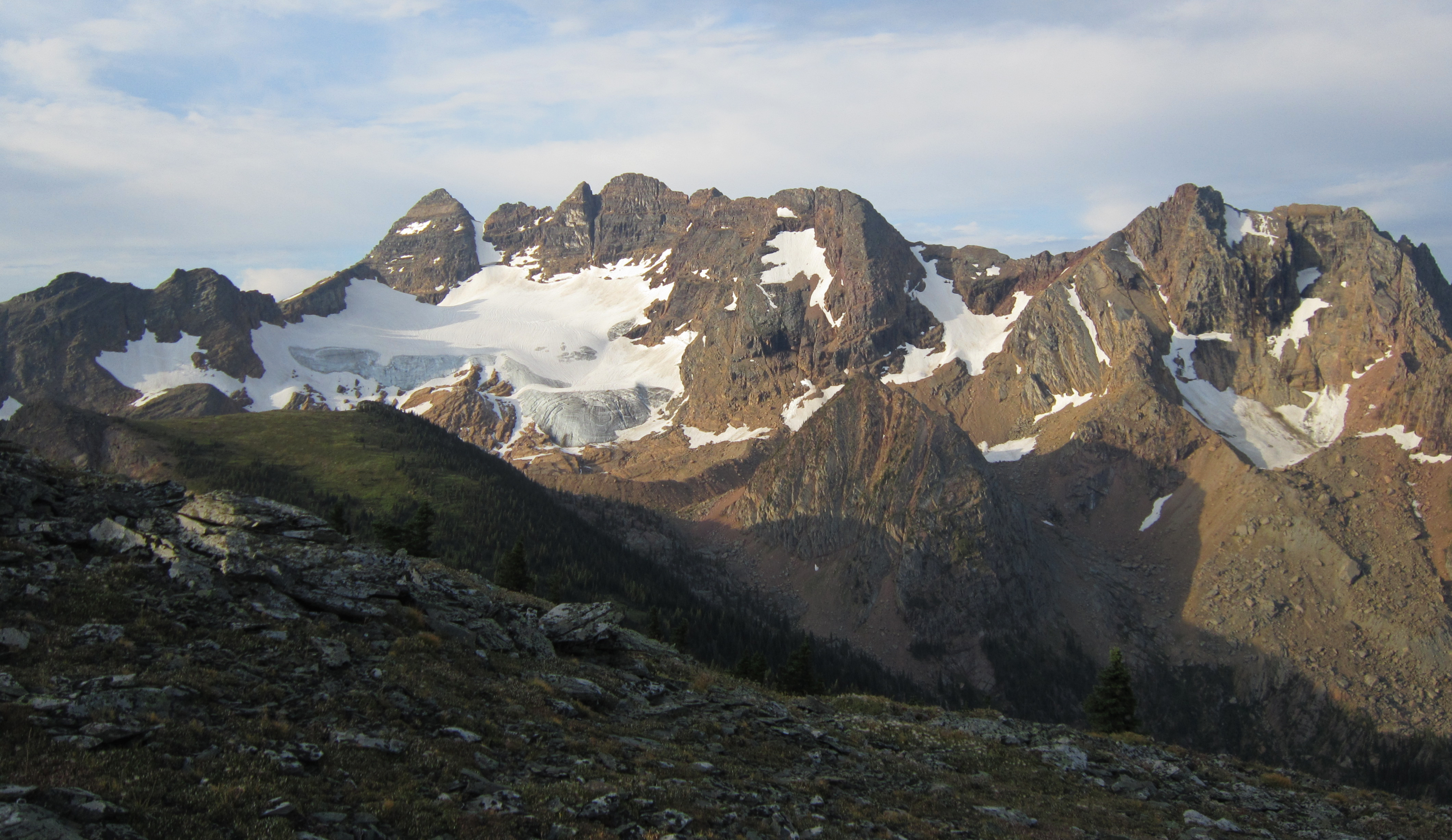
The eastern slope of The Steeples supports a small glacier

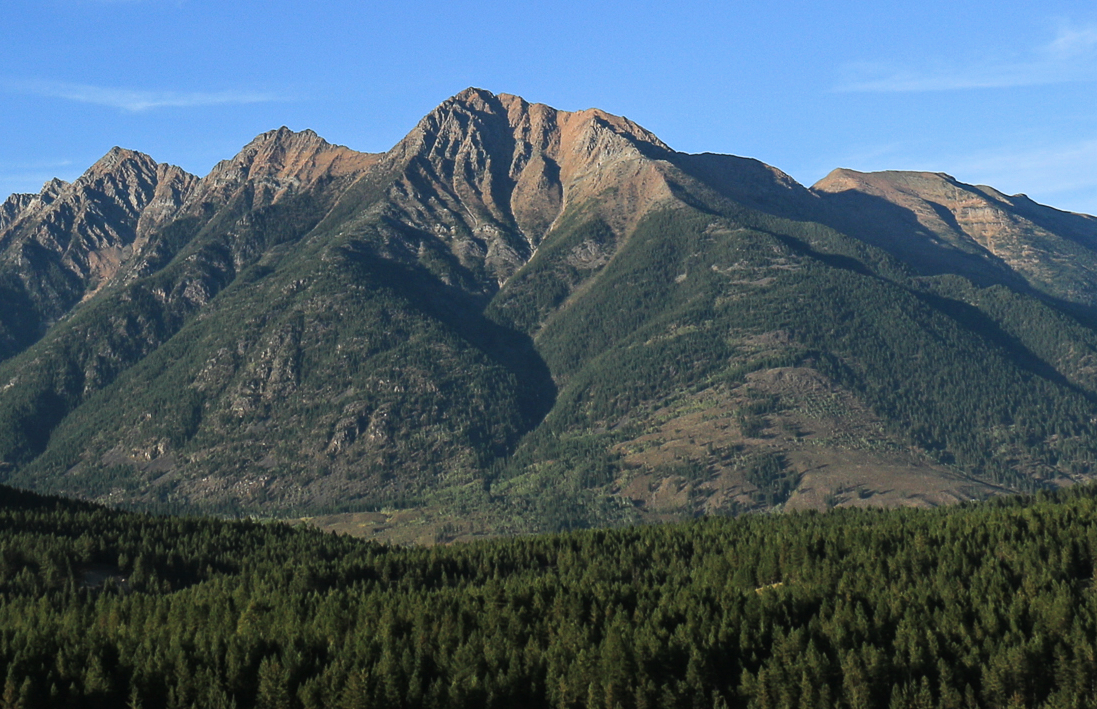
Bull Mountain forms the south end of The Steeples

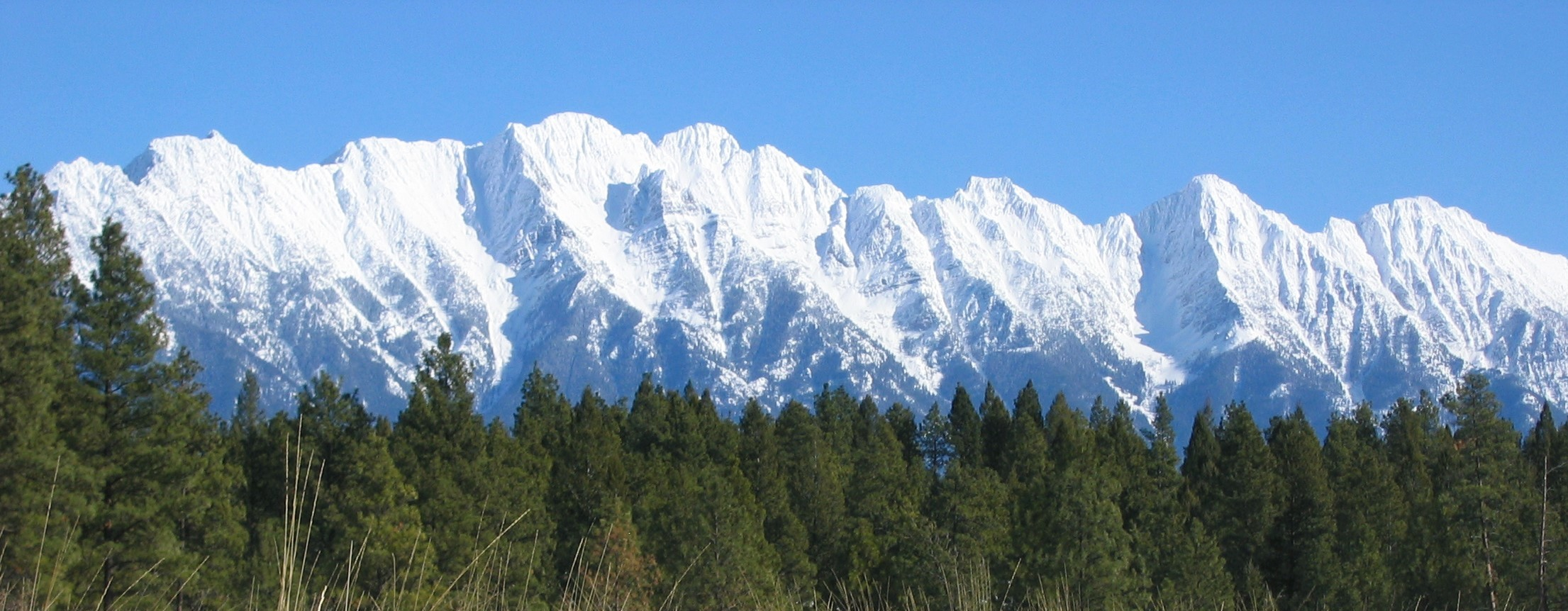
West aspect in winter

== See also ==
- Geography of British Columbia
