= Norbury Lake Provincial Park =

Provincial park in British Columbia, Canada

- IUCN category II (national park)
- Location within British Columbia
- Interactive map of Norbury Lake Provincial Park
- Location: British Columbia, Canada
- Nearest city: Cranbrook
- Coordinates: 49°32′29″N 115°29′08″W
- Area: 0.97 km^{2} (0.37 sq mi)
- Established: July 15, 1958
- Governing body: BC Parks

Norbury Lake Provincial Park (also known as Norbury Lake Park) is a 97-hectare (240-acre) provincial park in British Columbia, Canada.

== Geography ==
Norbury Lake Park covers an area of 97 hectares (240 acres) and is located in the East Kootenay region of British Columbia, approximately 16 kilometres (9.9 mi) south of Fort Steele. It is situated in the Rocky Mountain Trench, with views of the Hughes Range, including The Steeples to the immediate east.

The park includes two lakes: Peckham's Lake in the centre of the park, and Norbury Lake, whose northernmost section falls within the park boundary. Both lakes were formerly known as Norbury Lake, in honour of F. Paget Norbury, a local resident who was a magistrate in Fort Steele in the late nineteenth century. Peckham's Lake gained its name when Norbury sold the adjoining land to the Peckham family.

== Flora and fauna ==
Trees in the park include lodgepole pine, Douglas-fir, trembling aspen and western larch, with shrubs such as chokeberry, thimbleberry, willow.

Fauna in the park includes elk, bighorn sheep, deer and various squirrel species, including the Columbian ground squirrel. Peckham's Lake is known for its stock of rainbow trout.

== Facilities ==
There is a campsite in the southern part of the park, which is open throughout the year, with 46 camping spots.

Norbury Lake Park is used for many recreational activities, including cycling, fishing, hiking and swimming. There is a boat launch on Peckham's Lake for non-motorised craft, such as canoes. Trails are marked through the park for hikers. There is also a picnic area.
