= Hughes Range =

Hughes Range can refer to:

- Hughes Range (Antarctica)
- Hughes Range (British Columbia) in Canada; see List of mountains of British Columbia
