= Castle Mountain (British Columbia) =

Mountain in British Columbia, Canada

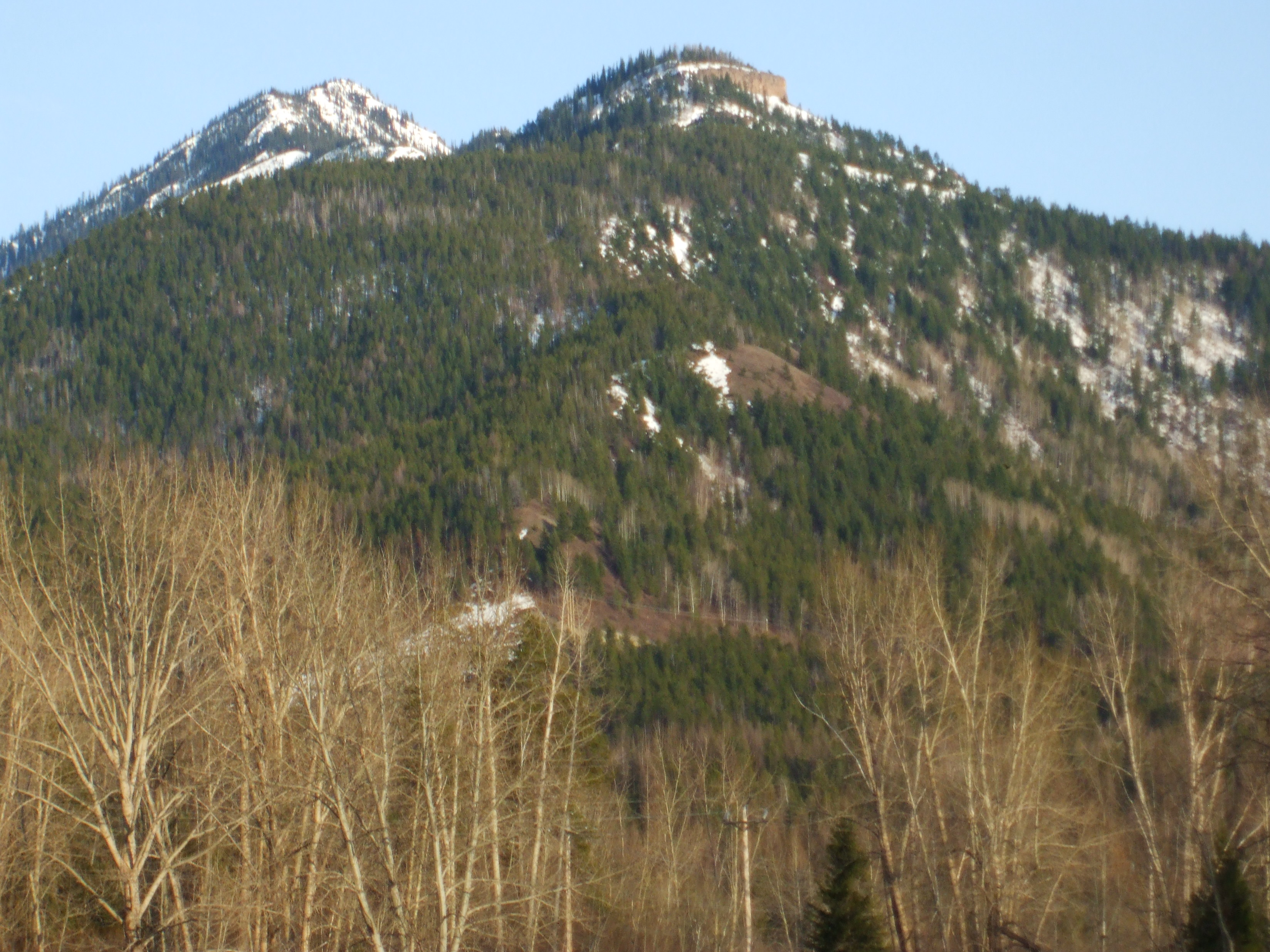

Highest point
- Elevation: 2,546 m (8,353 ft)
- Prominence: 281 m (922 ft)
- Listing: Mountains of British Columbia
- Coordinates: 51°02′22″N 116°26′55″W

Geography
- Location within British Columbia
- Interactive map of Castle Mountain
- Country: Canada
- Province: British Columbia
- District: Kootenay Land District
- Parent range: Beaverfoot Range
- Topo map: NTS 82N1 Mount Goodsir

Castle Mountain is a mountain in the Beaverfoot Range of the Kootenay Ranges in British Columbia, Canada. It is between the communities of Harrogate and Parson on the east side of the Columbia River and has an elevation of 2,546 metres (8,353 ft).

== See also ==
- Coal Creek, British Columbia
