= Mount Fisher =

Mount Fisher may refer to:

- Fisher Caldera, a large volcanic caldera in Alaska
- Mount Fisher (Antarctica), a mountain of the Prince Olav mountain range
- Mount Fisher (British Columbia), a mountain in the Canadian Rockies

== See also ==
- Fisher Massif, a rock massif in Antarctica
