= John Silas Lundy =

- Born: July 6, 1894; Inkster, North Dakota
- Died: April 26, 1973 (aged 78); Seattle
- Known for: blood bank
- Scientific career
- Fields: medicine
- Workplaces: Mayo Clinic

John Silas Lundy (July 6, 1894 – April 26, 1973) was an American physician and anesthesiologist who established the first post-anesthesia recovery room and the first blood bank in the United States.
