= Beaverfoot Range =

Mountain range in British Columbia, Canada

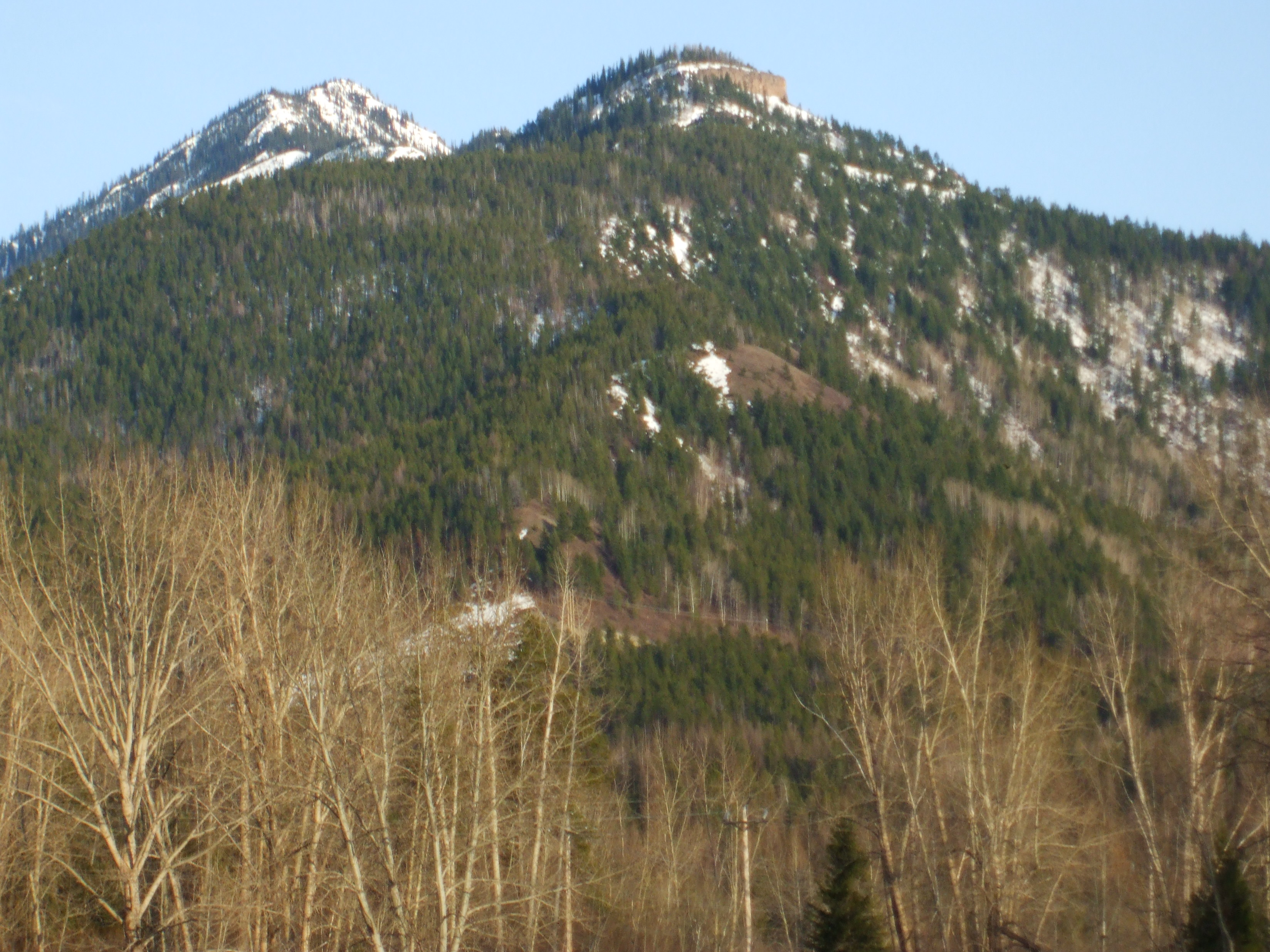
- Castle Mountain (May 2010)

Highest point
- Peak: Kapristo Mountain
- Elevation: 2,722 m (8,930 ft)
- Coordinates: 51°12′44″N 116°44′57″W

Dimensions
- Area: 498 km^{2} (192 mi^{2})

Geography
- Location within British Columbia
- Country: Canada
- Province: British Columbia
- Range coordinates: 51°07′59″N 116°38′04″W
- Parent range: Kootenay Ranges
- Topo map(s): NTS 82K16 Spillimacheen; NTS 82N1 Mount Goodsir; NTS 82N2 McMurdo

The Beaverfoot Range is a mountain range in the Kootenay Ranges of the Canadian Rockies, located in southeastern British Columbia. The range extends from Cedared Creek near Spillimacheen north to the Kicking Horse River.

This range includes the following mountains and peaks:

Name	Elevation (m/ft)		Coordinates
Kapristo Mountain	2,722	8,930	51°12′44″N 116°44′57″W
Castle Mountain	2,545	8,350	51°02′22″N 116°26′55″W
Coral Mountain	2,460	8,070	51°07′08″N 116°35′29″W
Tower Peak	2,460	8,070	51°05′59″N 116°35′22″W
