= Nina Cameron Graham =

First woman to receive an engineering degree in Britain

Nina Cameron Walley (née Graham)
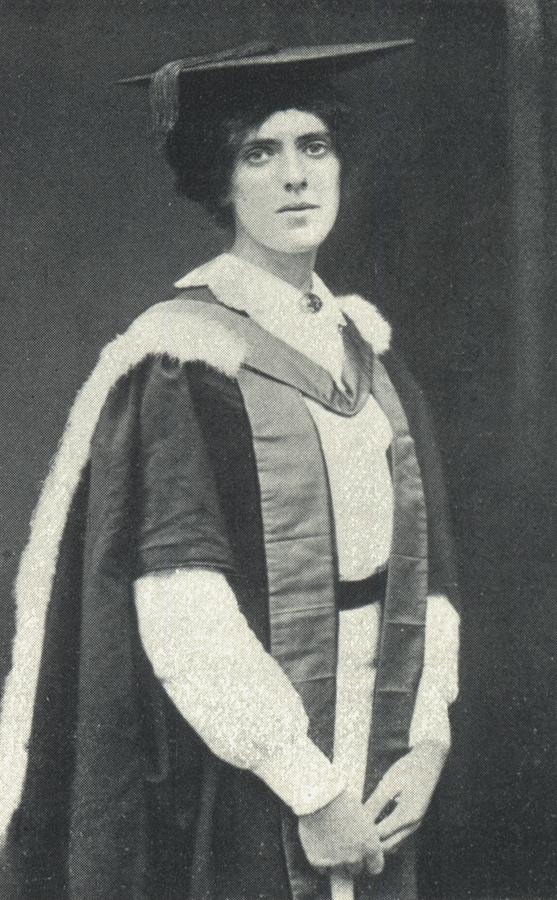
- University of Liverpool Bachelor of Engineering graduation portrait photograph of Nina Cameron Graham, 1912
- Born: Nina Cameron Graham; 11 March 1891; Liscard, Cheshire, England
- Died: 24 March 1974 (aged 83); Winnipeg, Canada
- Citizenship: British
- Education: University of Liverpool Bachelor of Engineering

Nina Cameron Walley (née Graham; 11 March 1891-24 March 1974) was the first woman to receive an engineering degree in Britain.

== Early life and education ==
Nina Cameron Graham was born in Liscard, Cheshire to Mary Cameron Graham (née Slater) and Captain Charles Graham, a former sea captain and chairman at Seamen's and Boatmen's Friend Society. Walley attended the University of Liverpool on general BSc before switching to engineering. She received 2nd division result on the final examinations, including "a gruelling six-hour exam" where she had to design a railway bridge, that awarded her a degree of Bachelor of Engineering.

== Life in Canada ==
After graduating, Walley travelled to Canada and on 12 October 1912, she married Cecil Stephen Walley (1890-1960), a fellow University of Liverpool engineering student, who had graduated two years earlier in 1910. Walley was driven to the church and given away by her cousin, Colin Inkster, then Sheriff of Winnipeg. On their honeymoon, the Walleys surveyed for dam construction in Qu'Appelle valley in Saskatchewan. Walley did not practice professionally as an engineer but assisted her husband, a fellow civil engineer. In a 1965 interview she said, I used my knowledge both to help my husband, also a civil engineer, and my children when they were studying mathematics and physics at school.

The Walleys had 10 children together, five sons and five daughters. Two of Walley's sons were killed while in service in the Royal Canadian Air Force during the Second World War: Flying Officer Keith Minshull Walley was killed in service in April 1943, aged 20, and Flight Lieutenant Kenneth Richard Walley was killed in action in France in October 1944 aged 28.

Walley lived in Winnipeg from 1912 until her death in March 1974.

== Legacy ==
The University of Liverpool awards an annual Nina Cameron Graham prize to the highest ranking female student in their Bachelor of Civil Engineering degree.
