= Fort Nez Percés =

Fur trading post in Washington Territory

Coordinates: 46°05′03″N 118°54′33″W

- Fur Trade Outpost
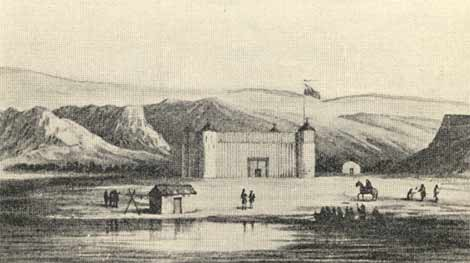
- Fort Nez Percés in 1818.
- Constructed: 1818
- Company built: North West Company
- Location: Wallula, Washington
- Continent: North America
- Later Ownership: 1821, Hudson's Bay Company
- Abandoned: 1857

Fort Nez Percés (or Fort Nez Percé, with or without the acute accent), later known as (Old) Fort Walla Walla, was a fortified fur trading post on the Columbia River on the territory of modern-day Wallula, Washington. Despite being named after the Nez Perce people, the fort was in the traditional lands of the Walla Walla. Founded in 1818 by the North-West Company, after 1821 it was run by the Hudson's Bay Company until its closure in 1857.

== North West Company ==
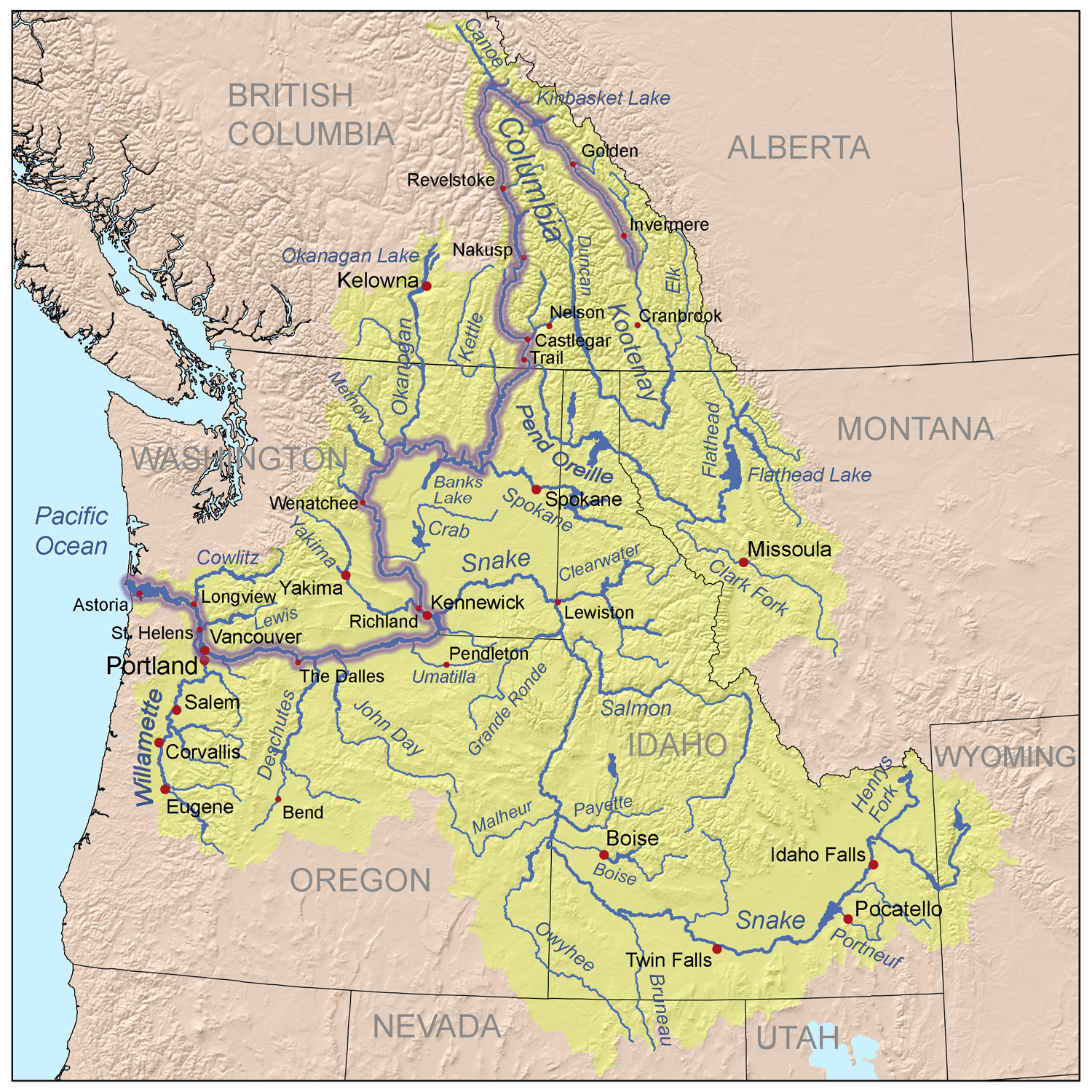
David Thompson navigated the entire length of the Columbia River in 1811. Map of the Columbia and its tributaries showing modern political boundaries

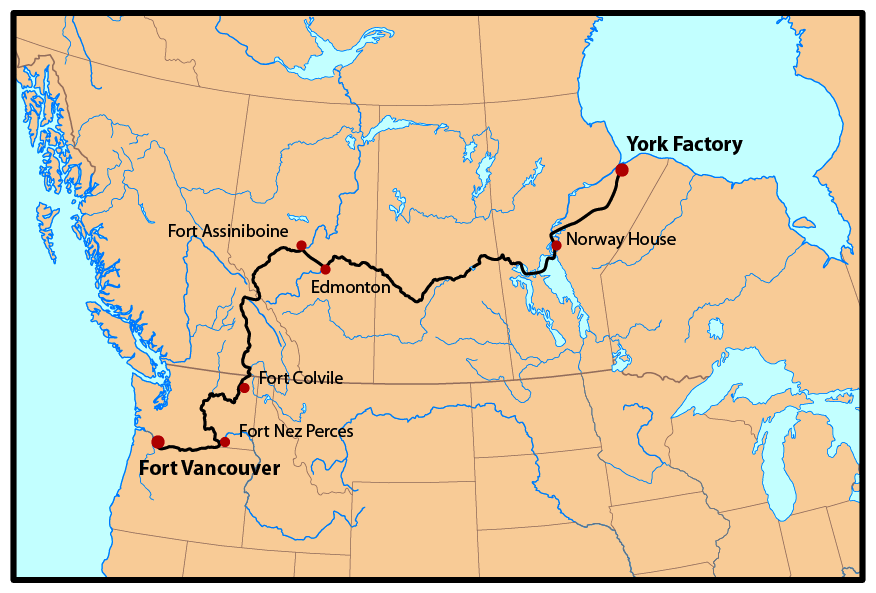
Fort Nez Percés was an important stop on the York Factory Express trade route, 1820s to 1840s. Modern political boundaries shown.

During David Thompson's 1811 voyage down the Columbia River, he camped at the confluence with the Snake River on July 9, 1811. He erected a pole and a notice claiming the country for Great Britain and stating the intention of the North West Company to build a trading post at the site. North West Company managers during an annual meeting in Fort William, gave instructions for a fort to be created near the mouth of the Walla Walla River, a few miles south of the confluence of the Snake and the Columbia.

Begun in July 1818 under the direction of traders Donald MacKenzie and Alexander Ross, the fort was constructed by 95 NWC employees. The company officials secured daily provisions for the laborers by trading with visiting Nez Perce. The surrounding area lacked a forest, so workers had to cut timber 100 miles away and send it down river to the planned fort site. Relations with the Nez Perces quickly deteriorated as construction continued, as Ross recalled.

"Soon after our landing the tribes began to muster rapidly; the multitudes which surrounded us became immense, and their movements alarming. They insisted on our paying for the timber we were collecting. They prohibited our hunting and fishing. They affixed an exorbitant price of their own to every article of trade, and they insulted any of the hands whom they met alone. Thus they resolved to keep us in their power, and withhold supplies until their conditions were granted."

The NWC employees erected an enclosure to protect the work site. The remaining laborers were 38 Iroquois, 32 Kanaka (Hawaiians), and 25 French Canadians. The company men started negotiations with Nez Perce elders to avert an outbreak of violence. The tribal leaders at first insisted that all members of their tribe be given gifts, though a less expansive settlement was adopted, ending "many anxious days and sleepless nights". Ross soon became the first chief factor of the fort or post.

=== Location ===
Constructed on the east bank of the Columbia River, Fort Nez Percés was half a mile north of the mouth of the Walla Walla River and a few miles below the mouth of the Snake River. The location was chosen for its strategic geographic value. The nearby Walla Walla Valley had long been an important rendezvous point for parties working several peripheral fur districts. The 1815 decision by the NWC to refocus the entire New Caledonia region southward to the Columbia River meant greatly increased traffic on the river. Donald MacKenzie intended to open up the Snake River country, adding another operation converging on the area where Fort Nez Percés was built.

Essentially all company exports and supplies passed through the Columbia Gorge. The location of Fort Nez Percés at the eastern end of this trunk line to the ocean made it the most important post in the interior. In addition, increasing tensions from occupying the homelands of the local Native Americans necessitated a permanent fortified post. Finally, the area was significant to the Indians. Not only was it a major meeting and trading ground, but it was where Lewis and Clark had first met the indigenous peoples of the Columbia River and had made an informal treaty of friendship.

=== Fort description ===
The fort was built with a double palisade, unique among North West Company forts. The inner wall was 12 feet (3.7 m) high, and a five-foot wide "strong gallery" was located between the two walls. The storehouse and dwellings were within. Trade was conducted via a small hole in the inner wall. The outer palisade was made of planks 20 feet (6.1 m) high and 6 inches (150 mm) thick, and topped with a range of balustrades four feet high. Towers were located at each of the fort's four corners; these contained large water tanks for fighting enemy fire. Soon after the post was built, Alexander Ross said it was "the strongest and most complete fort west of the Rocky Mountains, and might be called the Gibraltar of the Columbia."

While traveling west with fellow members of the American Board of Commissioners for Foreign Missions, William H. Gray described the original fort's appearance thus:

"Old Fort Wallawalla, in 1836, when the mission party arrived, was a tolerably substantial stockade, built of drift-wood taken from the Columbia River, of an oblong form, with two log bastions raised, one on the southwest corner, commanding the river-front and southern space beyond the stockade; the other bastion was on the northeast corner, commanding the north end, and east side of the fort. In each of these bastions were kept two small cannon, with a good supply of small-arms. These bastions were always well guarded when any danger was suspected from the Indians. The sage brush, willow and grease-wood had been cut and cleared away for a considerable distance around, to prevent any Indian getting near the fort without being discovered. Inside the stockade were the houses, store, and quarters for the men, with a space sufficiently large to corral about one hundred horses."

=== Snake River expeditions ===
In September 1818, Donald MacKenzie left his new base at Fort Nez Percés to lead a large fur trapping party into the Snake River country. The operation was a major departure from the usual practice of the North West Company. MacKenzie spent the winter of 1818–1819 shifting camps and trapping in a large region. His return to Fort Nez Percés in July 1819 with an unusually large and valuable catch won him praise and vindicated the establishment of Fort Nez Percés, about which some company partners had been skeptical. The Snake country expeditions from Fort Nez Percés became an annual affair and regularly produced a large portion of company's entire fur export west of the Rocky Mountains.

== Hudson's Bay Company ==
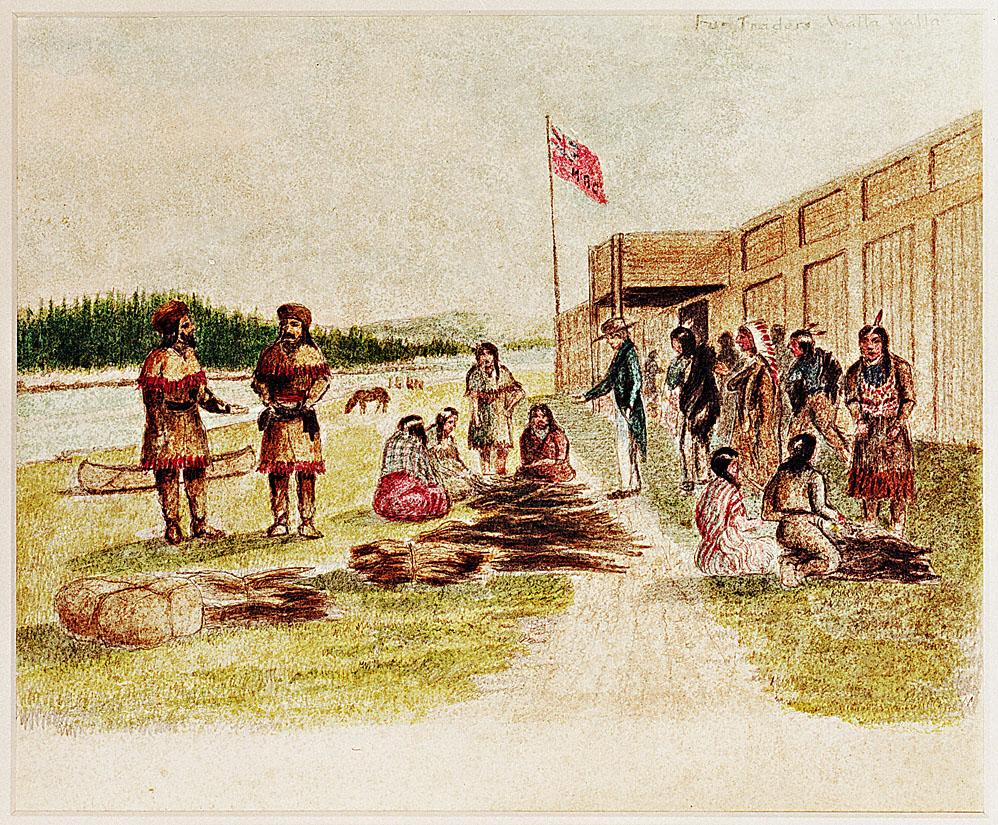
Fur trading at Fort Nez Percés in 1841.

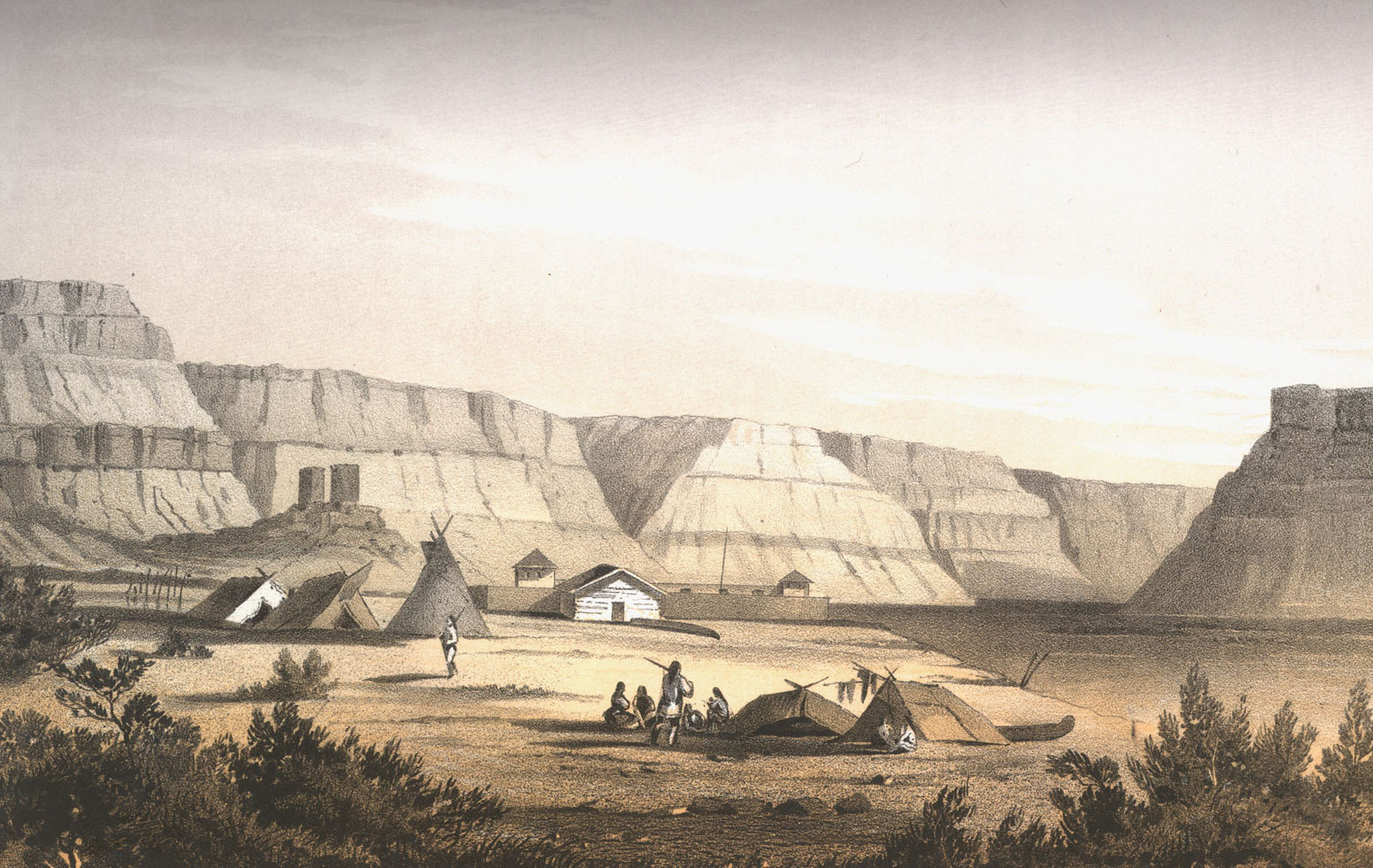
Fort Nez Percés in 1853.

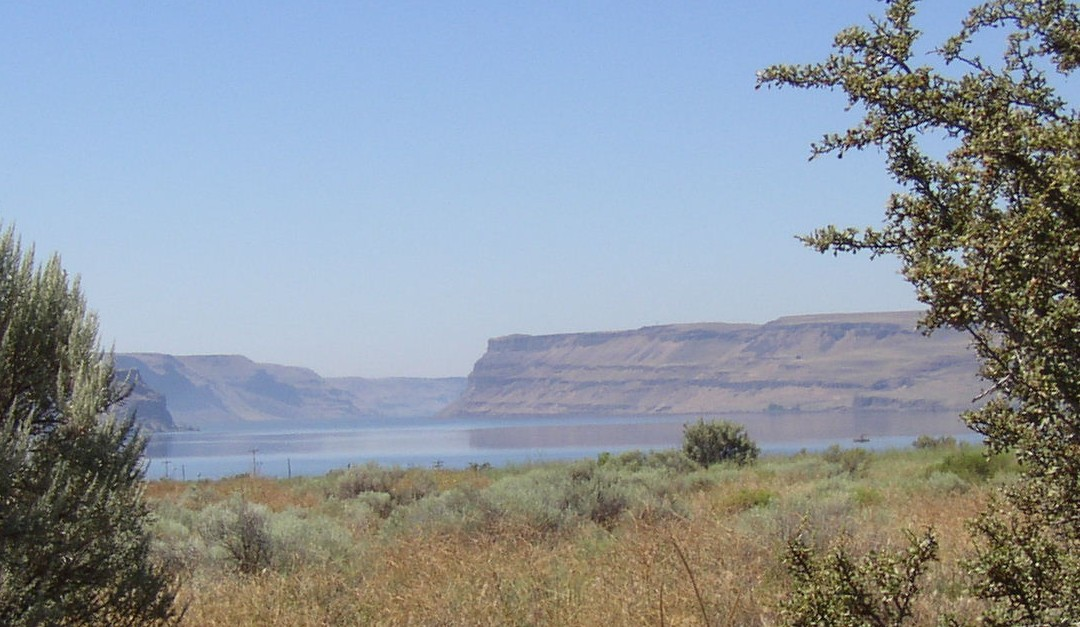
Looking down on location of Fort Nez Percés, as seen in 2006.

In 1821, the escalating conflicts between the competing North West Company and the Hudson's Bay Company resulted in a forced merger of the two. The Hudson's Bay Company took over all the North West Company's operations, and administered them as the Columbia District. Fort Nez Percés remained an important HBC fur trade post and base for beaver hunting expeditions, as well as an important stop on the twice annual York Factory Express trade route to London via Hudson Bay. The Fort, along with other HBC forts on the western end of the Oregon Trail route, including Fort Vancouver near its terminus in the Willamette Valley; all gave substantial and often desperately needed aid to the early American Oregon Trail pioneers.

=== Rebuilt fort ===
Shortly after a visit by the American Charles Wilkes' expedition (which lost one of two ships on Columbia River bar); the fort was destroyed by fire on October 5, 1841. The HBC's Sinclair settlement expedition from the Red River Colony passed through one day after the fire. They helped save what they could, but they decided not to stay. Rather they traveled through the night because the large number of Indians in the area made it unsafe to camp. Cayuse leadership gathered nearby Indians to rescue the fort's properties and prevent looting.

Fort Nez Percés was subsequently rebuilt with adobe bricks. The buildings inside the fort were constructed of a wooden frame with adobe brick walls. Manufacture of the bricks used local "wild rye", and some bricks likely originated from Marcus Whitman's mission.

== United States ==
The fort found itself on US soil in 1846 as a result of the Oregon Treaty, which ended the Oregon boundary dispute with Britain. The British lost the lands north of the Columbia River they had long controlled. The new border was established ignoring geography; as a straight line through mountainous terrain much further north at the 49th parallel. The treaty did allow Hudson's Bay Company navigation rights on the Columbia River for ten years to supply their fur posts, and clear titles to their trading post properties allowing them to be sold later if they wanted. HBC continued to operate the Fort Nez Percés for another decade. It was again burnt down at the beginning of the Yakima War in 1855. James Sinclair was among the casualties of the battle. The fort was rebuilt a second time, but was eventually abandoned in 1857 when the Hudson's Bay Company gave up its declining commercial business in the Oregon Territory. Its headquarters for the Columbia Department was relocated from Fort Vancouver to Fort Victoria, in present-day British Columbia.

With the completion of McNary Dam in 1954, the site was flooded and is now under Lake Wallula, near Wallula, Washington.

== US Fort Walla Walla ==
The US military erected a new Fort Walla Walla in 1858 at nearby Walla Walla, Washington.

== Management ==
Manager	Rank	Tenure
Donald McKenzie	Proprietor	1818
Alexander Ross	Proprietor	1818-1823
John Warren Dease	Chief Trader	1823-1825
Samuel Black	Chief Trader	1825-1830
George Barnston		1830-1831
Simon McGillivray Jr.	Chief Trader	1831-1832
Pierre Pambrun	clerk	1832-1840
Pierre Pambrun	Chief Trader	1840-1841
Archibald McKinlay	clerk	1841-1846
William McBean	clerk	1846-1852
Richard Grant	Chief Trader	1851-1852
Andrew Pambrun	clerk	1852-1855
James Sinclair		1855
