= Colin Inkster =

Canadian politician

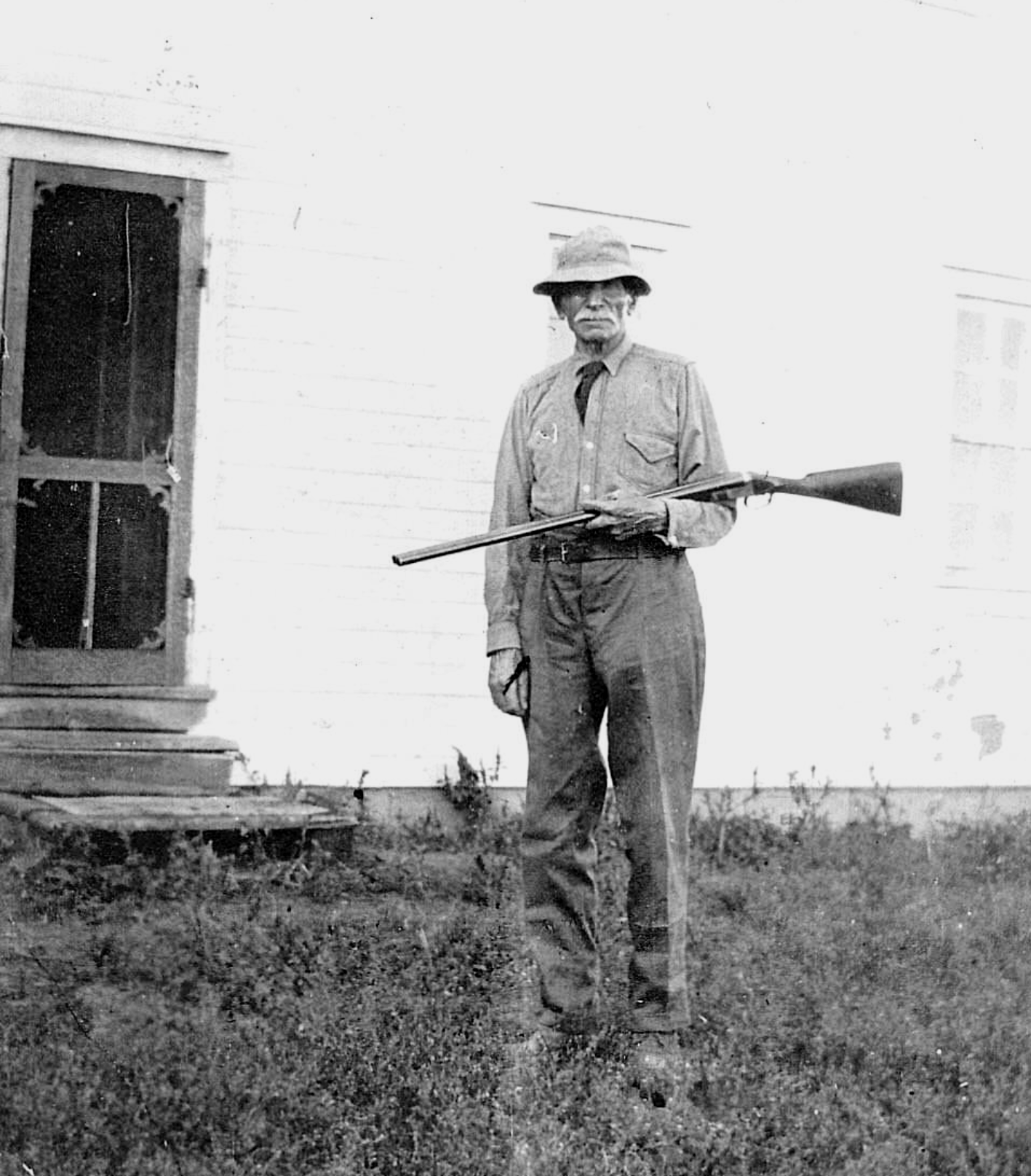
- Colin Inkster at Bleak House
- Born: 3 August 1843; Kildonan, Rupert's Land
- Died: 28 September 1934 (aged 91); Delta Marsh
- Occupation: political figure
- Years active: 1871–1928
- Known for: member, Legislative Council of Manitoba, sheriff (52 years)
- Spouse: Annie Tait (m.1871)
- Parents: John Inkster (father); Mary Sinclair (mother)

Colin Inkster (August 3, 1843 – September 28, 1934) was a political figure in Manitoba. He was a member of the Legislative Council of Manitoba from 1871 to 1876, serving as its speaker in the final year when the council voted itself out of existence.

He was born in Kildonan, Manitoba, the son of John Inkster, a native of Scotland, and Mary Sinclair, the daughter of William Sinclair, chief factor with the Hudson's Bay Company. Inkster was educated at St. John's College in Winnipeg. In 1871, he married Annie Tait. He was named sheriff in 1876 and served in that position for 52 years. Inkster also served as rector for St. John's Cathedral. He was the cousin of Nina Cameron Graham, the first woman to receive an engineering degree in Britain, and gave her away at her wedding to Cecil Stephen Walley in 1912.

Inkster was known to skip rope every morning for exercise.

He died after suffering smoke inhalation during a fire at his hunting lodge on Delta Marsh.

His former home, which he named Bleak House after a novel by Charles Dickens, is now designated as a heritage property by the city of Winnipeg.
