= Mount Fisher (British Columbia) =

Mountain in British Columbia, Canada

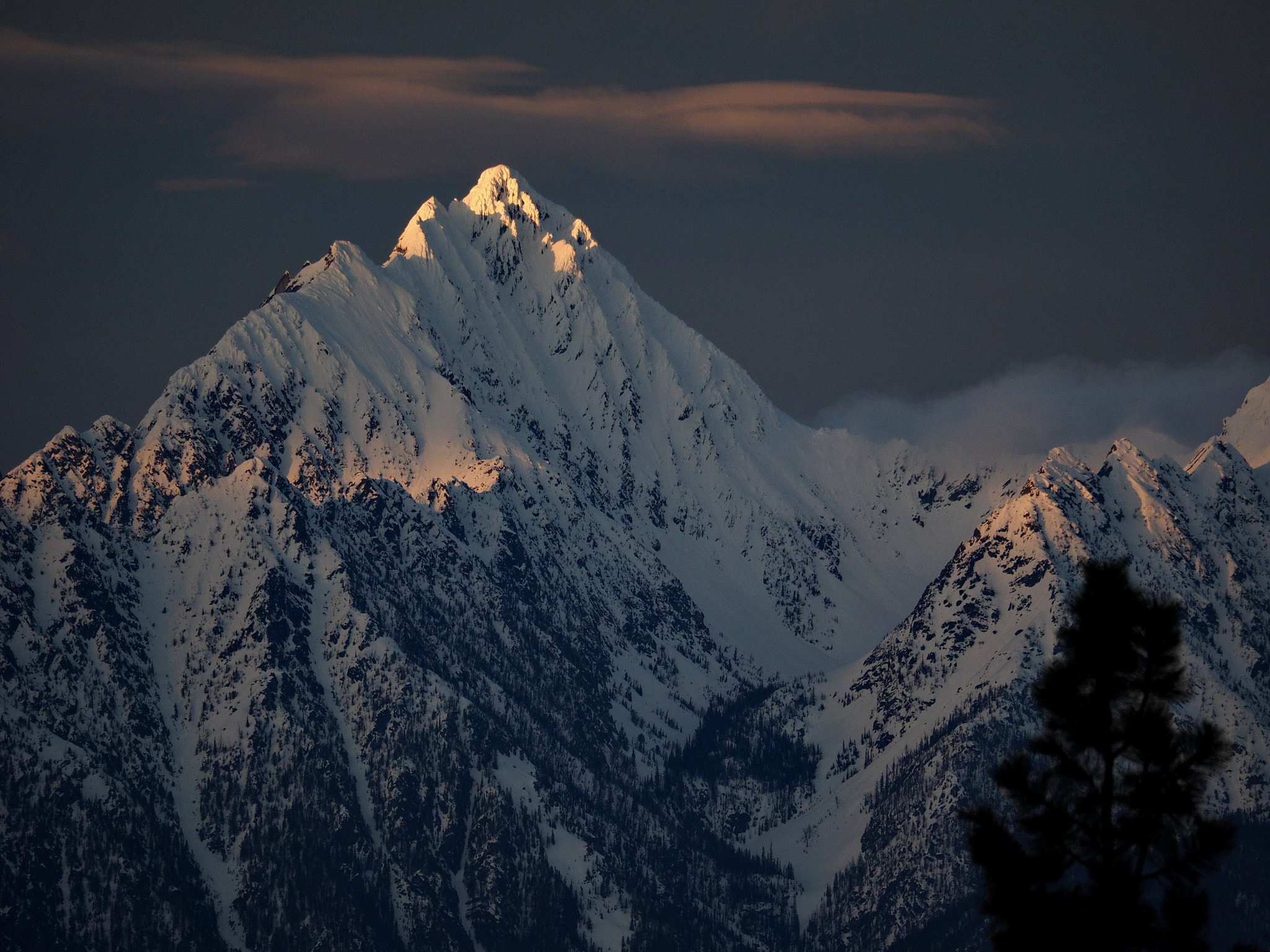
- Mount Fisher

Highest point
- Elevation: 2,843 m (9,327 ft)
- Prominence: 873 m (2,864 ft)
- Parent peak: Mount Morro (2845 m)
- Listing: Mountains of British Columbia
- Coordinates: 49°38′47″N 115°29′04″W

Geography
- Location within British Columbia Location within Canada
- Interactive map of Mount Fisher
- Location: British Columbia, Canada
- District: Kootenay Land District
- Parent range: Hughes Range; Canadian Rockies
- Topo map: NTS 82G11 Fernie

Climbing
- First ascent: 1913 A. Nichols, G. Lum
- Easiest route: Scramble

Mount Fisher, also known locally as Fisher Peak, is a 2,843-metre (9,327-foot) mountain summit located in the Hughes Range of the Canadian Rockies in British Columbia, Canada. Situated east of historic Fort Steele and the Rocky Mountain Trench, this prominent peak is visible from the Crowsnest Highway and Cranbrook. Its nearest higher peak is Mount Morro, 23.0 km (14.3 mi) to the north. The Steeples are located 10.0 km (6.2 mi) to the south.

== History ==
Mount Fisher was named in 1915 for John S. ("Jack") Fisher, a prospector who discovered gold in nearby Wildhorse Creek in 1863, and in 1864. The mining community that sprang up at Wildhorse Creek was called Fisherville, only to be razed in 1866 in order to work the ground where it stood.

The first ascent of the mountain was made in 1913 by A. Nichols and G. Lum.

The mountain's toponym was officially adopted in 1924 by the Geographical Names Board of Canada.

Following NHL championship seasons in 2000 and 2007, Cranbrook resident Scott Niedermayer posed atop the summit with the Stanley Cup.

== Climate ==
Based on the Köppen climate classification, Mount Fisher has a subarctic climate with cold, snowy winters, and mild summers. Temperatures can drop below −20 °C with wind chill factors below −30 °C. Precipitation runoff from the mountain drains into tributaries of the Kootenay River.

== Gallery ==
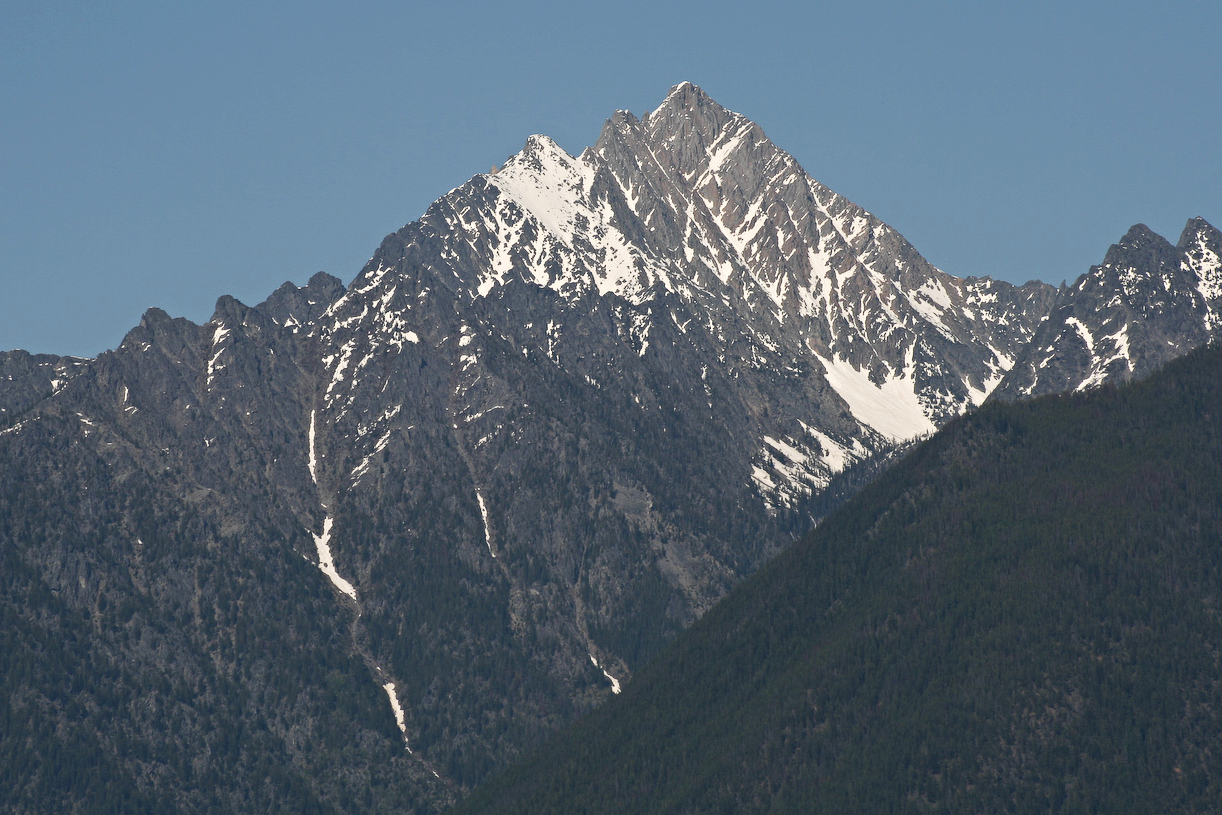
Mount Fisher

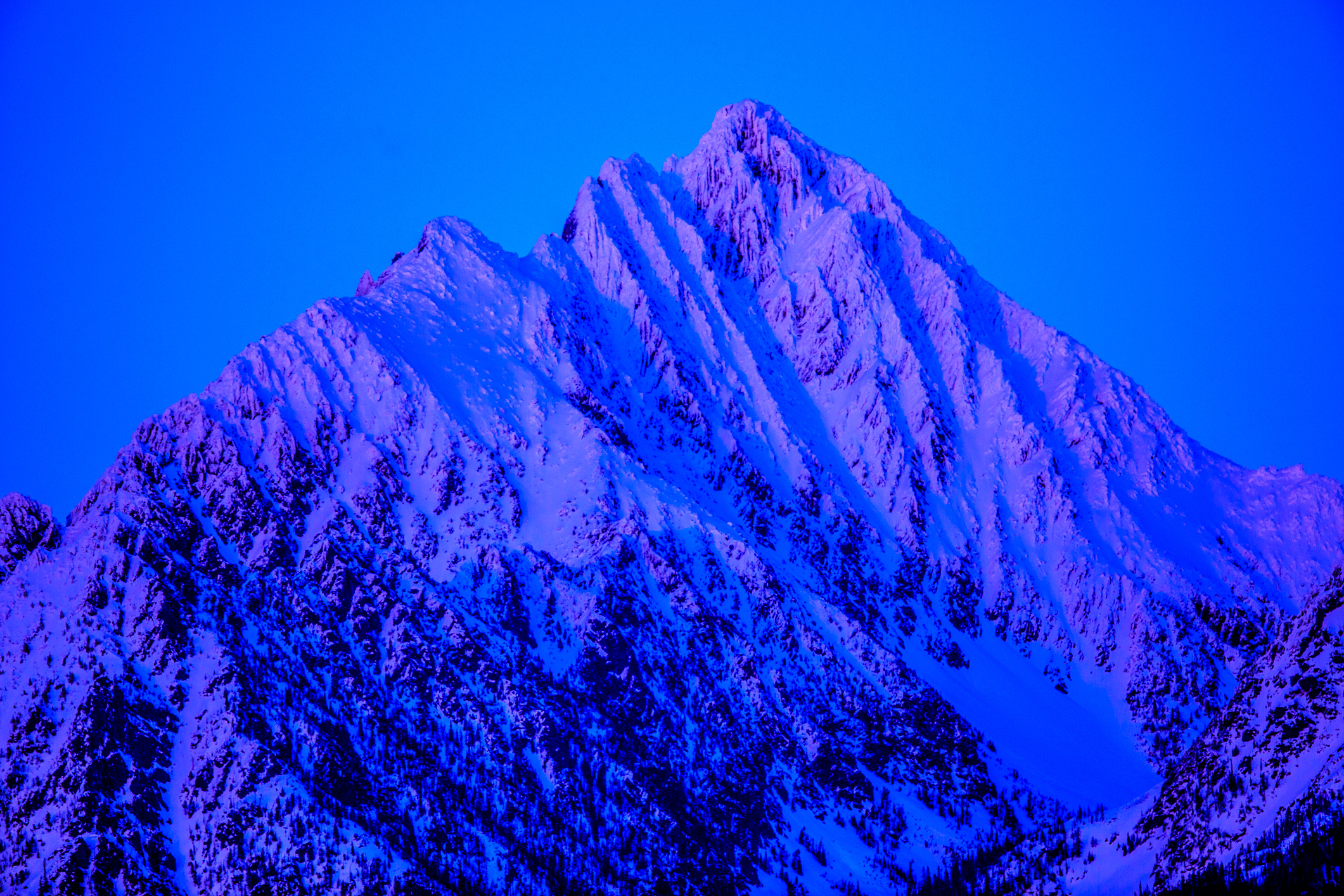
Alpenglow on Mount Fisher

== See also ==
- Geography of British Columbia
