= Maskepetoon =

- Born: c.1807
- Died: 1869
- Occupations: Cree leader Warrior

Maskepetoon (c. 1807 – 1869) was a Cree leader and warrior. He was a highly respected peace-maker, due to his negotiation of truces between the Cree and other First Nations. Grant MacEwan described him as the "Gandhi of the Plains."

== Early life ==
It has been said by historian Hugh Dempsey that even during Maskepetoon's youth, he was an intelligent child and showed leadership. After leaving the care of his mother, Maskepetoon began to study the necessary skills of hunting and trapping.

In the early to mid 1820s, his tribe struggled with starvation as well as ongoing conflict. This meant that Maskepetoon would have had to take up the role of a soldier, being put in positions of guarding the camp and scouting for any potential threats. Dempsey has also noted that Maskepetoon eventually chose peace over war following a visit to a holy man. He said to have been spoken to by his father on the issue, his father telling him that he did not have to choose war. Despite being spoken to several times, Maskepetoon rejected his talk of peace. However, the talks with his father began to bother him, so he visited a holy man who laid out two paths for Maskepetoon, war or peace. Following these words with the holy man, Maskepetoon had finally found peace to be the favorable choice. Throughout his life, Maskepetoon married an estimated four times.

Born during a time of fluctuating war and peace for his tribe, the year before his birth there was a breakdown in Cree-Blackfoot relations. This breakdown in relations resulted in a conflict between the Cree and various other First Nations—Peigan, Siksika and Blood—as well as the Blackfoot.

Hugh Dempsey states, "The people remembered that even as a child, Maskepetoon showed leadership." During youth, the Cree children engaged in games that not only had the purpose of being enjoyable, but preparing them for their impending adulthood. These games were ones that involved the development of skills that they would later use during potential conflict. Two examples show how the young Cree members gained skills in combat and improved their proficiency with bows and arrows. The first was a game of "war" which essentially consisted of two teams arming themselves with sticks, mud and even stones. The aim of the game was to use the stick to hurl mud at the other team until one team eventually retreated. Similar to this was another game called itachikan. In this, one boy would fire his arrow as far as possible and the aim of the game was for the rest of the players to get as close to it as they could. The winner would then be the one who got their arrow closest to the target.

It is said by Hugh Dempsey that the Rocky Mountain band of Cree were "generally peaceful." He does however continue by saying "they took up arms to defend their camps or respond to an insult, and their young people were not averse to raiding an enemy in order to gain the prestige that came with being a warrior." While mostly a peaceful tribe, the Cree that Dempsey discusses, did have instances during which it became necessary to use violence. Along with this, the younger Cree were also not shy of getting involved due to the recognition they would receive from aiding and assisting their tribe.

After developing these skills during his childhood, Maskepetoon continued to learn and grow even more as he grew older. Hugh Dempsey says, "As he grew up, Maskepetoon learned to walk silently in the woods..." and continues by adding, "He could sense a change in the weather, particularly in winter. He had to, for his life depended on it." This shows that even as a teenager, Maskepetoon was already well trained in the skills he would need for later life during potential conflicts that may occur. Dempsey believes that Maskepetoon went on his first proper outing in 1821, when he was just 14 years old.

== Adult life ==
Maskepetoon – as Hugh Dempsey mentions – had at least three brothers. His youngest brother, Samson said of his brothers, "My brother [Maskepetoon] was killed by the Blackfeet, another by the Stonies, and another by the Cree; thus you will see we were not only at war with other tribes, but fought among ourselves." Dempsey also notes that there are few testimonies written regarding Maskepetoon's fighting ability, however, some were kept in oral history. A Missionary who knew Maskepetoon, George McDougall, tells a story of the Cree Chief's combat skills by saying, "Once attacked by three Blackfeet...he rushed upon them with his knife and despatched the whole." It of course remains to be questioned whether or not this is fact or fiction but if true, it proves the immense skill that Maskepetoon held as a warrior.

Later in life he, of course, turned from war to peace-making. This is said by John McDougall to have been influenced by his father's words. His father said while Maskepetoon was revelling in the glory of his accomplishments in battle,

The glory you are now seeking will be short-lived. Delighting in war, taking pleasure in the spilling of man's blood, is all wrong. If you want to be a great man, if you want to be remembered long, turn about and work for peace. This is the only thing that will give you true fame.

While Dempsey says that his father spoke to him six times regarding the notion of seeking peace rather than bloodshed, it was not until Maskepetoon turned to a holy man for guidance that he truly realised the importance of peace over war. However, Dempsey later goes on to say that this is likely more fiction than reality as it was told by Methodist Missionaries during their travels in eastern Canada. This is due to the depiction that seems to tell of Maskepetoon as "an ideal Christian."

During the time of the smallpox epidemic, the Rocky Mountain Cree did not come into contact with it until it was nearing its end. The disease eventually reached them in the winter of 1837-1838 but during this time, a majority of the Cree were away from the camps trapping. The Cree outside of the camp, including Maskepetoon, were told of deaths occurring amongst the Rocky Mountain Cree and on the plains but stayed safe by continuing to live in the woods and working. The result of this was Maskepetoon and his fellow Cree emerging unscathed from the danger which had all but passed them by.

In the time following the smallpox epidemic of 1837, the Blackfoot moved to a different area as their tribe faced heavy losses in the face of the disease. Due to the relocation that the Blackfoot exercised, this gave more freedom to the Rocky Mountain Cree in the way of exploration of the plains. This period of time also saw opportunity arise for Maskepetoon to exemplify himself as a worthy and wise leader, with an aim of helping those with no leader who could potentially guide them, as well as provide protection.

It was not until the late 1840s and early 1850s that Maskepetoon became recognised as a well renowned leader of the Rocky Mountain Crees. In his role as leader of the Cree band, his duties included; areas to hunt, destinations to travel to, as well as informing the Cree how the camp was to be protected. Maskepetoon earned respect from his fellow people as a skilled hunter, as well as his generosity and wisdom. Hugh Dempsey says of Maskepetoon, "He welcomed visitors to his lodge, honoured them and presented them with gifts on their departure."

Maskepetoon's love for alcohol has also been reported, most likely due to the fact that when he drank he often became somewhat out of control. Dempsey's book mentions such events.

In 1845, he almost killed Baptiste Brenow while they were drinking at Whitemud Creek, and a year later he slapped a man while the Indians were trading at Fort Edmonton. On another occasion, he attempted to scalp his favourite wife, Sussewisk, during a drunken rage.

Makepetoon assisted the Palliser expedition. "In 1857 he was engaged by John Palliser’s expedition to act as guide from the Qu’Appelle lakes (near Fort Qu’Appelle) to the elbow of the South Saskatchewan River (near Elbow); from the expedition’s members he acquired the name Nichiwa, the Cree term for “friend.”"

== Death ==
Following a series of altercations between the Cree and Siksika, which had resulted in deaths for each, it was widely reported that the Siksika were seeking peace. Despite this, a Cree historian – David Ahenakew – said, "There were many who did not want a truce." Hugh Dempsey adds to this by saying, "They wanted revenge for the recent killings." However, Maskepetoon and his band were adamant in resolving things peacefully. The camp they entered had recently been put under the leadership of a Siksika Supreme Chief named Many Swans. Many Swans was known for being a vicious and unsympathetic leader. This made it very unlikely that Maskepetoon's peace efforts would stand a chance of working. Regardless of Many Swans' feelings towards traders and his lack of mercy, his people still willingly followed him confidently. Whether this was due to his violent tendencies or perhaps him being a very strong leader, it does not matter, they were going to follow him whatever the case. This would not have been the first instance of his people following his commands no matter how brutal. One of Many Swans' wives had left him for a Blood Indian. He did not like this and following being granted permission to kill her, his brother rode to the camp of the Blood Indians and murdered her.

Awaiting their meeting with the Siksika's, Maskepetoon's party, including himself, had dressed in their best clothes. They laid out a flag and beneath it they all sat with a Bible, pipe and tobacco, as was tradition in peace-making situations. As Many Swans approached he displayed the universal sign for peace, holding his hands in front of him with his hands clasped together before telling the Cree that there was to be a truce. In showing this peace gesture, the Cree believed that this was a sincere act and upon being asked to disarm, they followed the proposal and laid down their weapons. Following this, in an act of betrayal, Many Swans gather all of the weapons and rode off while shouting to his warriors, "Go ahead! Shoot and kill them!" Dempsey continues this by saying that in a matter of just a few minutes, all of the Cree peace-making party were dead, including Maskepetoon. Running Calf, a young member of Many Swans' band, has been named as the one who killed Maskepetoon. This however was not the end of the situation. John McDougall says not only were their clothes stolen,

Not satisfied with [the death of Maskepetoon] the Blackfeet dismembered and severed the old hero's body, limb from limb and dragged these at their horses' tails into their camp.

Maskepetoon, the respected warrior and peace-maker, was 62 at the time of his death. After the news of Maskepetoon's death, it was strikingly clear how greatly this had impacted his followers, as well as the Methodists he had come into contact with. Upon learning of his death, John McDougall wrote a piece that expressed his sense of loss as well as the nations loss.

The death of our old Chief is regarded by both Whites and Indians as a national loss. He was a staunch Protestant, a friend of the white man, and exerted more influence than any other Chief east of the Mountains. In two weeks from this date I had arranged to meet him and his people at camp-meeting. Many of our people from White Fish Lake, Woodville and Victoria, have already started for the appointed place; but he who would have sat as Chief in our Council is gone. I cannot tell you how deeply my own mind is afflicted. The poor Crees are paralysed. May the blessed God overrule this great calamity for His own glory and the good of a suffering people.

In addition to this, Thomas Woolsey – a former mentor of Maskepetoon – was given the news of his fate he also expressed a deep sense of loss.

I can assure you that the mournful intelligence we have received regarding my old friend, the Cree Chief (Maskepetoon) and his family, has been pursued with feeling of unutterable grief. I had the honor of being most intimately acquainted with the aged chieftain during my lengthened sojourn in the Saskatchewan Valley.

These accounts concerning Maskepetoon describe his impact on both the Cree and other groups. The passing of Maskepetoon was viewed as a loss, and the descriptions written about him reflect the respect he received.
