= George T. Inkster =

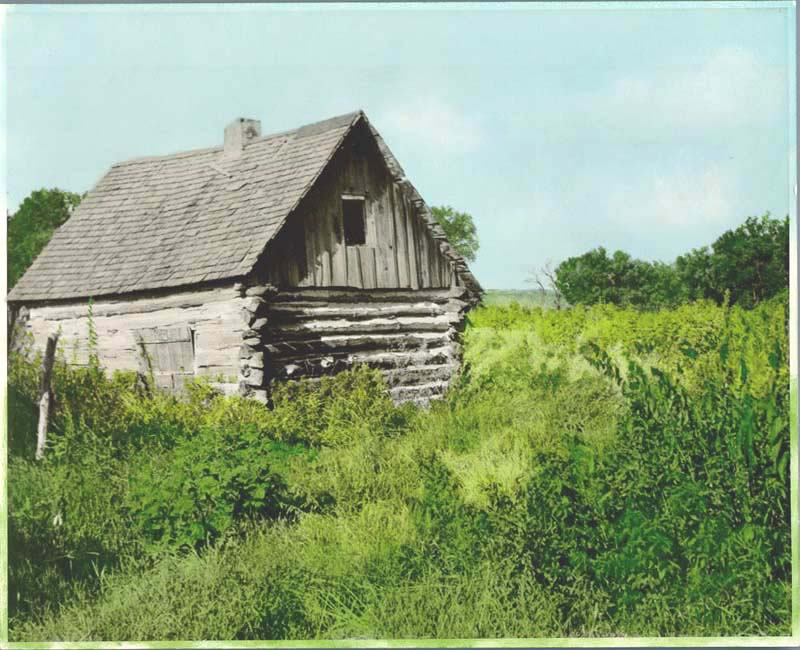
Inkster's 1878 log cabin in the vicinity of what would become Inkster, North Dakota. Photograph taken in the 1910s.

George T. Inkster (1848–1901) was a Canadian-born American pioneer in the Red River Valley of what's now North Dakota, and a participant in the Klondike Gold Rush.

Inkster was born in West Kildonan, Manitoba, Canada, and worked as a trader for the Hudson's Bay Company. He moved to the Dakota Territory of the United States in 1878, and was the first white settler in what was to become Inkster, North Dakota, building a log cabin on squatted land. He moved to what's now Towner County, North Dakota in 1882 to farm, and married Caroline Chercote in 1895. He went to Yukon, Canada in 1897 to join the Klondike Gold Rush, but later returned to Towner, where he died in 1901.
