= Inkster, North Dakota =

- City
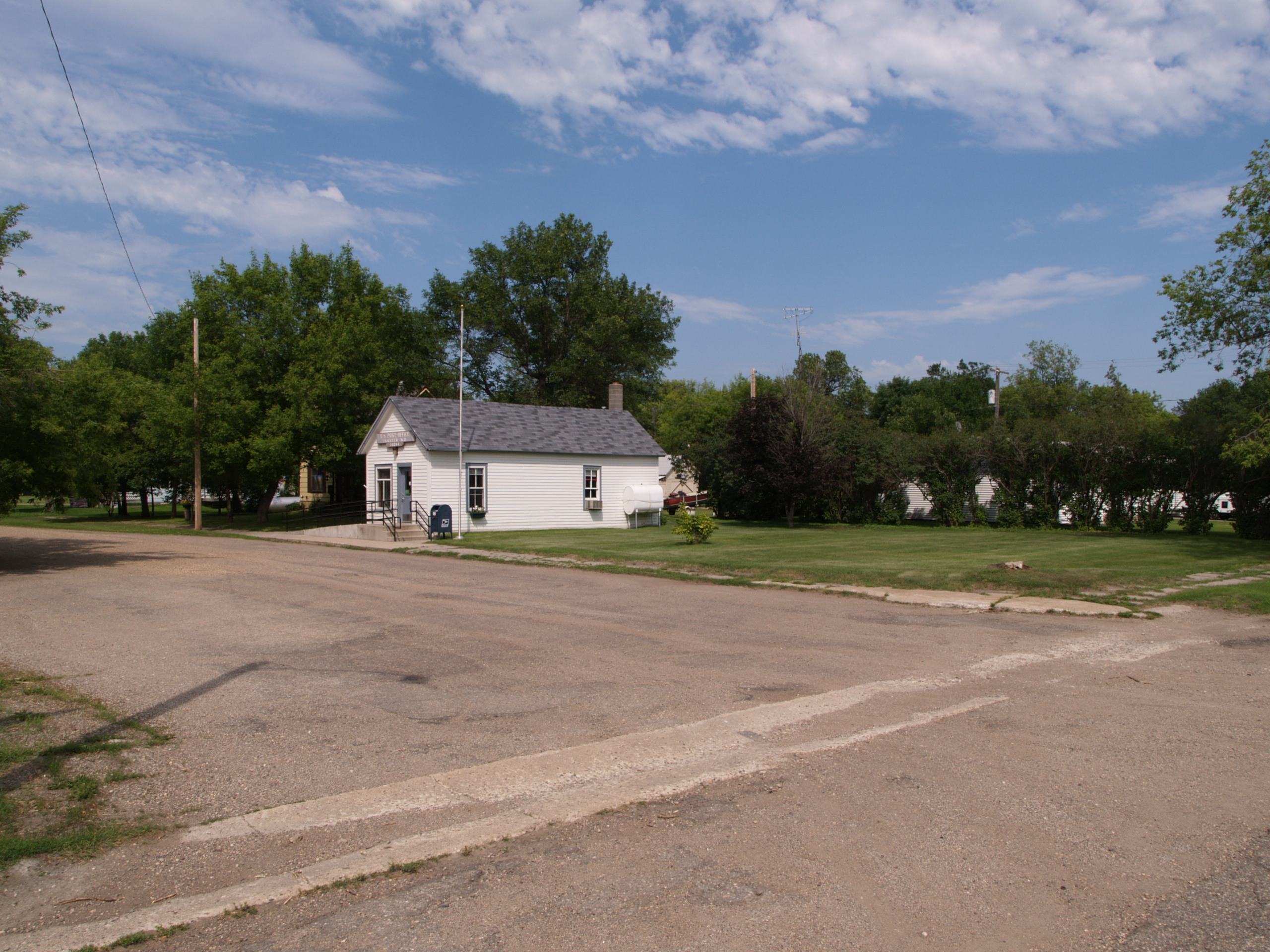
- The post office in Inkster

- Location of Inkster, North Dakota
- Coordinates: 48°09′05″N 97°38′39″W
- Country: United States
- State: North Dakota
- County: Grand Forks
- Metro: Greater Grand Forks
- Founded: 1884

Area
  - Total: 1.00 sq mi (2.58 km^{2})
  - Land: 1.00 sq mi (2.58 km^{2})
  - Water: 0 sq mi (0.00 km^{2})
- Elevation: 1,020 ft (310 m)

Population (2020)
  - Total: 38
  - Estimate (2022): 38
  - Density: 38.2/sq mi (14.76/km^{2})
- Time zone: UTC-6 (Central (CST))
  - Summer (DST): UTC-5 (CDT)
- ZIP code: 58244
- Area code: 701
- FIPS code: 38-39980
- GNIS feature ID: 1036099

Inkster is a city in Grand Forks County, North Dakota, United States, with a population of 38 as of the 2020 census. Inkster was founded in 1884, in an area that had been settled by George T. Inkster in 1878.

== Geography ==
According to the United States Census Bureau, the city has a total area of 1.00 square mile (2.59 km^{2}), all land.

It is part of the Grand Forks, ND-MN Metropolitan Statistical Area" or "Greater Grand Forks".

== Demographics ==
Historical population
Census	Pop.	Note	%±
1890	211		—
1910	353		—
1920	368		4.2%
1930	257		−30.2%
1940	310		20.6%
1950	304		−1.9%
1960	282		−7.2%
1970	198		−29.8%
1980	135		−31.8%
1990	127		−5.9%
2000	102		−19.7%
2010	50		−51.0%
2020	38		−24.0%
2022 (est.)	38		0.0%
U.S. Decennial Census; 2020 Census

=== 2010 census ===
As of the census of 2010, there were 50 people, 24 households, and 16 families living in the city. The population density was 50.0 inhabitants per square mile (19.3/km^{2}). There were 50 housing units at an average density of 50.0 per square mile (19.3/km^{2}). The racial makeup of the city was 90.0% White, 4.0% Native American, and 6.0% from two or more races.

There were 24 households, of which 16.7% had children under the age of 18 living with them, 58.3% were married couples living together, 4.2% had a female householder with no husband present, 4.2% had a male householder with no wife present, and 33.3% were non-families. 29.2% of all households were made up of individuals, and 12.5% had someone living alone who was 65 years of age or older. The average household size was 2.08 and the average family size was 2.50.

The median age in the city was 53 years. 16% of residents were under the age of 18; 2% were between the ages of 18 and 24; 20% were from 25 to 44; 40% were from 45 to 64; and 22% were 65 years of age or older. The gender makeup of the city was 56.0% male and 44.0% female.

=== 2000 census ===
As of the census of 2000, there were 102 people, 45 households, and 28 families living in the city. The population density was 102.5 inhabitants per square mile (39.6/km^{2}). There were 55 housing units at an average density of 55.3 per square mile (21.4/km^{2}). The racial makeup of the city was 98.04% White, and 1.96% from two or more races.

There were 45 households, out of which 24.4% had children under the age of 18 living with them, 55.6% were married couples living together, 8.9% had a female householder with no husband present, and 35.6% were non-families. 33.3% of all households were made up of individuals, and 24.4% had someone living alone who was 65 years of age or older. The average household size was 2.27 and the average family size was 2.93.

In the city, the population was spread out, with 22.5% under the age of 18, 8.8% from 18 to 24, 24.5% from 25 to 44, 20.6% from 45 to 64, and 23.5% who were 65 years of age or older. The median age was 42 years. For every 100 females, there were 104.0 males. For every 100 females age 18 and over, there were 107.9 males.

The median income for a household in the city was $24,107, and the median income for a family was $27,083. Males had a median income of $23,750 versus $20,625 for females. The per capita income for the city was $12,719. There were 10.3% of families and 15.5% of the population living below the poverty line, including 24.1% of under eighteens and 25.0% of those over 64.

== Education ==
It is within the Midway Public School District 128.

== Notable people ==
- John Silas Lundy, physician and anesthesiologist
