= Kootenay Ranges =

Subrange of the Continental Ranges in British Columbia, Canada

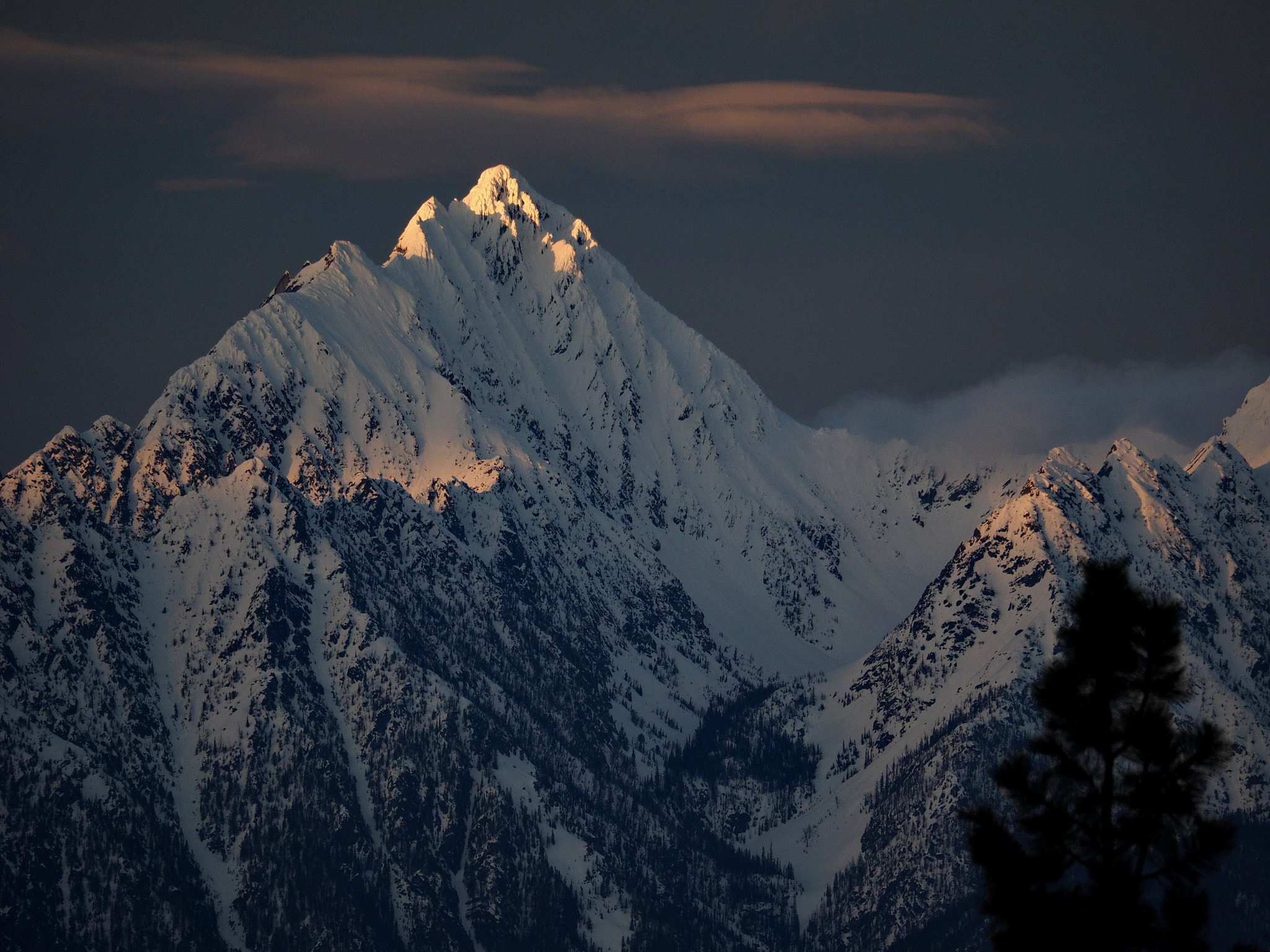
- Mt. Fisher in the Hughes Range

Dimensions
- Area: 4,940 km^{2} (1,910 mi^{2})

Geography
- Location within British Columbia
- Country: Canada
- Province: British Columbia
- Range coordinates: 50°29′59″N 115°50′03″W
- Parent range: Continental Ranges
- Topo map: NTS 82J5 Fairmont Hot Springs

The Kootenay Ranges, also known as the Western Ranges, are one of the three main subdivisions of the Continental Ranges which comprise the southern half of the Canadian Rockies, the other two subdivisions being the Front Ranges and the Park Ranges (which is the largest of the groupings). The Kootenay Ranges lie between the Bull River (E) and the town of Golden, British Columbia (W) and south of Kicking Horse Pass, and are the location of the headwaters of the Kootenay River

== Subranges ==
- Beaverfoot Range
- Brisco Range
- Hughes Range
- Stanford Range
- Van Nostrand Range
