= William Sinclair (fur trader) =

William Sinclair (b. c. 1794 – 12 October 1868) was a chief factor of the Hudson's Bay Company. He was a brother of James Sinclair and his father, also William Sinclair, founded the first fort at Oxford House.

William was four when his father was building the HBC post at Oxford House and he joined the company there in 1808 and worked in that district until 1816 when he was called to the company headquarters in Britain. Weather forced them to winter in James Bay and his resourcefulness in these trying circumstances furthered his career.

Sinclair was an important part of the Bow River expedition of 1822–23 led by Donald McKenzie who was Governor of the Red River Colony and an explorer/fur trader. The trek was to the forks of the South Saskatchewan and Red Deer rivers. He added an 850-mile side trip on this occasion, along with John Edward Harriott, to the Cypress Hills and Missouri country.

William Sinclair's career became increasingly filled with important tasks and he was regarded as a valued officer of the Hudson's Bay Company.
