= Hughes Range (British Columbia) =

Mountain range in British Columbia, Canada

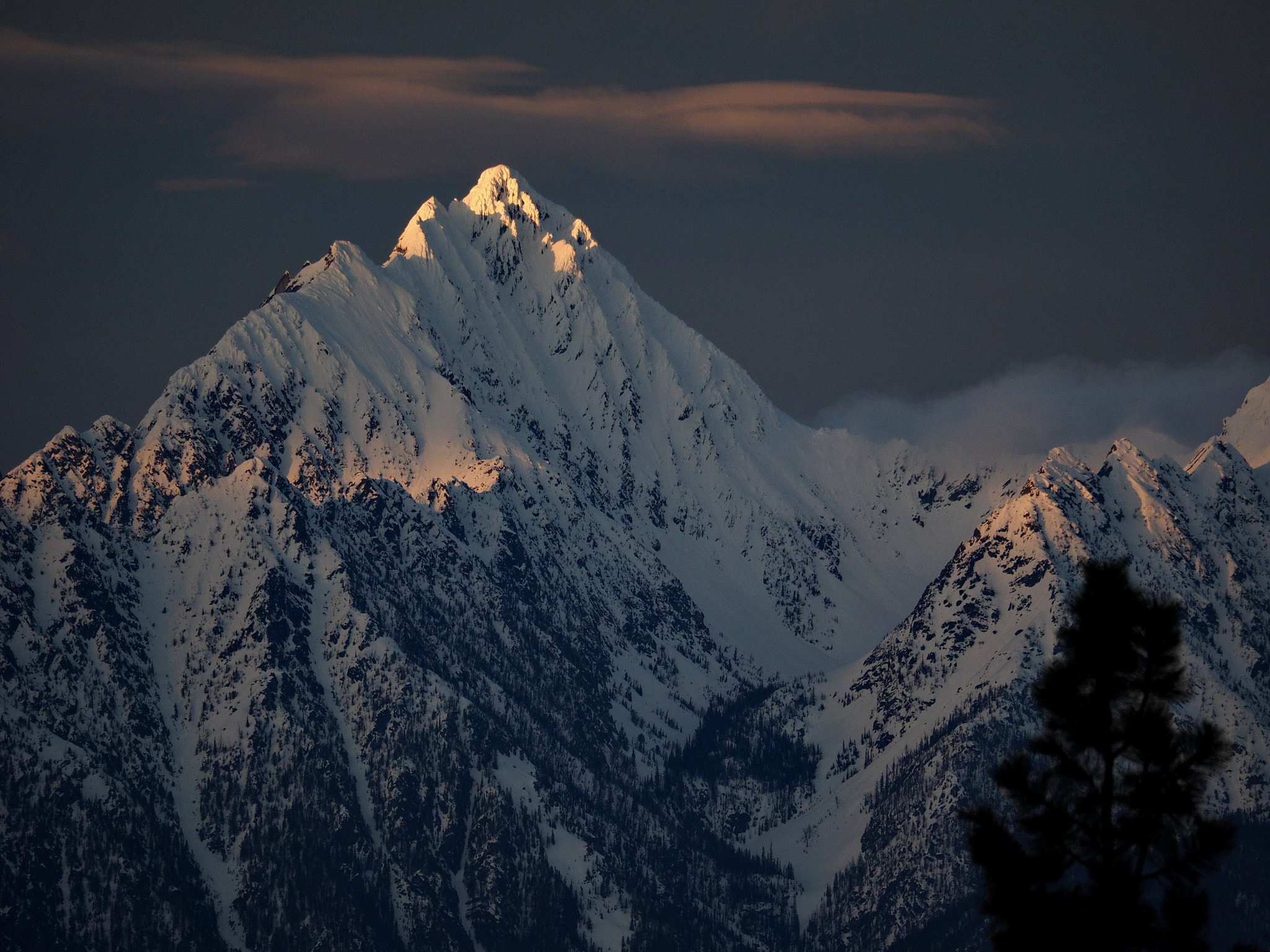
- Mount Fisher

Highest point
- Peak: Mount Fisher
- Elevation: 2,843 m (9,327 ft)
- Prominence: 873 m (2,864 ft)
- Listing: Mountains of British Columbia
- Coordinates: 49°38′47″N 115°29′04″W

Dimensions
- Area: 765 km^{2} (295 mi^{2})

Geography
- Location within British Columbia
- Country: Canada
- Province: British Columbia
- Range coordinates: 49°37′59″N 115°28′03″W
- Parent range: Kootenay Ranges
- Topo map: NTS 82G11 Fernie

The Hughes Range is a subrange of the Kootenay Ranges, located between the Bull and White rivers in the Kootenay Land District, British Columbia, Canada.
