= South Oak Bay =

Neighbourhood in Vancouver Island, British Columbia

Coordinates: 48.418°N 123.312°W

South Oak Bay is a neighbourhood in Oak Bay, British Columbia, Canada, located to the south of Oak Bay Avenue and lying east of the boundary between Oak Bay and Victoria, British Columbia.

== History ==
The neighbourhood was originally the territory of the Songhees aboriginal people who lived generally in the southeastern part of what is today Greater Victoria. In the mid-19th century the land that today comprises South Oak Bay was divided between Isabella Ross, Joseph Despard Pemberton and William Henry McNeill. The McNeill property was located between present day McNeill Avenue and McNeill or Shoal Bay

One of the early buildings in the neighbourhood was the Mount Baker Hotel, built in 1893 on Beach Drive and looking toward Mount Baker, Washington. South Oak Bay remains primarily residential, with a large area of the neighbourhood forming part of the Victoria Golf Club. Residential development followed the arrival of the streetcar, including the B.C. Electric line in 1890. Windsor Park was established in 1890 as the Oak Bay Recreation Park. The Victoria Golf Club, was founded in 1893. In 1895 the Victoria Railway and Electric Lighting Company established a bicycle racing track at what is now Windsor Park to encourage use of the streetcar system. Although residential development began in the early 20th century, much of the housing dates from the period between 1920 and 1970.

The Oak Bay breakwater was built in 1959 funded by the federal government, Oak Bay Marina was opened in 1964, and replaced the Oak Bay Boat House built in 1893.

=== Chinese Cemetery at Harling Point ===
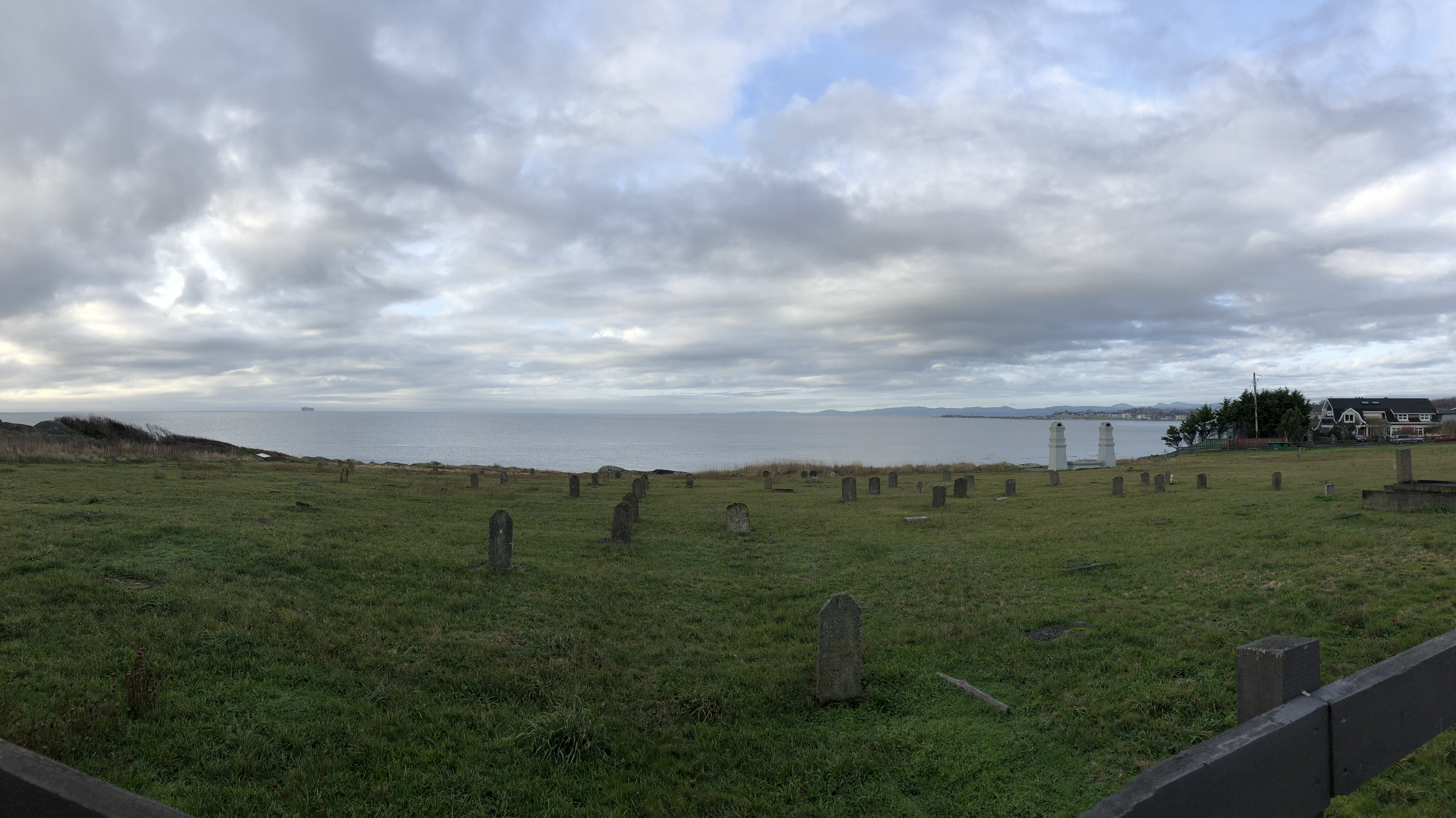
View of Chinese Cemetery (taken November 2020, from Penzance Road, facing Haro Strait on Harling Point, Victoria, British Columbia)

In 1903 the Chinese Consolidate Benevolent Association in Victoria purchased land at Harling Point for a cemetery. Between 1903 and 1908 Chinese graves in the Ross Bay Cemetery were opened, the bodies exhumed and transferred to the Chinese Cemetery about 2 km (1 mi) away. The Cemetery remained in use until the 1950s when it was closed. In 1996 the Federal Government of Canada declared the Chinese Cemetery at Harling Point a National Historic Site.

== South Oak Bay today ==
There is a small commercial area on Central Avenue at St. Patrick, and another grouping of commercial premises near the intersection of Windsor Avenue and Newport Avenue, near the Oak Bay Marina. Municipal parks in the neighbourhood include Anderson Hill Park, Lafayette Park and Windsor Park. The Capital Regional District also maintains a park in the neighbourhood, Gonzales Hill Park.

The neighbourhood's public elementary school, Monterey Elementary, became a middle school in 2006. St. Michael's University School Junior School campus is located on Victoria Avenue.

== Notable institutions ==
- Oak Bay Marina
- Victoria Golf Club
- Oak Bay Beach Hotel
