= Sealand of the Pacific =

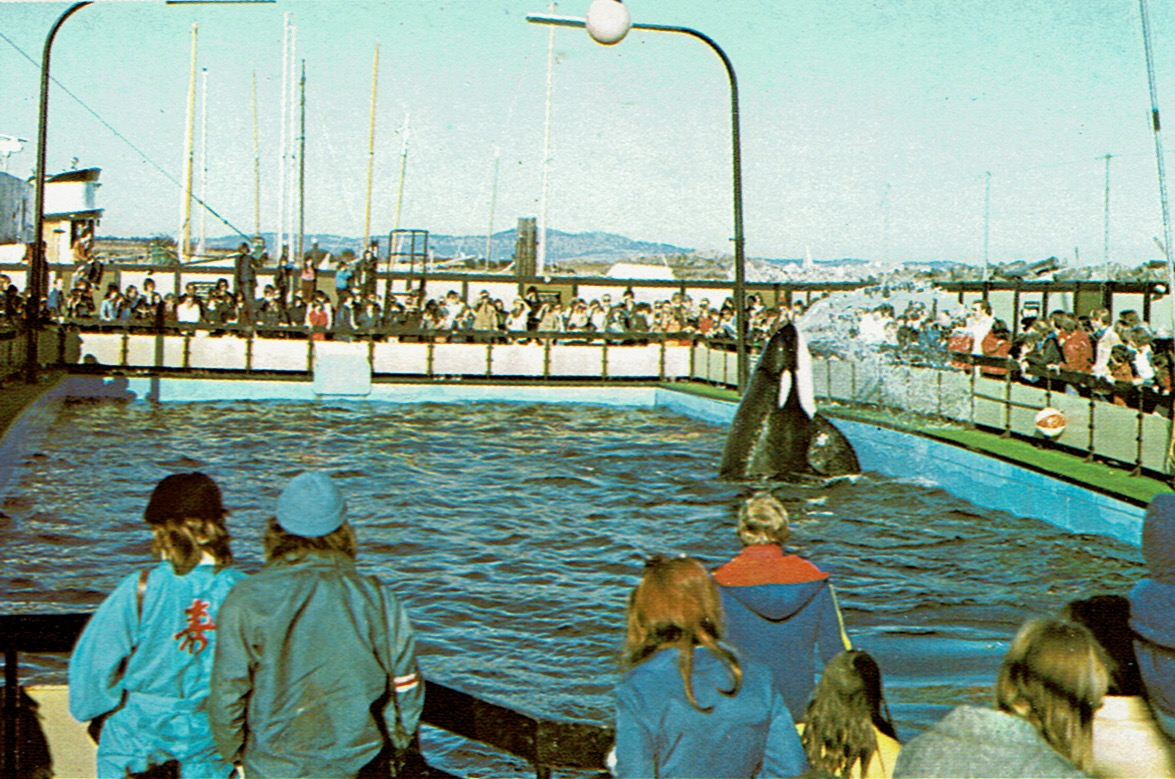
- A show at the Sealand of the Pacific aquarium in May, 1979.
- Interactive map of Sealand of the Pacific
- 48.4249°N 123.3018°W
- Date opened: May 17, 1969; 57 years ago
- Date closed: November 1992; 33 years ago
- Location: Victoria, British Columbia, Canada

Sealand of the Pacific was a public aquarium in South Oak Bay at the Oak Bay Marina, near the city of Victoria in British Columbia, Canada. In 1991 a trainer, Keltie Byrne, was killed by three of its orcas, Haida II, Nootka IV, and Tilikum. The aquarium subsequently closed and sold its orcas to SeaWorld.

== History ==
The aquarium opened in 1969, housing an orca named Haida which had been captured in 1968. Shortly afterward, the aquarium decided to capture a mate for him, and four members of a pod of Bigg's killer whales were caught on March 1, 1970, off the coast of Pedder Bay near Victoria. Two of the orcas, Chimo and Nootka, were brought to Sealand. Nootka was later sold, and moved through several aquariums before dying in California. Chimo died in 1972, a little over 2 years after her capture; she was originally thought to be albino because of her white colour, but it was later discovered that she had Chediak-Hegashi Syndrome, which made her very susceptible to illness. In 1973, Sealand captured an older female whale to be Haida's new mate, and named her Nootka II in honour of her predecessor. Nootka II, however, died after 9 months. Haida's third mate, Nootka III, was also short-lived, and Haida, who had mourned each of his mates and had been displaying signs of depression, remained alone for the next five years.

In 1977, Dr. Murray Newman, founding director of the Vancouver Aquarium, got a call from Campbell River, B.C., resident William Davis, who claimed he was feeding a sick baby killer whale by hand in the wild. Newman then called Dr Michael Bigg, head of Marine Mammal Research at the Pacific Biological Station in Nanaimo, B.C. Bigg, in turn, called Sealand and Bob Wright, who took Angus Mathews, Dr. Alan Hoey, and Bigg by float plane to Menzies Bay to investigate the claim. They discovered the story was true and that the baby killer whale was suffering from a bullet wound. Sealand, with permission from Bigg and Davis, decided to rescue the baby whale, who they named "Miracle," and take her back to Victoria for emergency care. Due to her young age, exposure to human attention, and the unknown location of her family pod, Fisheries and Oceans of Canada deemed her "unable to be released," and she was therefore given to Sealand in 1978 as a third resort, after the Ministry of Fisheries and the Vancouver Aquarium were unable to take her in.

Miracle became a popular attraction, and even though she was kept in a separate pen from Haida, the two would often try to call out and talk to each other. Several years later, Miracle's companion in her pen, a seal named Shadow, drowned in the nets forming the pen. Sealand diver Larry McInerney stated in the documentary Who Killed Miracle? that she had drowned by becoming trapped between the double-net system at the aquarium. McInerney also noted, which was corroborated by Alexandra Morton in the film, that Miracle had learned that by damaging the nets, divers would come into pen and she could play with the divers. Miracle's play had become aggressive and was a safety problem for the divers, preventing proper maintenance of the pens. Dr. Lance Barrett-Lennard, a killer whale expert, determined that Miracle was a southern resident killer whale, which were known to play rough with other sea mammals in the wild. These factors combined to cause the seal's death, and contributed to Miracle's own death by drowning not long after.

As anti-captivity protests began to put pressure on aquariums, Sealand agreed to release Haida, but he died a few days before his scheduled release in October 1982, with no evidence of foul play. His release had been part of a plan for the aquarium to acquire new whales. Many people were outraged by the plan of capturing more whales and staged a protest at the supposed capture site. Sealand soon obtained three whales captured from Iceland.

The three new orcas, Tilikum, Nootka IV, and Haida II, never had good dynamics together; the male, Tilikum, was often bullied and chased into the medical pen by the two females.

== 1991 accident and closure ==
On 20 February 1991, Keltie Byrne, a 20-year-old marine biology student and part-time orca trainer, was dragged into the whale pool after a show. Tilikum, Nootka IV, and Haida II dragged and repeatedly submerged her until she drowned, despite other trainers' efforts to rescue her. The poor relations between the whales, unfamiliarity with trainers in the water, and the pregnancy of at least one of the females (Haida II) were cited as possible causes.

Sealand of the Pacific closed shortly after the incident, in November 1992. All three of the whales were sold to SeaWorld in the United States. Tilikum and Nootka IV went to SeaWorld Orlando, while Haida II and her baby Kyuquot went to SeaWorld San Antonio. Kyuquot remains in captivity at SeaWorld. Haida II died in August 2001, while Nootka IV died in 1994. Tilikum died in January 2017.

== Orcas kept at Sealand ==
- Haida
- Chimo: An orca with Chediak-Hegashi Syndrome. Captured in March 1970 and died in 1972.
- Knootka/Nootka: An orca captured alongside Chimo in March 1970. Lived at Sealand until the twenty-fifth of that month, when she was moved to the Japanese Deer Park in California. From 1971 to 1972 Knootka was residing at a Texan park named "Seven Seas Texas." She would go on to live at Marineland of Canada until 1986, and SeaWorld San Diego, where she spent the final four years of her life. She died on March 13, 1990.
- Nootka II
- Nootka III
- Miracle: Died January 1982.
- Haida II: Died on August 1, 2001. She was pregnant at the time of the 1991 drowning of Keltie Byrne; she gave birth to a son named Kyuquot on December 14, 1991.
- Nootka IV: Died on September 13, 1994, at SeaWorld Orlando.
- Tilikum: Died on January 6, 2017, at SeaWorld Orlando.
- Kyuquot: The first offspring of Tilikum, mothered by Haida II. Currently lives at SeaWorld San Antonio.
- Nootka IV's calf: The calf was born on February 4, 1992, and died March 10, 1992.

== See also ==
- Killer whale attack
