= Frances Simpson (disambiguation) =

Frances Simpson (c. 1857–1926) was an English writer, cat show judge, and cat breeder.

Frances Simpson may also refer to:

- Frances Ramsay Simpson (c. 1812–1853), English diarist
- Frances Simpson Stevens (1894–1976), American painter

== See also ==
- Francis Simpson, or Nuke, a Marvel Comics character
