= Isobel Graham Finlayson =

English-born diarist and artist

Isobel Graham Finlayson (January 20, 1811 – August 22, 1890) was an English-born diarist and artist. Her diary is one of the few accounts written by a European woman about travel associated with the North American fur trade.

The daughter of Geddes Mackenzie Simpson, a London merchant with close ties to the Hudson's Bay Company, and Frances Hume Hawkins, she was born Isobel Graham Simpson in London.

In 1838, she married Duncan Finlayson, the governor of Assiniboia which was also known as the Red River Colony. Her husband left for Rupert's Land in the spring of 1839 but, because of her health, she did not follow him until the summer of that year. She described her journey in a diary, which also included sketches of First Nations people. In 1844, her husband was transferred to Lachine. After her sister Frances died in Lachine in 1853, she helped look after her brother-in-law's family. When her husband retired in 1859, the couple settled in London.

Finlayson died at home in London at the age of 79.

Her brother Wemyss was a Canadian fur trader and politician. Her sister Frances was the wife of Governor George Simpson.

Excerpts from her journal were published in The Beaver in 1951.
