= Ross Bay Cemetery =

Cemetery in Vancouver Island, Canada

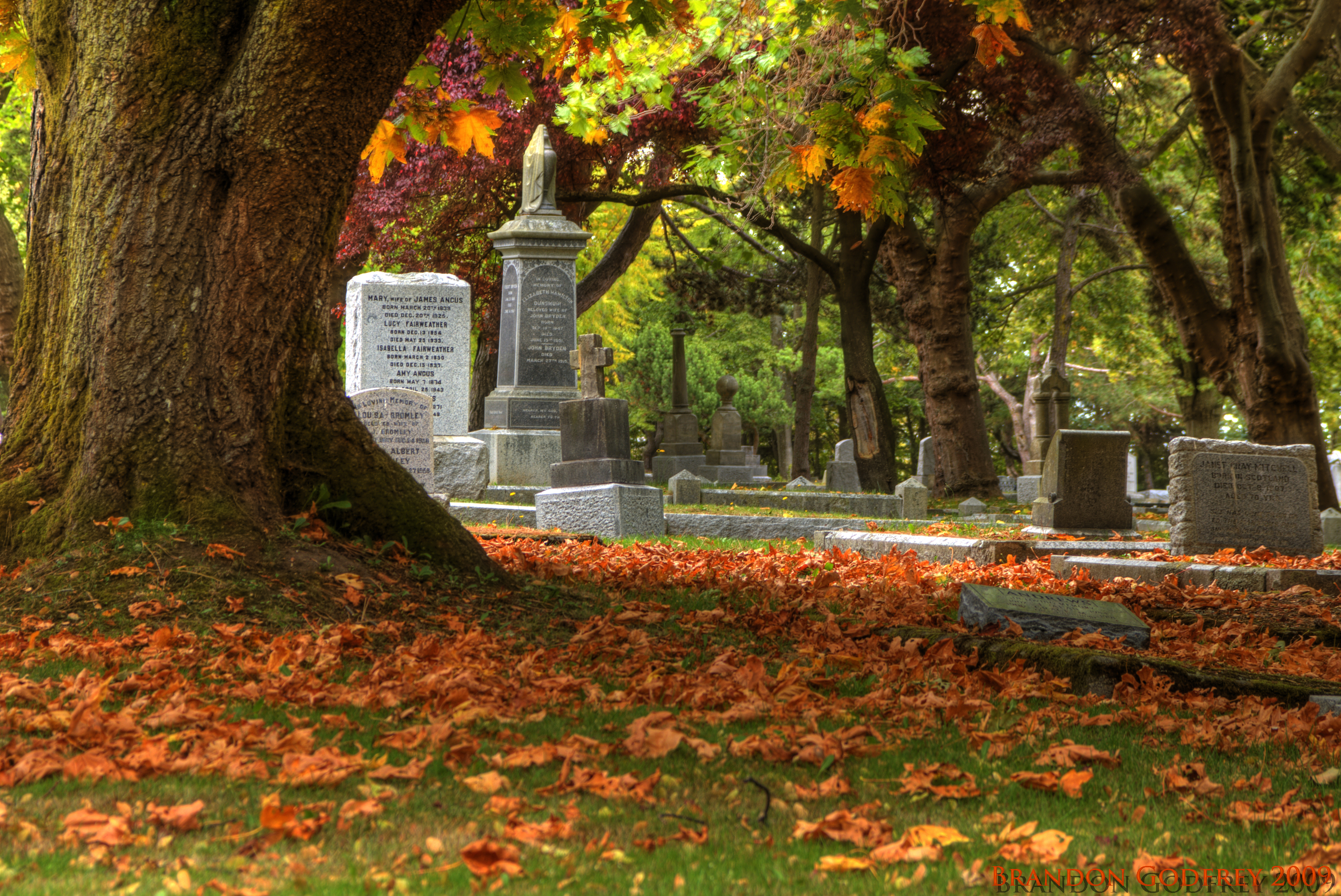
- Ross Bay Cemetery
- Interactive map of Ross Bay Cemetery

Details
- Established: 1872
- Location: Vancouver Island
- Country: Canada
- Coordinates: 48.4114°N 123.3399°W
- Type: Public (plots available by lottery)
- Size: 27.5 acres (11.1 ha)
- No. of graves: 27,000

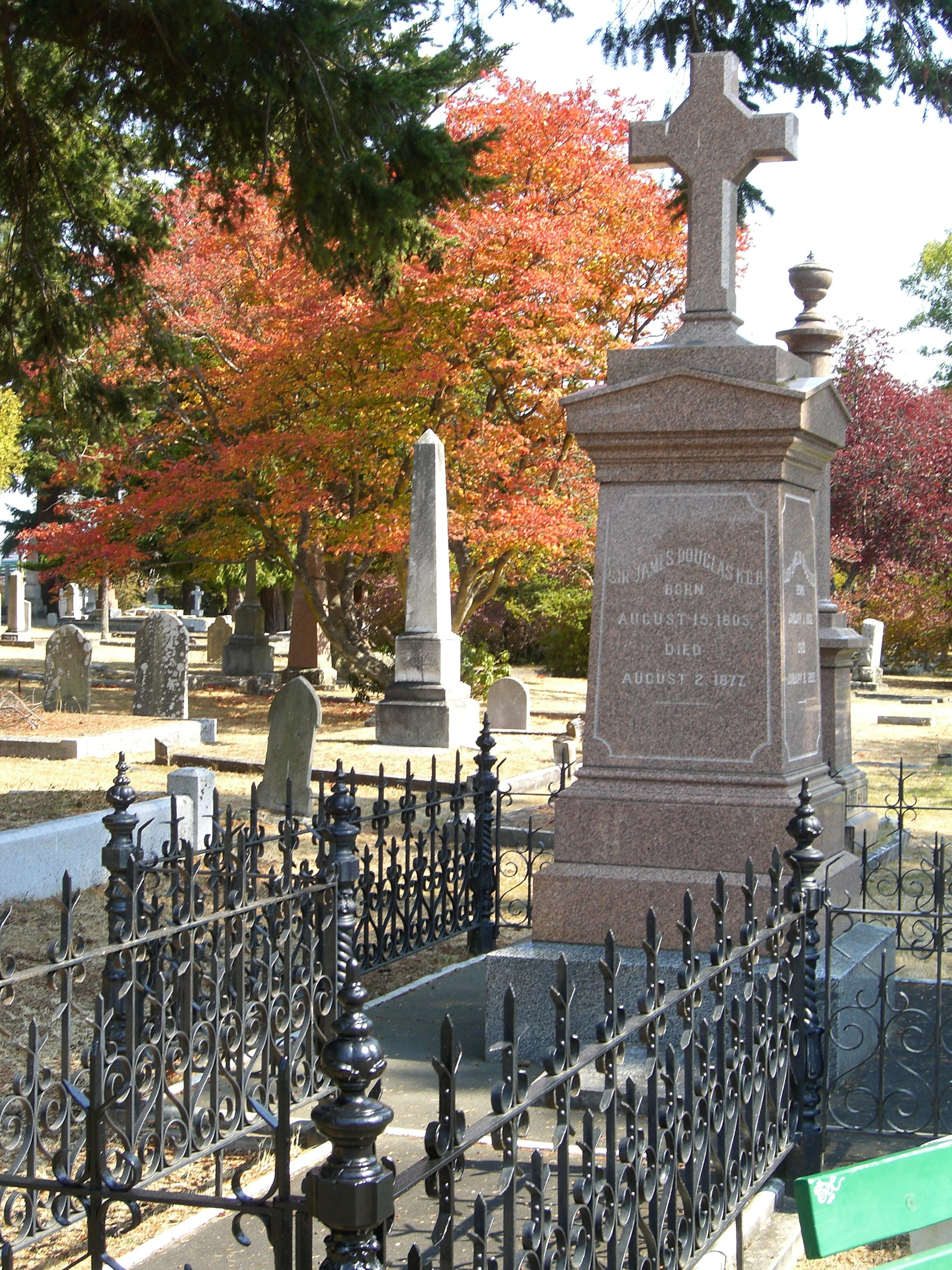
The grave of Sir James Douglas at the Ross Bay Cemetery.

Ross Bay Cemetery is located at 1516 Fairfield Road in Victoria, British Columbia, on Vancouver Island, Canada. Many historical figures from the early days of the province and colony of British Columbia are buried at Ross Bay.

== History ==
The cemetery was opened in late 1872, with the first burial being Mary Letitia (Pemberton) Pearse, wife of Benjamin Pearse. The 27.5 acre (111,000 m^{2}) cemetery is part of a public park and its south side faces Ross Bay on the Pacific Ocean. It is named after its owner, Isabella Mainville Ross, the first registered independent woman landowner in British Columbia; Isabella was also Indigenous, Anishinaabe and French Métis. Her Métis son, Alexander Ross, was buried in the cemetery in 1876. His grave marker is the only known original marker left in possession of the Old Cemeteries Society. The old wooden marker is still used as a model for heritage markers. Isabella Ross was buried across the path from Alexander in 1885. In 1994, the Old Cemeteries Society marked Isabella's grave with a heritage marker, styled after the one she chose for Alexander.

In 1911, a sea wall had to be constructed because of the severe erosion that occurred as a result of the relentless pounding of the ocean's waves. During the 1930s, the City began planting a large number of trees and today the cemetery is quite different from the original that was mainly barren ground.

The Victorian-style Ross Bay Cemetery, contains numerous elaborate mausoleums and tall pillars from the early elite. Because the city of Victoria is the capital of the province of British Columbia, until the second quarter of the 20th century when improved ferry service and air travel made mobility to and from the island much easier, most senior politicians made Victoria their permanent home. As such, Ross Bay Cemetery is the burial site for many of the province's premiers.

Although the Ross Bay Cemetery had long been considered full, the City of Victoria discovered approximately 270 unused plots in the cemetery in the late 1990s. Through a lottery process the City of Victoria sold seven of these plots in April 2004, and an additional 65 plots in February 2007. The money raised through the plot sales was used to fund refurbishment work at the Ross Bay Cemetery.

== Notable interments ==
Some of the notable personalities among the more than 27,000 interred here are:

- Billy Barker (1819–1894), frontiersman, prospector
- Sir Frank Stillman Barnard (1856–1936), statesman
- Robert Beaven (1836–1920), statesman, Premier of British Columbia
- Sir Matthew Begbie (1819–1894), First Chief Justice of British Columbia
- Harlan Carey Brewster (1870–1918), statesman, Premier of British Columbia
- Emily Carr (1871–1945), painter
- Nellie Cashman (1845–1925), nurse and gold prospector
- Sir Henry Pering Pellew Crease (1823–1905) First BC Barrister and early Supreme Court Justice
- Sarah Lindley Crease (1826–1922), artist
- Alexander Edmund Batson Davie (1847–1889), statesman, Premier of British Columbia
- Theodore Davie (1852–1898), jurist, statesman, Premier of British Columbia
- Edgar Dewdney Lieutenant Governor of British Columbia, 1892–1897.
- Amor De Cosmos (1825–1897), statesman, Premier of British Columbia
- Sir James Douglas (1803–1877), Hudson's Bay Co. executive, 1st Governor of British Columbia, and 2nd Governor of Vancouver Island
- James Dunsmuir (1851–1920), businessman, statesman, Premier of British Columbia
- Andrew Charles Elliott (1828–1889), statesman, Premier of British Columbia
- Roderick Finlayson (1818–1892), considered the "Father of Victoria."
- John Hamilton Gray (1814–1889), pre-Confederation Premier of New Brunswick, a Father of Confederation, and a BC Supreme Court Justice.
- Byron Ingemar Johnson (1890–1964), statesman, Premier of British Columbia
- Hannah Maynard (1834–1918), photographer
- Sir Richard McBride (1870–1917), statesman, Premier of British Columbia
- John McLean (c. 1799–1890), trapper, explorer, writer, sometimes credited with saving western Canada from the United States during the Alabama Claims dispute
- James E. McMillan (d. 1907), mayor of Victoria in 1872
- William Henry McNeill (1803–1875), Master of the SS Beaver from which, in 1843, while at McNeill Bay, Governor Douglas located Fort Victoria. Port McNeill is named for him.
- Joseph Despard Pemberton (1821–1893), Surveyor-General of Vancouver Island
- Sophie Pemberton (1869–1959), painter
- Edward Gawler Prior (1853–1920), statesman, Premier of British Columbia
- John Robson (1824–1892), statesman, Premier of British Columbia
- Isabella Mainville Ross (1807–1885), Anishinaabe-Métis woman and first registered independent female landowner in British Columbia
- George Anthony Walkem (1834–1908) statesman, Premier of British Columbia

== War graves ==
The cemetery contains the war graves of 135 Commonwealth service personnel, 133 from World War I and 2 from World War II.

== Cultural references ==
Ross Bay Cemetery was the alleged site of satanic rituals according to the book Michelle Remembers.

Beginning in the 1980s several extreme heavy metal bands began to use the cemetery as a gathering spot. Most famously, Blasphemy, who took a series of promotional photographs of themselves there. These bands continue to use iconography found in the cemetery as a symbol of their local scene and connection to one another.
