= Isabella Mainville Ross =

Métis businessperson (b. 1808, d. 1885)

Isabella Mainville Ross (10 January 1808 – 23 April 1885) was the first female registered landowner in British Columbia. She was a Métis woman, the daughter of Joseph and Josette Mainville.

== Early life ==
Ross's father was a French-Canadian who spent his life working for the Hudson's Bay Company (HBC). He married Josette, an Ojibwe woman. When Isabella was fourteen years old, she married Charles Ross at the HBC Fort known at the time as Lac La Pluie. This marriage was later "solemnized in an Anglican church ceremony at Fort Vancouver in the Oregon County in 1838." Ross was of Scottish descent and was born in 1794 in Kincraig, Inverness Shire, Scotland. He worked as a fur-trading clerk for HBC. Isabella and Charles had nine children, five boys and four girls: John, Walter, Elspat (Eilzabeth), Charles, Catharine, Alex, Francis, Mary and Flora.

== HBC involvement ==
Ross's job with HBC forced his family to move throughout Canada. He was "transferred to a number of locations" in Western Canada. In 1824, the family moved to Fort Kilmaurs in present day British Columbia. In the 1830s, they moved to Fort McLoughlin. They met HBC Governor George Simpson. At Fort McLoughlin, Isabella created relationships with other HBC officials, including Governor Simpson. She is mentioned in his memoirs where he recounts his impression of her. He wrote,"'the wife of Mr. Ross [...] a Saulteau half-breed of Lac La Pluie [...] displayed great courage'" in her daily life. He recounts an instance when Isabella was trading in a shop in Charles's absence. Several women came in and drew knives on one of Isabella's sons. In response, Isabella chased the women from the shop and carried on with her business. It was not uncommon for Isabella to assume her husband's role as trader while he was traveling. In a letter to his sister Elizabeth, Charles revealed that she suited the sphere of work, and that she had no problems moving around the west. He wrote that Isabella was not "fitted to shine at the head of a nobleman's table, but she suits the sphere [in which] she has to move much better than any such toy."

In 1843, Isabella and Charles moved again, to Fort Victoria on Vancouver Island, as HBC shut down the post at Fort McLoughlin. This move effectively made Charles the Chief Trader in command of the fort. They became the first Métis family to reside there. The family established a close relationship with James Douglas, as they established Fort Victoria as an important post for the fur trade. Shortly after this move, Charles died, on June 27, 1844. After his death, Isabella and her family moved to Fort Nisqually and settled there for 8 years.

== Later life ==
Isabella returned to Fort Victoria in 1854. She bought 99 acres of land, which in turn established her as the first female registered land owner in British Columbia. She turned this land into a farm which she called Fowl Bay Farm. In 1863, Isabella again married, this time to Lucius Simon O'Brien. They divorced that same year. Isabella died on April 23, 1885, at 77 in Fort Victoria, and is buried in Ross Bay Cemetery, Victoria, British Columbia.

== Legacy ==
Ross is an important figure in the history of Victoria, Métis peoples and indigenous feminism. The Ross Bay Cemetery, where her body lies, is named after her. Her epitaph reads:

Here Lies Isabella Mainville Ross. Born January 10, 1808. Died in Victoria April 23, 1885. She came here in 1843 with her husband, Chief Trader Charles Ross, who was in charge of building Fort Victoria. After his death she bought the land upon which you are standing for a farm. By doing so she became the first woman to own land in what is now British Columbia.

In their book Finding a Way to the Heart: Feminist Writings on Aboriginal and Women’s History in Canada, Robin Brownlie and Valerie Korinek use her as a figure to illustrate the problems faced by Métis peoples, and reflect on the relationship between race and gender in the 19th century.
