= Oak Bay Marina =

Marina in Oak Bay, British Columbia, Canada

Coordinates: 48.4249°N 123.3018°W

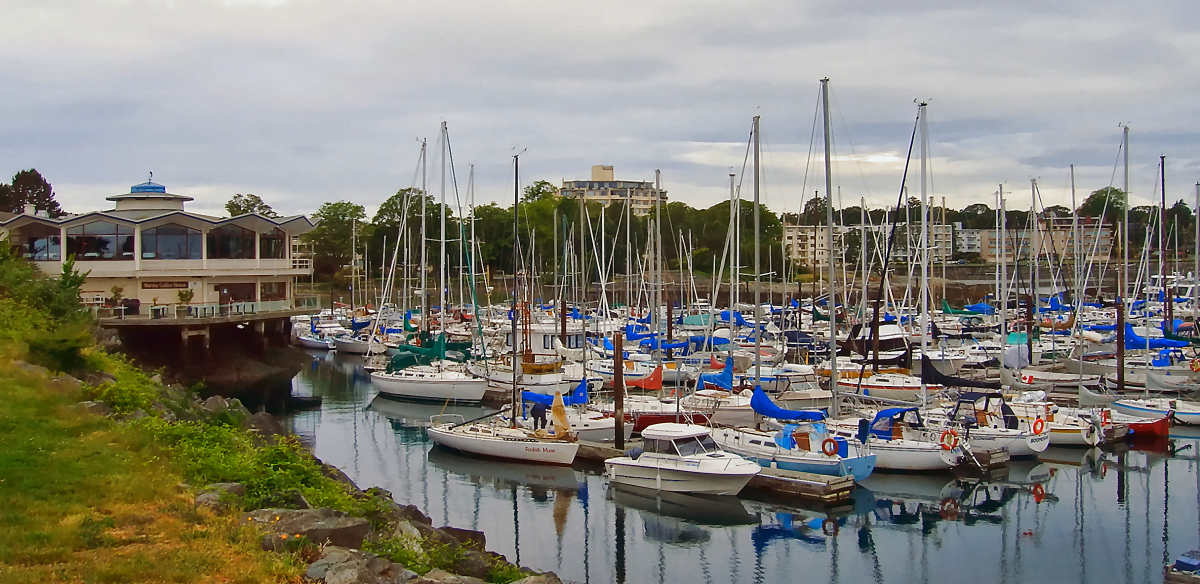
Oak Bay Marina

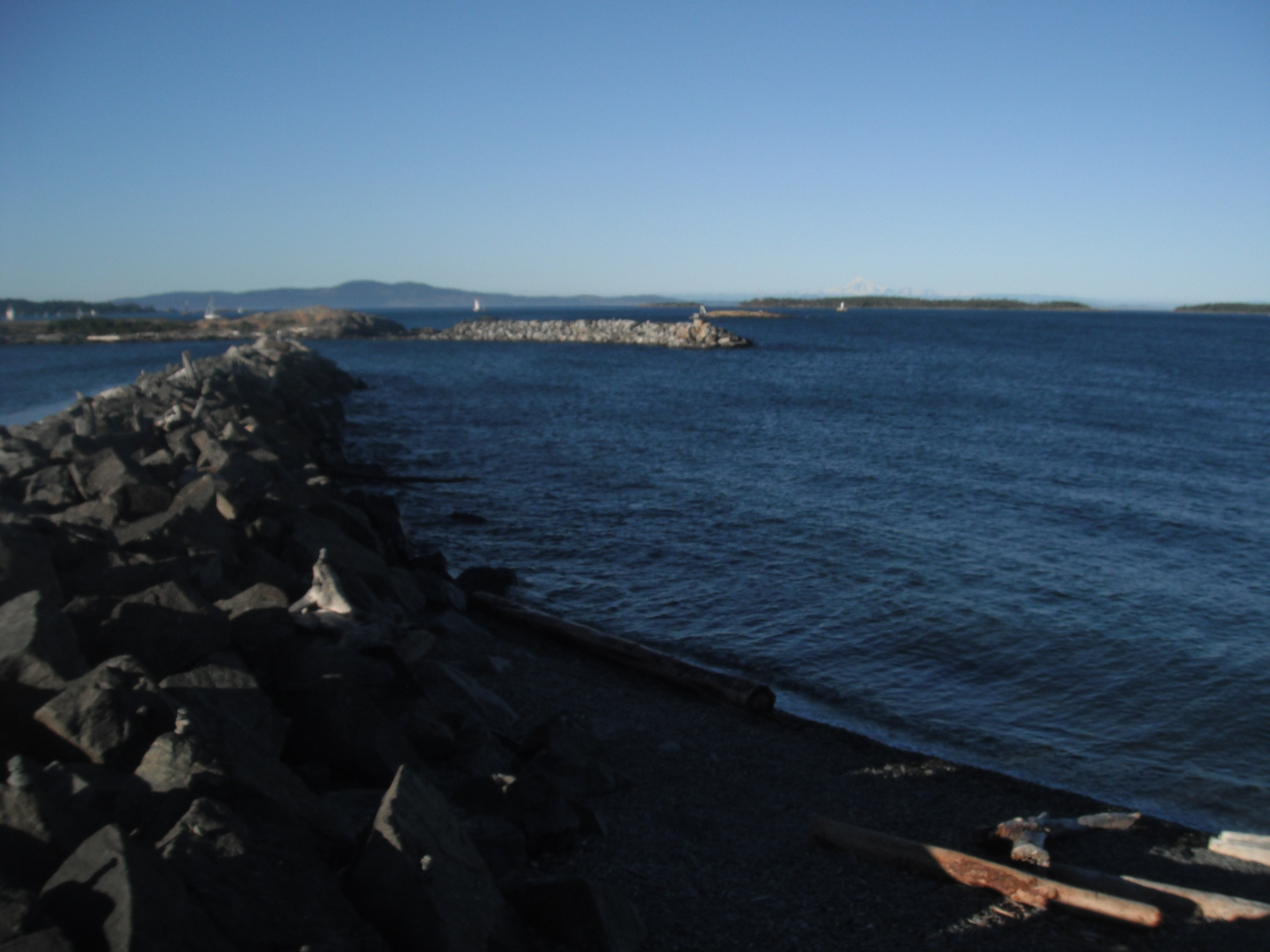
Oak Bay Breakwater

The Oak Bay Marina is located in South Oak Bay, adjacent to the city of Victoria, British Columbia, Canada. Built on Turkey Head Point, the Oak Bay Marina is operated by The Oak Bay Marine Group. It is home to a fuel dock, gift shop, coffee shop and restaurant as well as some private and community organisations: C-Tow Victoria (Greater Victoria Marine Assistance Ltd), Gartside Marine boat repairs (equipped with one railway boat lift located near the front Oak Bay Marina), Vela Yacht Sales, Oak Bay Sailing School, 12th Garry Oak Sea Scouts, Oak Bay Sea Rescue RCM-SAR Station #33, and the Oak Bay Recreation sailing program.

Oak Bay Marina is a border and Customs check in point (phone box only) located at the fuel dock.

== History ==
The Oak Bay breakwater was built in 1959 and funded by the Federal Government of Canada. One side is on Turkey Head Point and the other on Mary Tod Island.

The Oak Bay Marina was built by Bob Wright in 1962. It officially opened in April 1964. The new marina replaced the Oak Bay Boat House built in 1893.

The Oak Bay Marina was home to the Pacific Undersea Gardens opened in 1964 and later relocated to Victoria's inner harbour in 1969, where it operated until its closure on October 17, 2013.

The Oak Bay Marina was also home to Sealand of the Pacific which opened in 1969. The aquarium was populated by several Orcas that were hunted down and captured locally. Conditions for both whales and staff at the marina were widely criticized, and there were repeated calls to have the aquarium closed. The protests culminated in 1991, when one of the captured whales drowned a 20 year old trainer, Keltie Byrne, who had fallen into the pool. Renewed public pressure eventually forced the closure of Sealand of the Pacific in November 1992.

The large whale sculpture at the front of the Oak Bay Marina is dedicated to Dr. Clifford Carl, Director of the British Columbia Provincial Museum.

The Oak Bay Marina was visited in 1986 by then-US Vice President George H. W. Bush for a fishing trip off Oak Bay.

During October 1996, a large storm occurred. During this storm, a large portion of the Oak Bay Marina became detached, and blew through the bay towards Glenlyon - Norfolk School. A large number of boats were damaged, and there was still one man on the docks at the time. When quoted, he said "I looked around and people were waving at me from the docks, and they were getting farther and farther away". He was later rescued by the Coast Guard and brought ashore.
