= Frances Ramsay Simpson =

English diarist

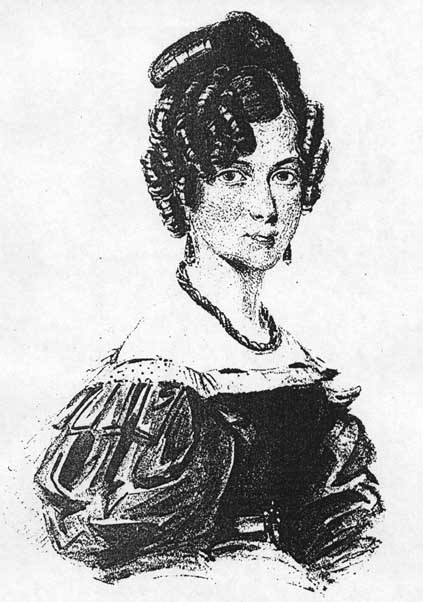
- Born: 28 March 1812 London, England
- Died: 21 March 1853 (aged 40) Lachine, Province of Canada
- Resting place: Mount Royal Cemetery
- Period: 1830–31
- Genre: Diary
- Spouse: Sir George Simpson (m. 1830)
- Children: 5

Frances Ramsay Simpson (28 March 1812 – 21 March 1853) was an English diarist and plant collector.

The daughter of Geddes Mackenzie Simpson, a London merchant, and Frances Hume Hawkins, she was born in London.

She married her cousin George Simpson of the Hudson's Bay Company in February 1830. In March of the same year, the couple set sail for North America, so he could resume his responsibilities in the administration of the North American fur trade. She travelled to York Factory and recorded the details of that voyage in her diary. The fur trading post on Rainy Lake was renamed Fort Frances in her honour. After her arrival in Rupert's Land, First Nations women married to Hudson's Bay Company officials were excluded from respectable society. During her stay in Rupert's Land, Simpson took an interest in local plants. She collected 52 specimens of individual plants, which she dried and pressed onto 14 sheets of paper, creating a small herbarium. She also sent seeds and roots back to her family in London. Her health deteriorated during her first pregnancy in 1831 and her son died the following year. She returned to London in 1833 to recover but her health continued to decline during three subsequent pregnancies.

She visited Lachine, just upstream of Montreal, with her husband in 1838 and, in 1845, moved there permanently. There she lived with her sister Isobel and Isobel's husband Duncan Finlayson, governor of Assiniboia. Simpson had another son in June 1850 and died in Lachine three years later.

Her account of her journey from Lachine to York Factory appeared in The Beaver in 1953 and 1954. The Simpson collection became part of the herbarium of naturalist and Hudson's Bay employee George Barnston, later integrated into the McGill University Herbarium. The Simpson collection, while small, contains many first recorded species for the province of Manitoba.
