= The Fur Trade at Lachine National Historic Site =

History museum in Quebec, Canada

Coordinates: 45.4314°N 73.6756°W

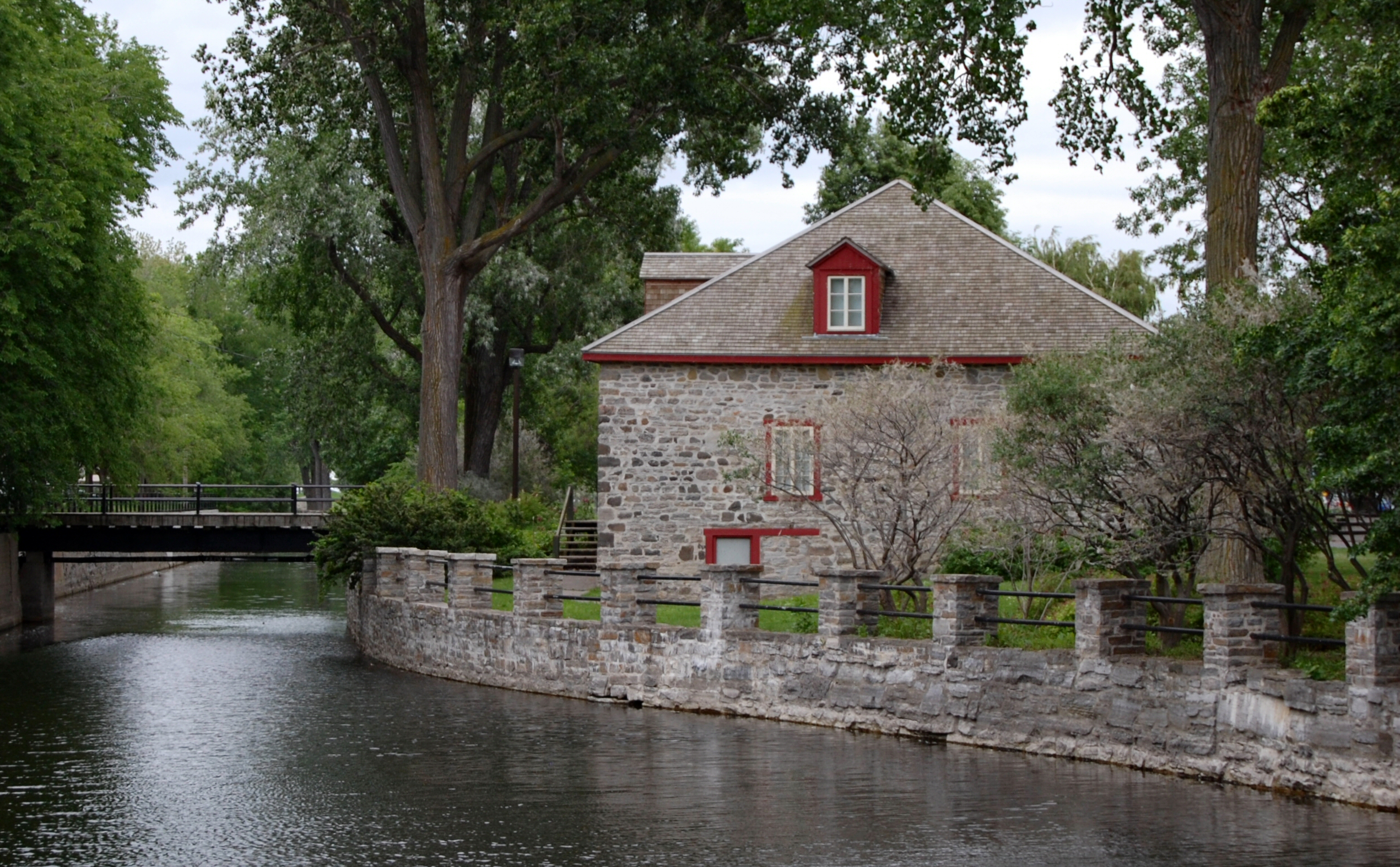
- The Fur Trade at Lachine and original Lachine Canal as in 1820s
- Location: Lachine in Montreal, Quebec, Canada.
- Type: history museum
- Website: Parks Canada

National Historic Site of Canada
- Official name: The Fur Trade at Lachine National Historic Site
- Designated: 1970

The Fur Trade at Lachine National Historic Site is a historic building located in the borough of Lachine in Montreal, Quebec, Canada, at the western end of the Lachine Canal. It is a National Historic Site of Canada.

Beginning in the 17th century, voyageurs would launch their canoes from this location to transport trade goods thousands of miles into the interior of North America lands. At that time the Lachine Rapids prevented large ships from going any further west along the Saint Lawrence River.

A stone warehouse was erected in 1803 to store the furs gathered as a result of fur trade. It is now a Parks Canada museum dedicated to the history of this strategic location as a departure and arrival point for fur trading expeditions. The site is separate from Lachine Canal National Historic Site, with which it is inextricably connected.

Montreal was the start of nearly all westward canoe routes. See Canadian canoe routes (early). Here furs were transferred from canoe to ship and trade goods from ship to canoe. A natural transfer point was the west end of Montreal Island since goods could be carted over a nine-mile road around the Lachine Rapids. Canoes usually left in May and returned in August. The Northwest Company built a stone warehouse here in 1803. It was used until 1859 when it was sold to the Sisters of Sainte Anne who used it as an employee residence. The Lachine Canal was built around the rapids in 1825. Sir George Simpson (administrator) had a mansion across the canal from the warehouse which was torn down in 1880. Parks Canada acquired the warehouse in 1977 and in 1985 opened a museum.

== Affiliations ==
The Museum is affiliated with: the Canadian Museums Association, Canadian Heritage Information Network, and Virtual Museum of Canada.
