= Rock Depot =

Rock Depot was a Hudson's Bay Company depot on the Hayes River about 120 miles upstream from Hudson Bay. It was established in 1794 by Joseph Colen, the chief factor at York Factory, who thought it inefficient to use canoes on the lower river. Here boats from York Factory were unloaded and goods placed in canoes for the more difficult journey upstream. By 1798 32 low-wage men were able to carry in 4 boats cargo that formerly required 72 highly paid voyageurs. Rock Depot was a transfer point and not intended as a trading post. In 1812 extra facilities were built for Lord Selkirk's Red River Colony. In 1820 George Simpson (administrator) met William Williams here. He proposed that record-keeping be moved back to York Factory because of the low quality of the up-country clerks. In 1821, when the HBC merged with the Northwest Company, many of the details were worked out at a meeting at Rock Depot. With the establishment of Norway House Rock Depot declined since it was too far from the Athabasca country and the sources of pemmican. It is said that the first Protestant marriage in western Canada was performed here in 1820 (Reverend John West married Thomas Bunn, in charge of Rock Depot, to Phoebe Sinclair.). The site was at the east side of the mouth of the north-flowing White Mud Creek across from a high bank on the west side of the creek (probably 55°40'02"N, 93°31'55"W). Downstream is Rock Portage, the last rapids on the river. The site is now overgrown with trees.
