= McNeill Bay (British Columbia) =

Bay in British Columbia, Canada

Coordinates: 48°24′43″N 123°18′48″W

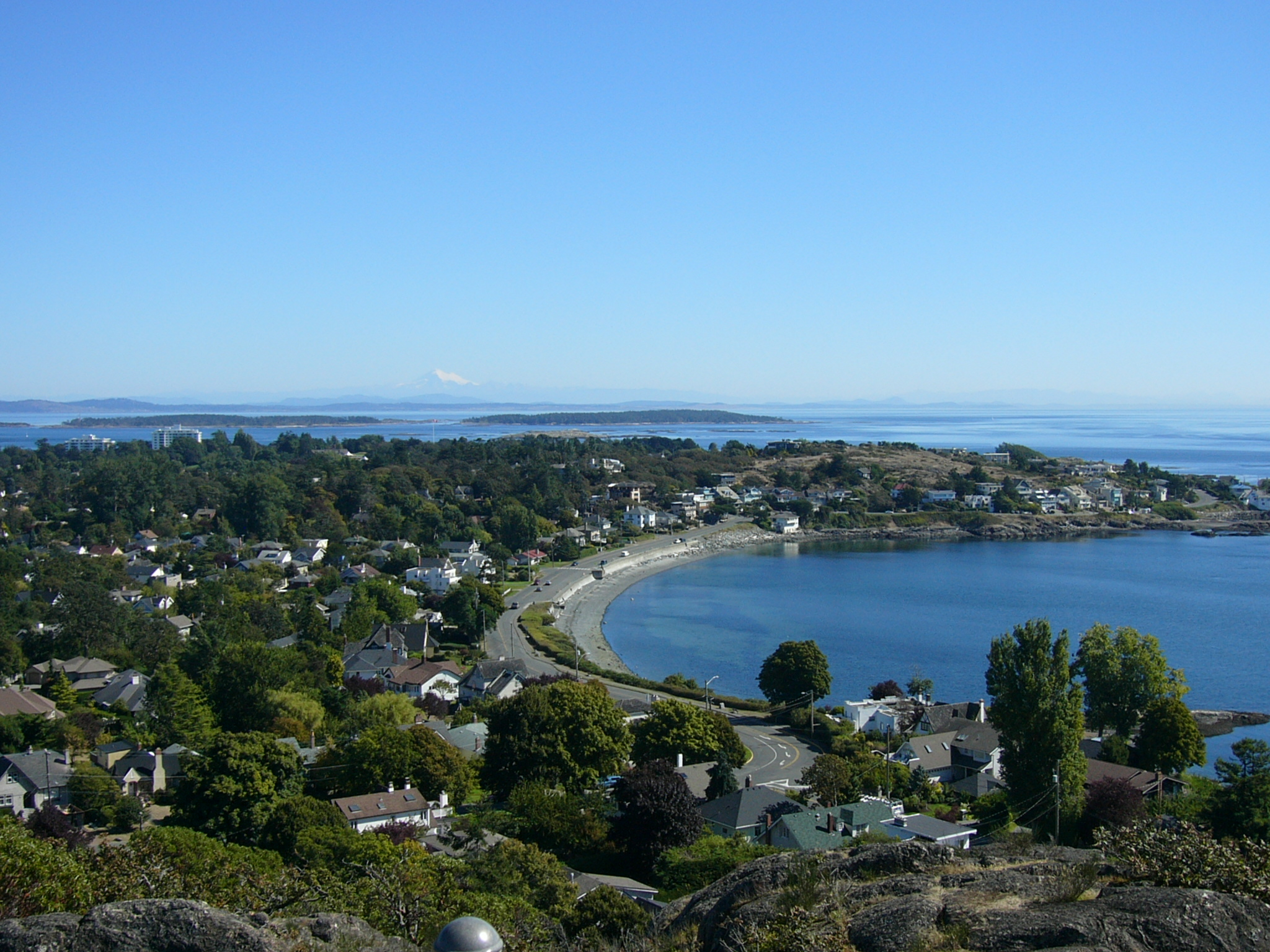
McNeill Bay seen from Walbran Park on Gonzales Hill with Mount Baker in the distance.

McNeill Bay (a.k.a. Shoal Bay) lies within the boundaries of Oak Bay, British Columbia along the coast of Vancouver Island. It was named after Captain William Henry McNeill, master of the Hudson's Bay Company steamer SS Beaver, and one of the five original landowners of Oak Bay.

On 14 March 1843 the SS Beaver anchored in this bay, with James Douglas (Chief Factor of the Hudson's Bay Company) as the site for Fort Victoria was being scouted.

The land where the esplanade currently runs along the shoreline was a gift from Rosina Irene Margaret Ross.

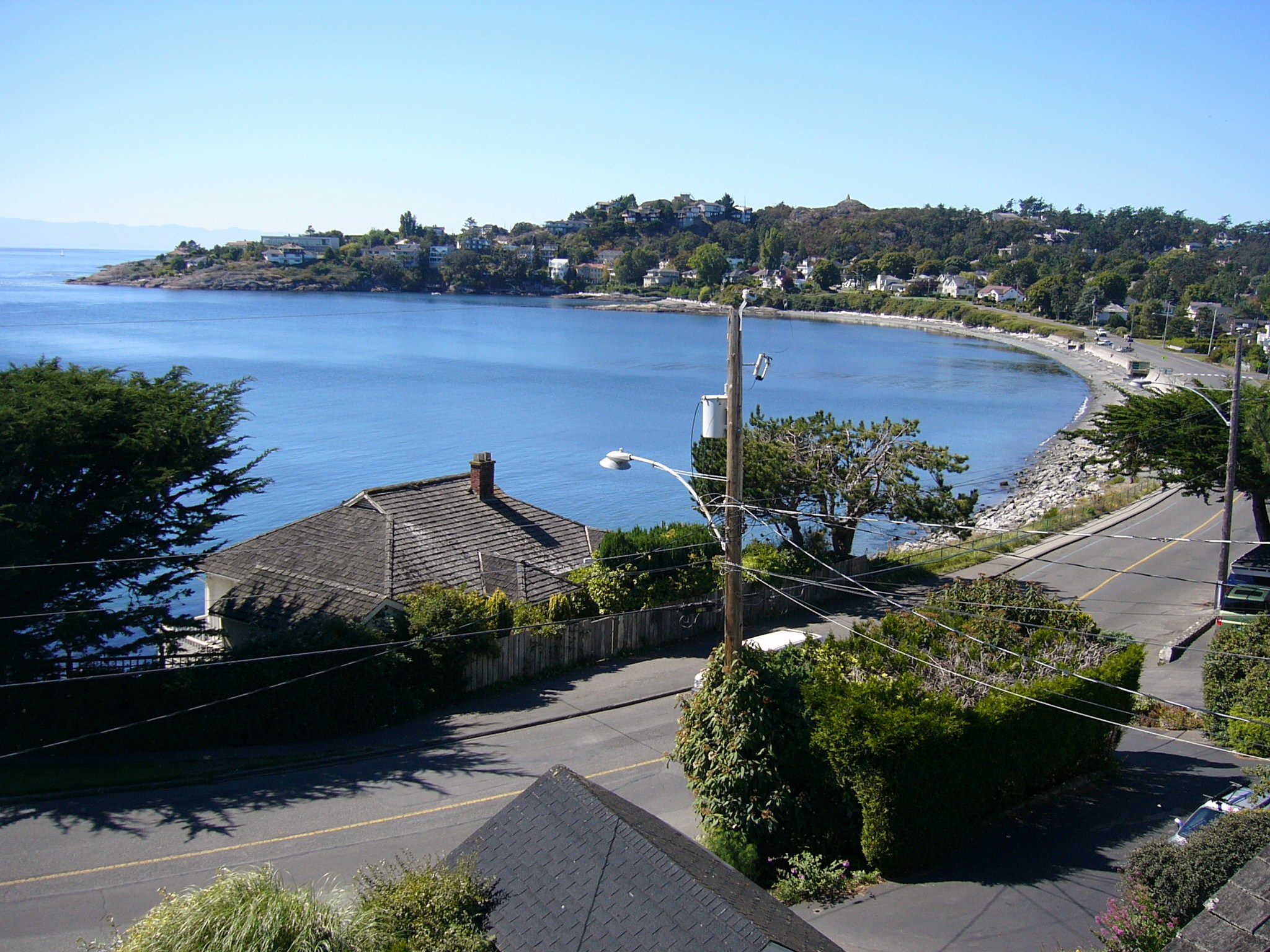
McNeill Bay as seen overlooking Beach Drive.

Plaque commemorating Victoria's settlement.

Plaque remembering McNeill homestead.

Plaque honoring McNeill memories.

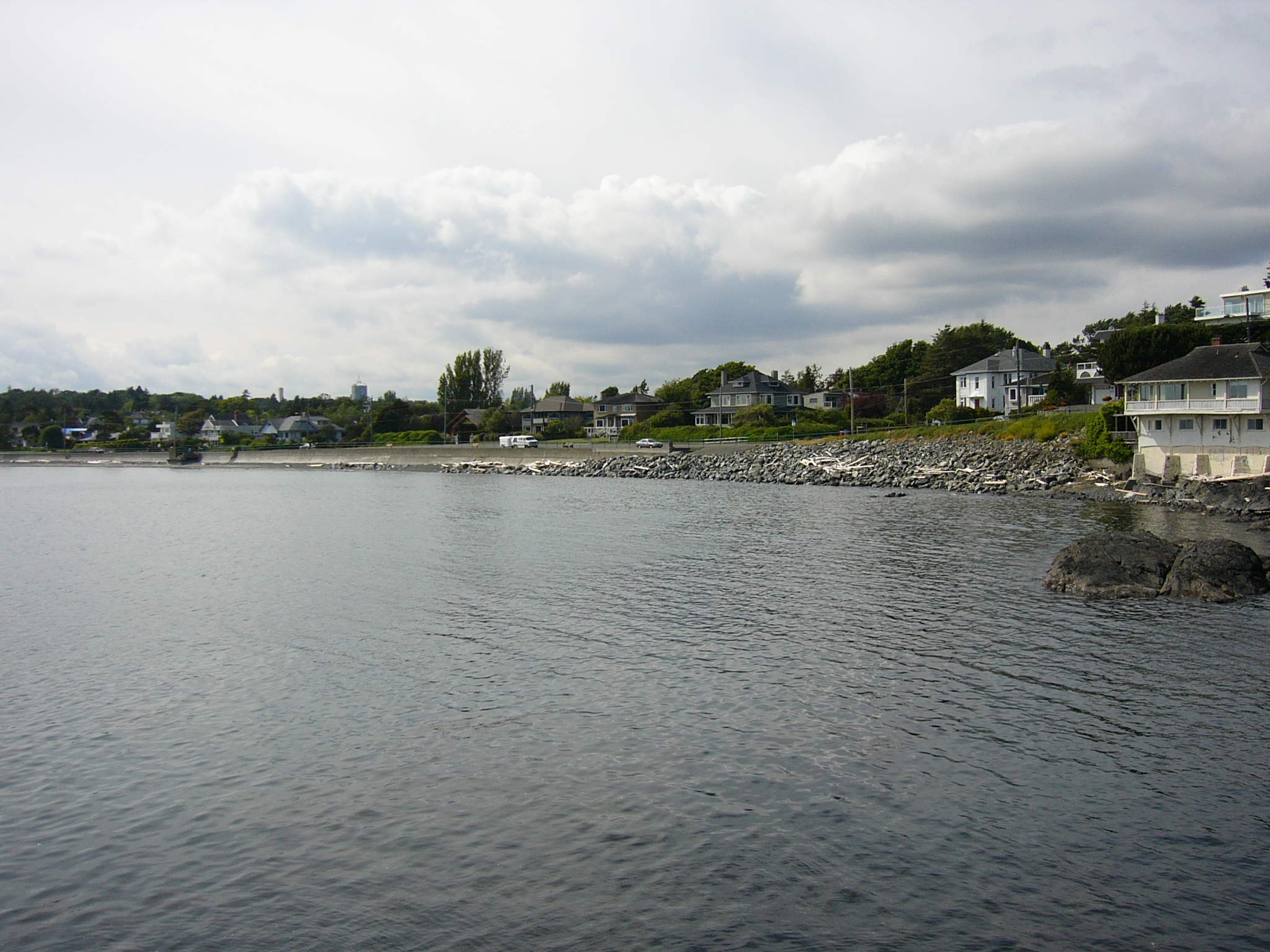
A view towards the esplanade.

Plaque thanking Ross donation.

Sign reminding dogs how to behave.
