= Duncan Finlayson (governor of Assiniboia) =

Canadian politician

Duncan Finlayson (ca 1796 – July 25, 1862) was a Scottish-born officer in the Hudson's Bay Company. He served as governor of Assiniboia, also known as the Red River Colony, from 1839 to 1844.

== Life ==
The son of John Finlayson, he was born in Dingwall, Scotland, and joined the Hudson's Bay Company (HBC) as a "writer" in 1815. He was supervisor for the Peace River District from 1820 to 1821. He returned to England in 1825 for medical treatment after being accidentally shot. He served as clerk at Red River from 1826 to 1831. In 1828, he became chief trader and, in 1831, chief factor. He travelled west to the Columbia River Department in 1831 expecting to succeed John McLoughlin as supervisor there; however, McLoughlin chose to continue as supervisor. Finlayson purchased the brig Lama in 1832. He founded Fort McLoughlin on Dowager Island in 1833, made three trips to the Sandwich Islands and negotiated with the Russians to supply goods at Sitka. He went on leave from 1834 to 1835 and left the region in 1937, returning to Scotland. In 1838, he married Isobel Graham Simpson, sister-in-law to George Simpson.

In the spring of 1839, Finlayson became governor of Assiniboia. He recruited settlers for a proposed HBC colony at Puget Sound and sent 23 families to that area in 1841 in an unsuccessful attempt to counter American expansion in that area. In 1844, he moved to Lachine to supervisor the Montreal Department. He travelled to Washington in 1848 with George Simpson and Henry Hulse Berens to negotiate land claims on behalf of the HBC. Finlayson retired from service in June 1855 but was reappointed to the post in Lachine six months later. He retired to London in 1859.

He died in London in 1862.

His brother Nicol was a chief factor with the HBC.
