= William Henry McNeill =

American captain and discoverer of Victoria Harbour

- Born: July 7, 1803; Boston, Massachusetts
- Died: September 4, 1875 (aged 72); Victoria, British Columbia, Canada
- Burial place: Ross Bay Cemetery
- Occupations: Master mariner, HBC chief factor, and pioneer
- Employer: Hudson's Bay Company
- Spouse: Mathilda (died 1850) Martha (after 1850)
- Children: 6

William Henry McNeill (7 July 1803 – 4 September 1875) was an American marine captain and explorer, best known for his 1830 expedition as the captain of the brig Llama (also spelled Lama), which sailed from Boston, Massachusetts, United States, 12,000 miles (19,000 km) around Cape Horn, to the Pacific Northwest on a maritime fur trade expedition.

== Biography ==
Boston merchants owned the brig whose cargo consisted of trading merchandise. The Chief Factor of the Hudson's Bay Company for the region, Roderick Finlayson, purchased the Llama and its cargo in Honolulu in 1832 and retained McNeill as captain. In order to work for the company, it made an exception to its policy of requiring that all of its employees be British subjects. McNeill was an American, born in Boston. He provided the company for the first time with a ship commanded by a man who knew the north west coast well.

In 1834 John McLoughlin had McNeill take Lama to Makah territory to rescue three Japanese sailors whose vessel, the Hojunmaru, had wrecked near Cape Flattery after being damaged in a storm near Japan and drifting across the ocean for over a year, with all but three of the crew dying of scurvy. The three survivors, Iwakichi, Kyukichi, and Otokichi, were ransomed by McNeill from the Makah who had enslaved them. After living at Fort Vancouver for several months, the three Japanese were taken to London in hopes they might help open trade between Britain and Japan. From London they were taken to Macau, but attempts to return them to their homeland were rejected by Japan, and they lived their lives in Macau and elsewhere in the Far East. They were the first Japanese to visit what is now Washington and London.

In 1836, the Hudson's Bay Company vessel, S.S. Beaver, the first steamship on the Pacific Northwest Coast, arrived at Fort Vancouver. McNeill took over as the second captain of the Beaver in 1837 and remained so until 1851.

In 1837, the company was concerned that a site be found to replace Fort Vancouver in case they were ever driven out of that area, and directed McNeill aboard the Beaver to explore for a suitable location for the operations of the company with a safe harbour and land suitable for cultivation. On 10 August that year, he located, according to his log, " . . an excellent harbour and a fine open country along the sea shore, apparently well adapted for both tillage and pasturage . . ." The location he found became Fort Victoria.

On 11 May 1841, along with Alexander Caulfield Anderson, McNeill greeted United States Navy Lt. Charles Wilkes of the United States Exploring Expedition when Wilkes anchored his sailing ship, USS Porpoise in southern Puget Sound near Fort Nisqually, a Hudson's Bay Company trading post near the present town of Dupont, Washington.

On 14 March 1843 Captain McNeill anchored off Vancouver Island in McNeill Bay to scout the location for Fort Victoria.

He resigned command of the Beaver in 1843 following which, in 1849, he established Fort Rupert, near modern-day Port Hardy. McNeill was promoted to Chief Factor at Fort Simpson in 1856 and retired from the Hudson's Bay Company from that post in 1863. He retired to his farm on Vancouver Island near Victoria, British Columbia. He died there of pneumonia in 1875.

Port McNeill, British Columbia is named for Captain McNeill.

== See also ==
- McNeil Island
- Port McNeill, British Columbia
