= George Simpson (businessman) =

Scottish colonial administrator and explorer

Sir George Simpson
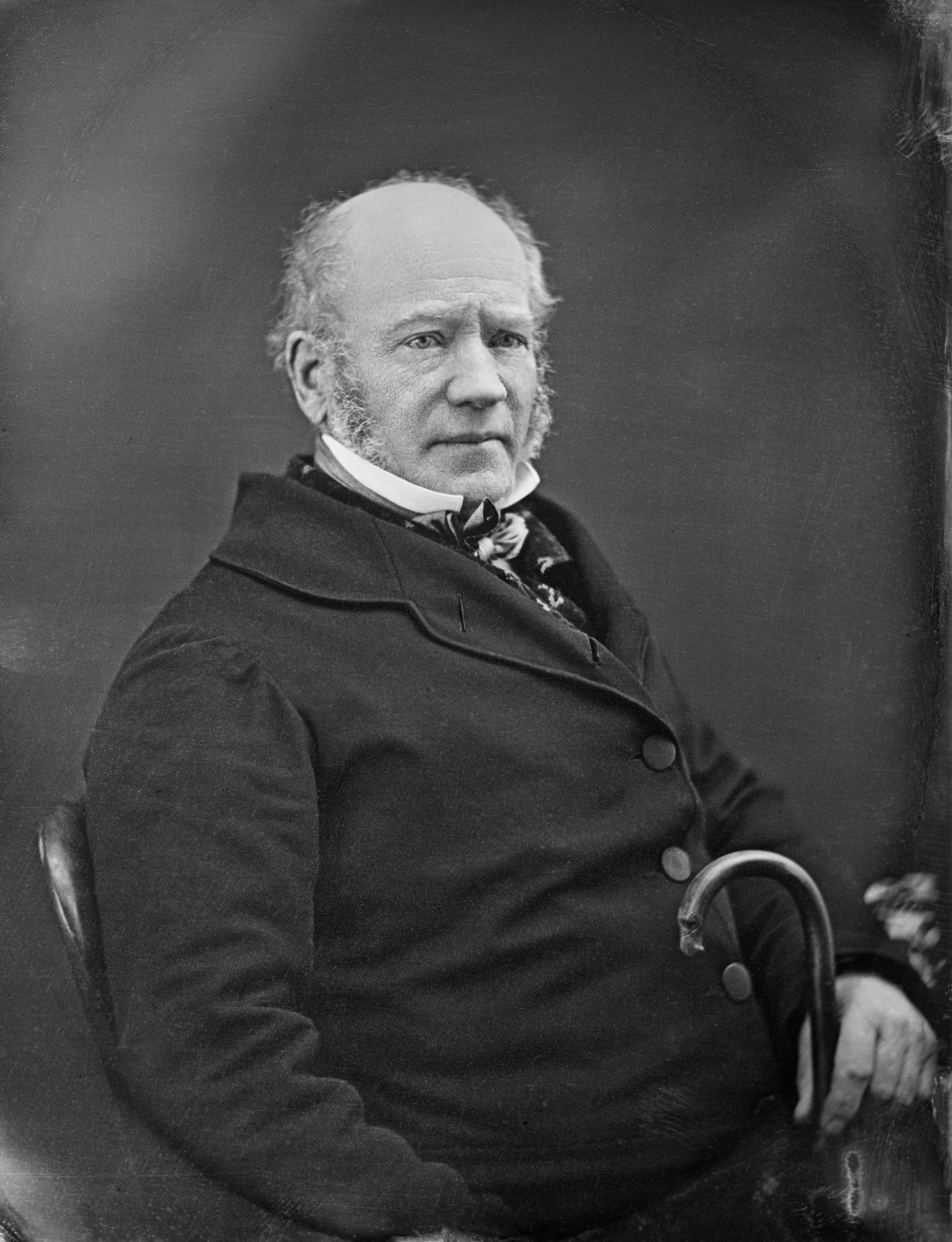
- Picture taken by William Notman in 1850.

Governor-in-Chief of Rupert's Land
- In office 29 March 1821 – 7 September 1860 (Note: Simpson was appointed Governor of the Southern Department of Rupert's Land on 29 March 1821 but swapped offices with Governor William Williams of the Northern Department in October 1821. Williams was recalled on 26 February 1826, and Simpson was given authority over both departments. Theoretically, both departments remained separate until Simpson was appointed Governor-in-Chief on 13 June 1839.)
- Preceded by: William Williams
- Succeeded by: William MacTavish
- Charter: Hudson's Bay Company

Personal details
- Born: c. 1792 Dingwall, Ross-shire, Scotland
- Died: 7 September 1860 (aged 68) Lachine, Province of Canada
- Resting place: Mount Royal Cemetery
- Spouse: Frances Ramsay Simpson (m. 1830; died 1853)
- Domestic partners: Elizabeth Sinclair (1821–1822); Margaret Taylor (1825–1830)
- Children: 11
- Relatives: Thomas Simpson (nephew)
- Awards: Knight Bachelor (1841)

Sir George Simpson (c. 1792 – 7 September 1860) was a Scottish explorer businessman. He was the colonial governor of the Hudson's Bay Company (HBC) during the period of its greatest power. From 1820 to 1860, he was in practice, if not in law, the British viceroy for the whole of Rupert's Land, an enormous territory of 3.9 million square kilometres (1.5 million square miles) corresponding to nearly forty per cent of modern-day Canada.

His efficient administration of the west was a precondition for the confederation of western and eastern Canada, which later created the Dominion of Canada. He was noted for his grasp of administrative detail and his physical stamina in traveling through the wilderness. Excepting voyageurs and their Siberian equivalents, few men have spent as much time travelling in the wilderness.

Simpson was also the first person known to have "circumnavigated" the world by land, and became the most powerful man of the North American fur trade during his lifetime.

Born out of wedlock to a solicitor in Dingwall, Scotland, Simpson was raised primarily by an aunt, and received a basic education at the local parish school. As a teenager, he was sent to apprentice as a clerk at an uncle's sugar brokerage in London, where he learned the intricacies of international trade, and demonstrated his clerical and managerial proficiency. He first came to the attention of the Hudson's Bay Company's management when his uncle's firm merged with that of Andrew Colvile-Wedderburn, a member of the Hudson Bay Company's board of directors.

In 1820, despite his lack of experience in the North American fur trade, Simpson was appointed as the company's North American governor-in-chief locum tenens. He was chosen as an outsider to replace the existing North American governor, William Williams, should he be arrested by the North West Company (NWC), with whom the HBC was in conflict. Simpson emigrated to North America that year, where he was placed in charge of the Athabasca Department. In 1821, upon the amalgamation of the HBC and NWC, he was appointed as the governor of the newly established Northern Department of the HBC, whose territory extended from Fort Albany to the Pacific coast. In 1826 he assumed authority over the Southern Department, making him the sole governor of the entirety of the Hudson's Bay Company's territory in North America.

His governorship was defined by the reorganization of the fur trade, a new focus on the Pacific coast, and his frequent cross-continental trips during which he would visit the forts within his domain. He made two trips to the Columbia River, in 1824 and 1827, and in 1841 made an overland journey around the world. He held the role of governor until his death in 1860.

== Early life ==
George Simpson was born c. 1792 in Dingwall, Ross-Shire, Scotland. (Note: There are no extant records of Simpson's birth, and the year of 1792 is an estimate.) He was the illegitimate son of George Simpson Sr., a solicitor from the nearby village of Avoch, and was related by marriage to Sir Alexander Mackenzie. Simpson Jr.'s great-grandfather was the 2nd Scottish Lord of Gruinard, George Mackenzie, grandson of George Mackenzie, 2nd Earl of Seaforth of Clan Mackenzie, and descendant of Lord Duncan Forbes of Culloden. Having originally been sent to Dingwall for his legal apprenticeship, Simpson Sr. eventually served as a solicitor for the Sheriff's Court. In 1786, when his father Thomas Simpson died, Simpson Sr. was joined in Dingwall by his mother Isobel, and his younger siblings Jean, Mary, Geddes and Duncan.

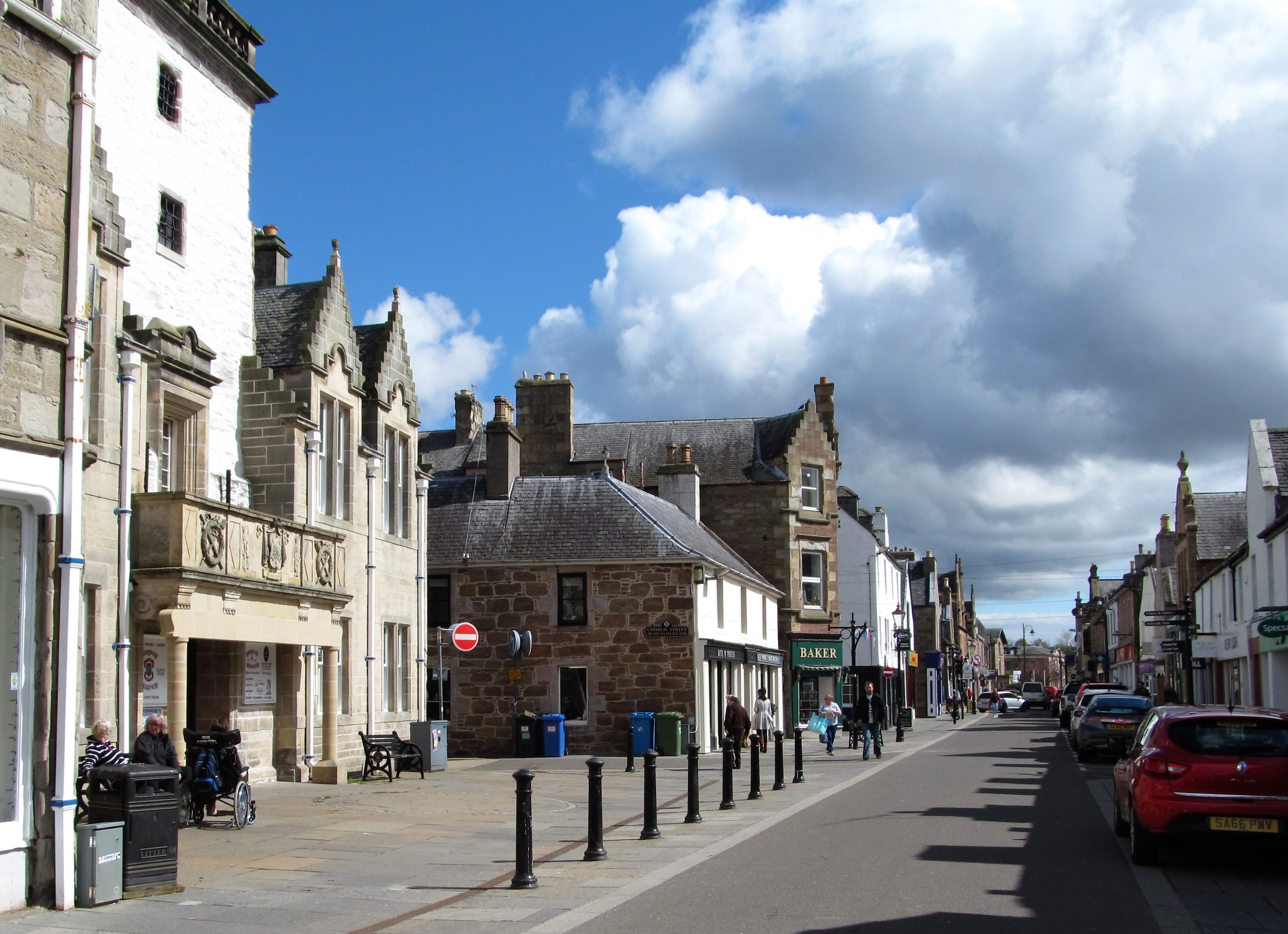
Intersection of High Street and Church Street in Dingwall, the location of the schoolhouse where Simpson was educated.

Simpson was primarily raised by his aunt Mary, who served as his foster mother particularly after his father left to work in the nearby town of Ullapool. He received about eight or nine years of education at the parish school, where he was taught reading, writing, arithmetic and geography. He studied alongside Æmelius Simpson, the illegitimate son of the schoolmaster Alexander Simpson, who would later also work for the Hudson's Bay Company. Towards the end of his education, he tutored Duncan Finlayson, who would remain a close friend. In 1807, the schoolmaster Alexander Simpson married George's aunt Mary, and a year later she gave birth to Thomas Simpson, George's first cousin, who he would later employ for the HBC.

=== London years (1808–1820) ===
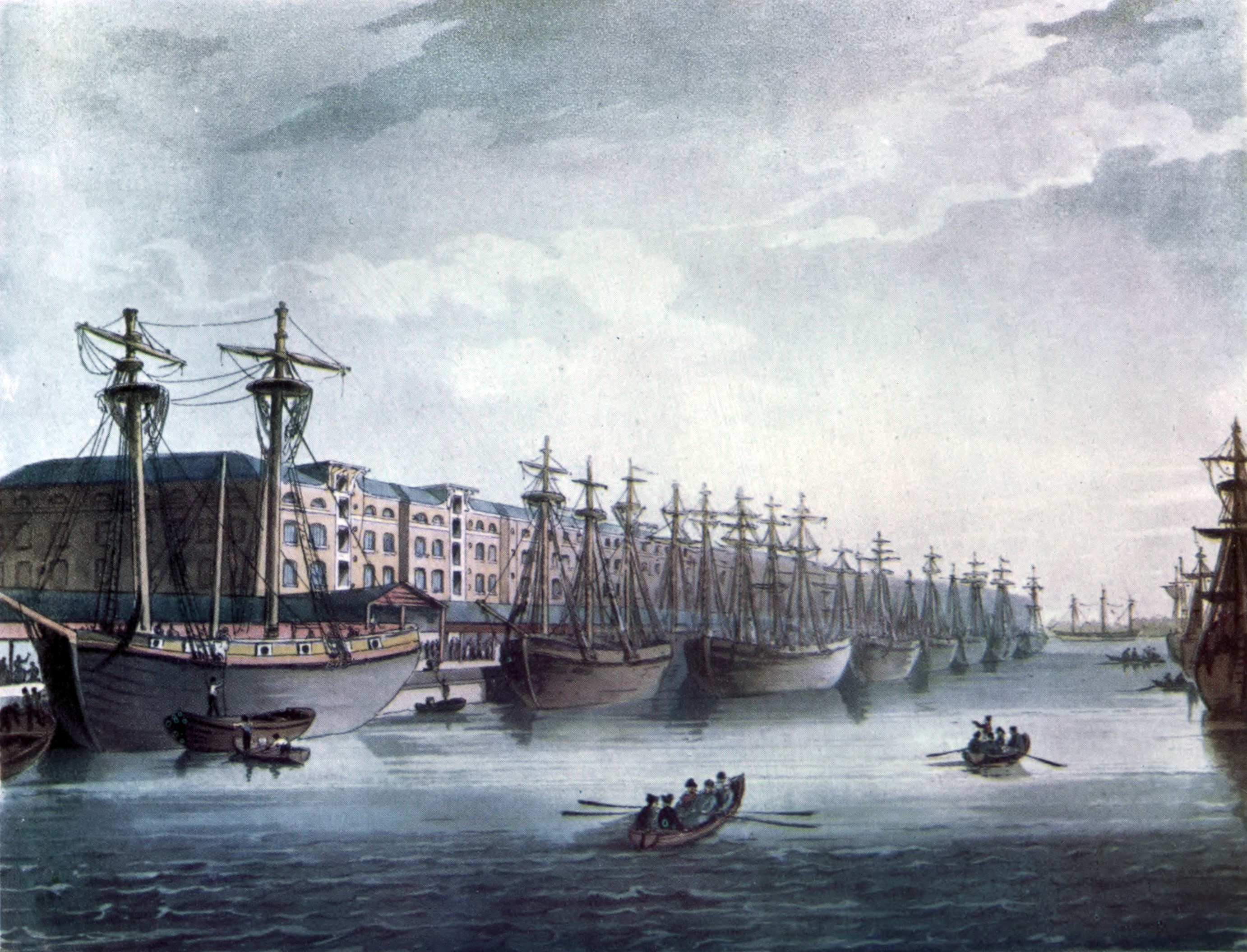
The West India Docks in London, in 1810, where Simpson would have checked the incoming inventory for his uncle Geddes' sugar brokerage

Unlike much of his family, George did not continue his education beyond the parochial level. Rather than proceeding to a university education, he instead entered into the workforce. In about 1808, with the help of "assiduous entreaty" on behalf of his aunt Mary, George was given an apprenticeship in his uncle Geddes Mackenzie Simpson's sugar brokerage in London, which imported sugar from the West Indies. He spent a dozen years at his uncle's brokerage, during which time gained experience with business administration and the intricacies of international trade. During his time as a clerk, his work ethic and aptitude for the sugar trade won him the "favourable attention of the partners in his firm." The exact nature of his work as a clerk is unknown, though as his biographer John S. Galbraith argued, he had clearly "risen to a position in the firm much more responsible than that of a mere book keeper" based on the attention he received by the partners.

In 1812, his uncle's firm merged with that of Andrew Colvile-Wedderburn, a fellow Scottish businessman who had inherited a sugar plantation in Jamaica. This partnership connected Simpson to the Hudson's Bay Company, as Wedderburn was on the company's Board of Governors alongside his brother-in-law, Thomas Douglas, 5th Earl of Selkirk.

== Career ==
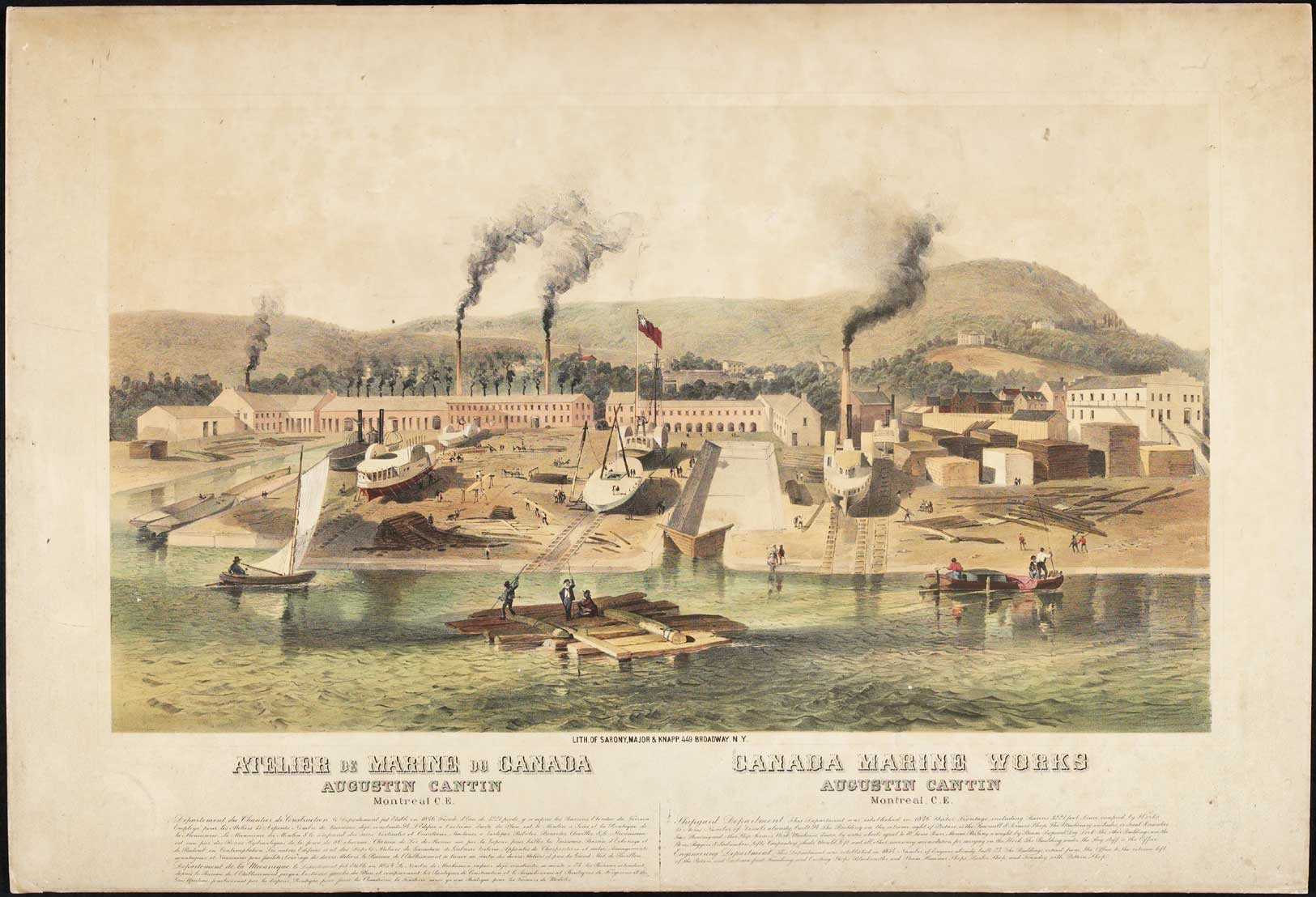
Lachine Canal, Montreal, mid 19th century

This was at the time of conflict between the HBC and the North West Company. Governor William Williams, who had been sent out in 1818, had arrested or captured several North West Company men. The Nor'Westers replied with a Quebec warrant for Williams' arrest. The London governors were unhappy with Williams' clumsy management and both companies were under British pressure to settle their differences. The locum tenens in Simpson's title meant that if Williams had been arrested, Simpson would take his place. In 1820, he joined the prominent Beaver Club.

He went by ship to New York, by boat and cart to Montreal and left by the usual route for York Factory on Hudson Bay. He met Williams at Rock Depot on the Hayes River. Since Williams had not been arrested he was William's subordinate and was sent west to Fort Wedderburn on Lake Athabaska. There he spent the winter learning about, and reorganizing, the fur trade. On his return journey in 1821, he learned that the two companies had merged. This put an end to a ruinous and sometimes violent competition and converted the HBC monopoly into an informal government for western Canada. He escorted that year's furs to Rock Depot and returned upriver to Norway House for the first meeting of the merged companies. There he learned that he had been made governor of the Northern—that is, western—Department and Williams had been made his equal in the Southern Department south of Hudson Bay. In December 1821, the HBC monopoly was extended to the Pacific coast.

After the meeting he returned downstream to take up his duties at York Factory. In December 1821, he set out on snowshoes for Cumberland House and then the Red River Colony. By July 1822, he was back at York Factory for the second meeting of the Northern Council, the first that he chaired. After the meeting he went by water to Lac Île-à-la-Crosse and then by dog sled to Fort Chipewyan and Fort Resolution on the Tıdeè Lake. He then went south to Fort Dunvegan on the Peace River and then Fort Edmonton and after the thaw, back to York Factory.

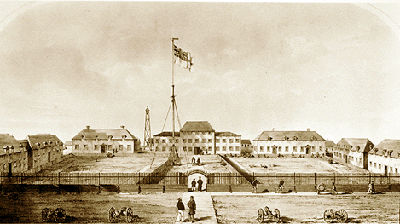
York Factory, Hudson's Bay Company trading post

=== Second trip to the Columbia (1824–25) ===
In August 1824, he left York Factory for the Pacific, taking the unorthodox Nelson–Burntwood River route, and ascended the Churchill River and Athabasca Rivers to Jasper House at the east side of Athabasca Pass. He crossed the pass on horseback to Boat Encampment and then down the Columbia River, reaching its mouth on November 8 at Fort George, previously named Fort Astoria. This 80-day journey was 20 days faster than the previous record. He moved the headquarters of the Columbia District to Fort Vancouver, guessing that the south side of the river might fall to the Americans.

He left in March 1825, and crossed the snow-covered Athabasca Pass. From Fort Assiniboine he went on horseback 80 miles (130 km) south to Fort Edmonton on the North Saskatchewan River. He had ordered this new road laid out on his outward voyage. It was a major saving over the old Methye Portage route. He went 500 miles (800 km) on horseback from Fort Carlton to the Red River settlements, and then by boat to York Factory. During this trip his servant, Tom Taylor, became separated on a hunting trip. After searching for half a day, Simpson left Taylor to his fate. Taylor reached the Swan River post after 14 days in the wilderness with no proper equipment.

=== Third trip to the Columbia (1828–29) ===
In 1825, he returned to Britain and learned that William Williams had retired, thereby adding the eastern area to his domain. Returning to Montreal, he went to the Red River settlements, Rock Depot for the annual meeting, the posts on James Bay to inspect his new domain, and back to Montreal. In May 1828, he started his second trip to the Pacific along with his dog, mistress and personal piper, going first to York Factory and then using the Peace River route. This 5,000-mile (8,000 km) trip remains the longest North American canoe journey ever made in one season.

=== Marriage and knighthood (1830–41) ===
He returned via Athabasca Pass to Moose Factory and Montreal and immediately went south to New York and took ship to Liverpool. After a brief courtship he married his first cousin, Frances Ramsay Simpson, in February 1830, and returned with his new wife to New York, Montreal, Michipicoten, Ontario, for the annual meeting, York Factory, and Red River. Here his wife gave birth to his first legitimate child, who soon died. In 1832, John Jacob Astor approached Gov. Simpson for talks to restrain liquor from the fur trade, and the two met in New York, but a binding agreement never ensued.

In May 1833, he suffered a mild stroke. He and his wife returned to Scotland, where she remained for the next five years and gave birth to a baby girl. In the spring of 1834, he returned to Canada and attended the Southern Council at Moose Factory in May and the Northern Council at York Factory in June, inspected posts on the Saint Lawrence, and arrived back in England in October 1835.

In the summer of 1838, he went to Saint Petersburg to negotiate with Baron Ferdinand von Wrangel of the Russian-American Company. The Russians recognized the HBC posts and the HBC agreed to supply the Russian posts. He then went to Montreal, Red River, Moose Factory, the Saint Lawrence posts, and down the Hudson to New York, where he took ship to England. Simpson received the title of Knight Bachelor from Queen Victoria, giving him the non-hereditary title of Sir on 25 January 1841.

=== Circumnavigation (1841–42) ===
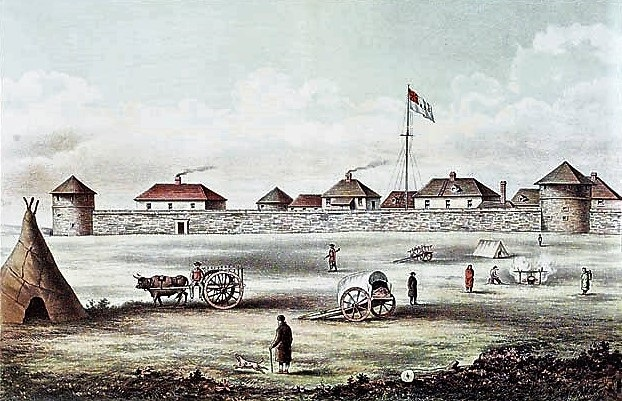
Old Fort Garry - Winnipeg, Manitoba

He left London in March 1841, and went by canoe to Fort Garry (now the site of Winnipeg). On this part of the trip he was accompanied by James Alexander, 3rd Earl of Caledon, who left to hunt on the prairie and later published a journal. Travelling on horseback to Fort Edmonton, Simpson caught up with James Sinclair's wagon train of over 100 settlers heading for the Oregon Country, a sign of what would soon destroy his fur trade empire. Instead of taking the usual route, he went to what is now Banff, Alberta, made the first recorded passage of the pass named after him in August, and went down the Kootenay River to Fort Vancouver.

Guessing that the 49th parallel border would be extended to the Pacific and considering the difficulties of the Columbia Bar, he proposed to move the HBC headquarters to what is now Victoria, British Columbia, a suggestion that earned him the enmity of John McLoughlin, who had done much to develop the Columbia district. Simpson took the Beaver north along the Pacific coast to the Russian post at Sitka, and then another boat as far south as Santa Barbara, stopping at the HBC post of Yerba Buena.

At some point he met Mariano Vallejo, a Californio statesman and general. He sailed to the HBC post in Hawaii (then known as the Sandwich Islands) in February 1842, and back to Sitka, where he took a Russian ship to Okhotsk in June. He went on horseback to Yakutsk, up the Lena River by horse-drawn boat, visited Lake Baikal, went by horse and later carriage to Saint Petersburg and reached London by ship at the end of October. This trip was documented in his book, An overland journey round the world.

==== Hawaii ====
During his visit to Hawaii, he met with King Kamehameha III and his advisers. Simpson, along with Timoteo Haʻalilio and William Richards were commissioned as joint Ministers Plenipotentiary on 8 April 1842. Simpson, shortly thereafter, left for England, via Alaska and Siberia, while Haʻalilio and Richards departed for the United States, via Mexico, on 8 July. The Hawaiian delegation, while in the United States, secured the assurance of President John Tyler of its recognition of Hawaiian independence on 19 December, and then proceeded to meet Simpson in Europe and secure formal recognition by Great Britain and France. He was instrumental in arranging conferences between Hawaiian representatives and the British Foreign Office which resulted in a British commitment to recognize the independence of the islands. On 17 March 1843, King Louis Philippe I of France recognized Hawaiian independence at the urging of King Leopold I of Belgium, and on 1 April, Lord Aberdeen on behalf of Queen Victoria, assured the Hawaiian delegation that: "Her Majesty's Government was willing and had determined to recognize the independence of the Sandwich Islands under their present sovereign."

== Later life ==
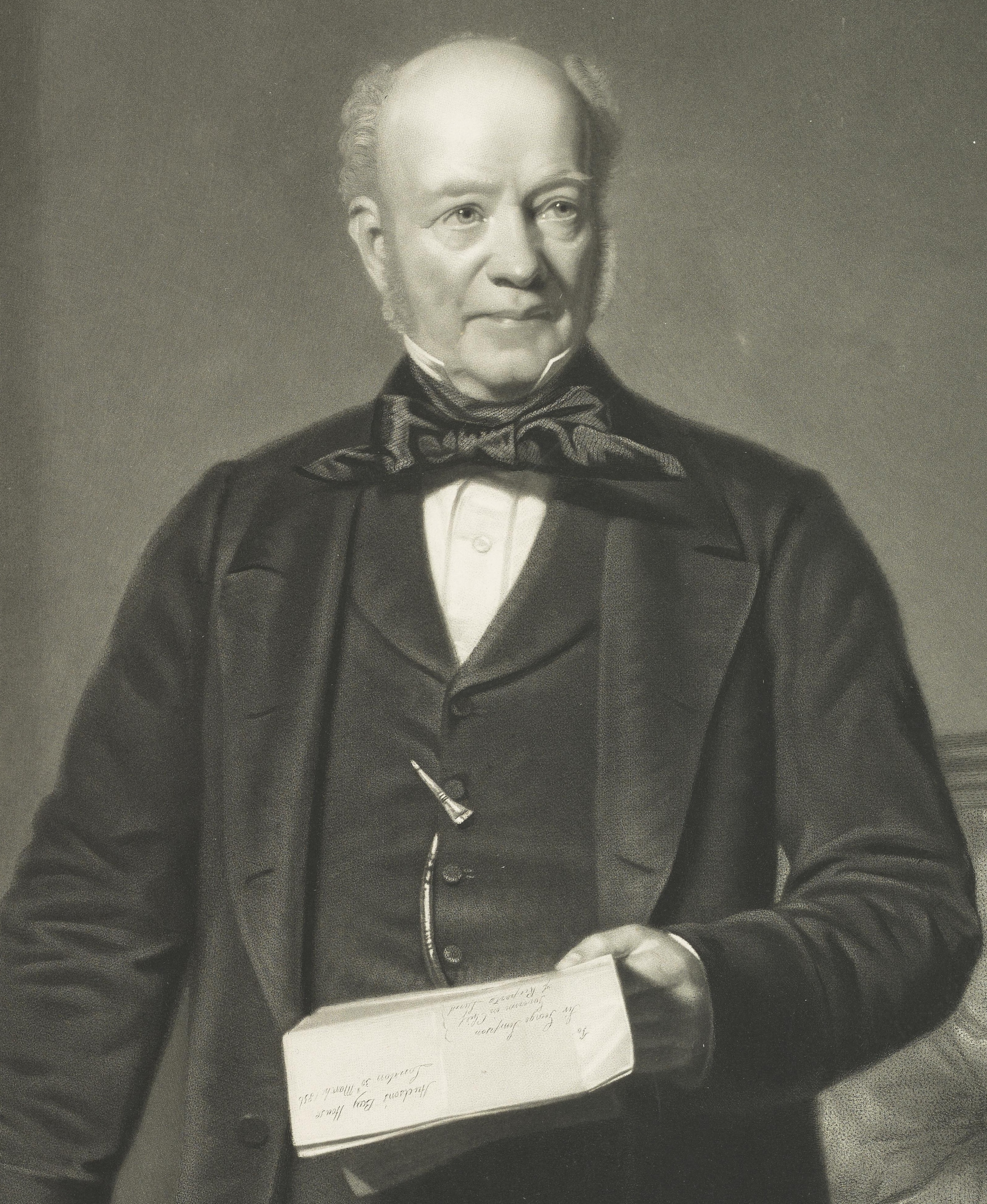
Simpson portrait by Stephen Pearce

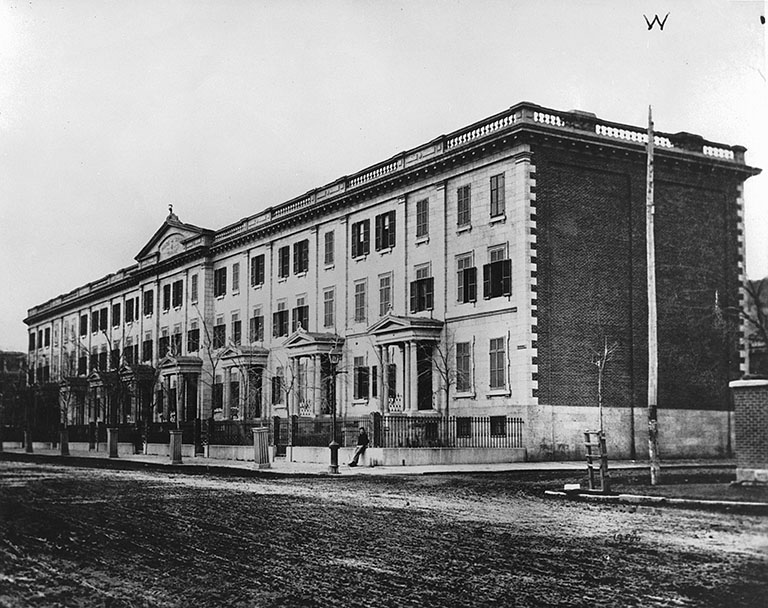
Prince of Wales Terrace, built by Simpson in the Golden Square Mile

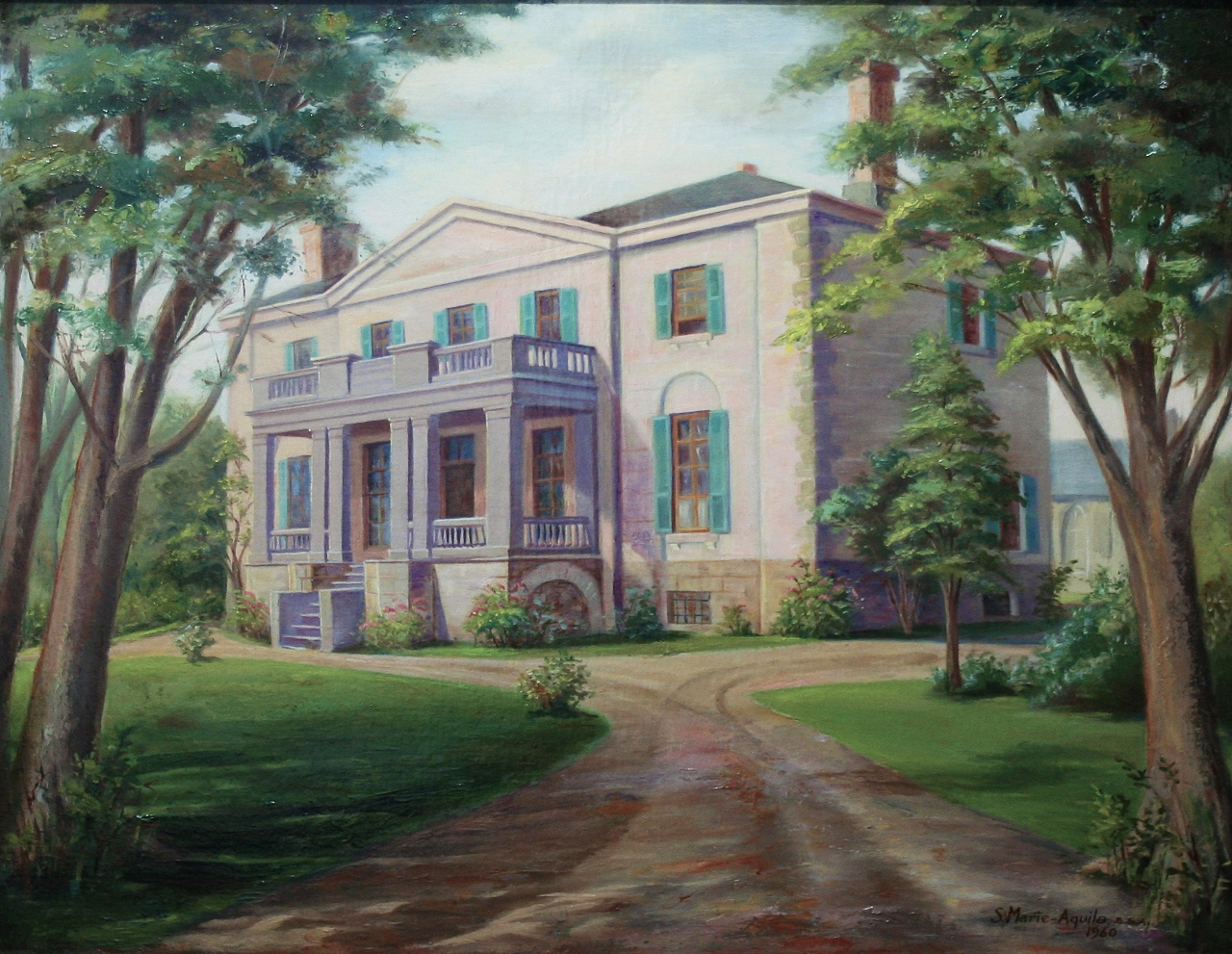
Manoir Simpson, built in 1834 in Lachine, Montreal, next to the Fur Trade Depot, later became part of Collège Sainte-Anne

Simpson and his wife had a large house on the Lachine Canal across from the depot from which the fur brigades started west. He also owned other estates such as a Manor in Coteau-du-Lac that he sold to the Comte de Beaujeu and Adélaïde de Gaspé, and another estate in Dorval where he received and entertained Prince Edward VII, of the House of Saxe-Coburg and Gotha. The Manor's estate included the Fur Trade Depot, and was later sold to Senator Lawrence Alexander Wilson and Lt. Col. W. A. Grant of the Royal Regiment of Canadian Artillery. Lord Donald Smith of Knebworth House, Co-Premier of Canada Sir Francis Hincks, and other leading members of Montreal's society would attend Simpson's banquets.

He began investing in banks, railroads, ships, mines and canals. He became a board director and shareholder of Canada’s first bank, the Bank of Montreal, as well as of the Bank of British North America, the Montreal and Lachine Railroad, the Champlain and St. Lawrence Railroad, the St. Lawrence and Atlantic Railroad, the Grand Trunk Railway, and the Montreal Ocean Steamship Company.

His business partners included Canada's richest man Sir Hugh Allan, Sir John Rose, Sir Alexander Mackenzie, President David Torrance, minister Luther H. Holton, Senator George Crawford, Senator Thomas Ryan, banker John Redpath, and bankers John Molson and William Molson.

With Governor Drummond, Sir Antoine-Aimé Dorion, and John Young, they founded the Transmundane Telegraph Company, but the venture later failed. In the spring of 1845, he went to Washington, D.C., to discuss the Oregon boundary with the Americans, which he had already done with Sir Robert Peel. In 1846, the Oregon Treaty established the current border. His wife contracted tuberculosis in 1846 and died in 1853.

In 1854, he was able to travel by rail to Chicago before he boarded his voyageur canoe at Sault Ste. Marie. In 1855, he was in Washington, D.C., and discussed Oregon affairs, and in 1857, defended the HBC monopoly in London. In May 1860, he went by rail to Saint Paul, Minnesota; decided that his health would not bear the trip to Red River; and returned to Lachine.

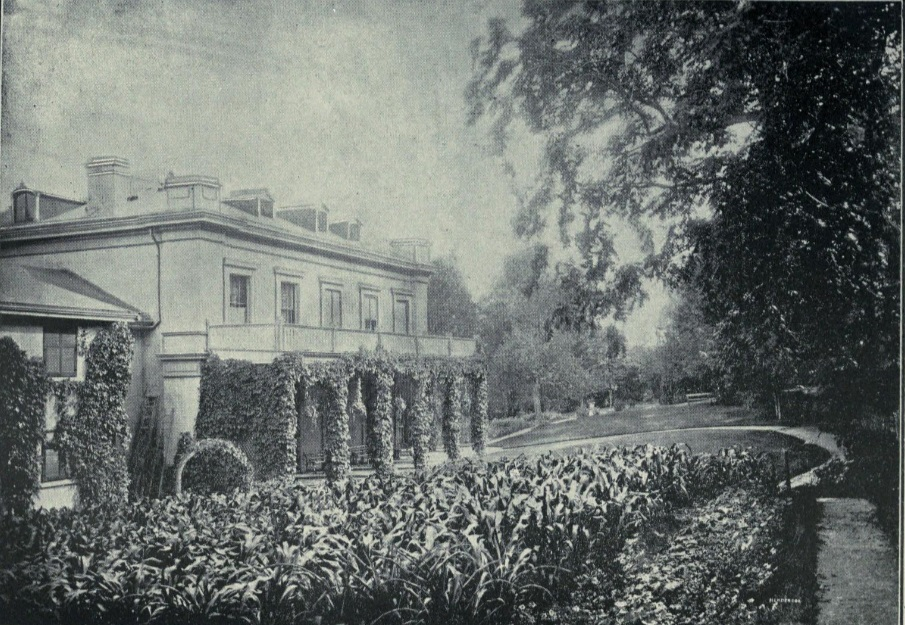
Rosemount House, McGregor Street, built by Sir John Rose on the land of Gov. Simpson in the Golden Square Mile

In August 1860, he entertained the Prince of Wales at Lachine, who came for the inauguration of Victoria Bridge, in honour of his mother Queen Victoria. Simpson built Prince of Wales Terrace in his honour. The building, made of a limestone facade in the Classical Greek style, consisted of a row of nine luxurious houses, and was inhabited by Sir William Christopher Macdonald and Mcgill University's Principal William Peterson. It was later demolished to make room for Samuel Bronfman's pavilion, which was seen by Alcan CEO David Culver as an unforgivable act of vandalism.

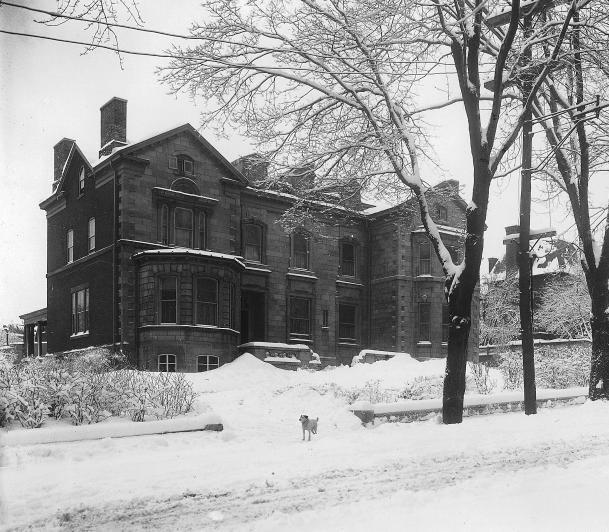
Galt House, Simpson Street, built by Sir Alexander Tilloch Galt on the land of Simpson in the Golden Square Mile

A street was named in his honor, called Simpson Street, next to Parc Percy-Walters, McGregor Street, and Maison John-Wilson-McConnell. The park was previously occupied by one of his houses, and was part of his 15 acre estate on Mount Royal. It was then occupied by Rosemount House, which was built on the land of Governor Simpson and was the home of Sir John Rose, 1st Baronet, and later William Watson Ogilvie. Galt House was also built on Simpson Street by Canadian Founding Father Sir Alexander Tilloch Galt. The entrance of Simpson Street is now occupied by Sir George Simpson Tower.

Both Simpson Street and Prince of Wales Terrace were in the Golden Square Mile, a neighbourhood of Downtown Montreal where nearly 3/4 of all the wealth in Canada was held by its inhabitants. During that era, most Canadian enterprises were either owned or controlled by approximately fifty men. As the most important man in the North American fur trade, he was one of them.

=== Legacy and death ===
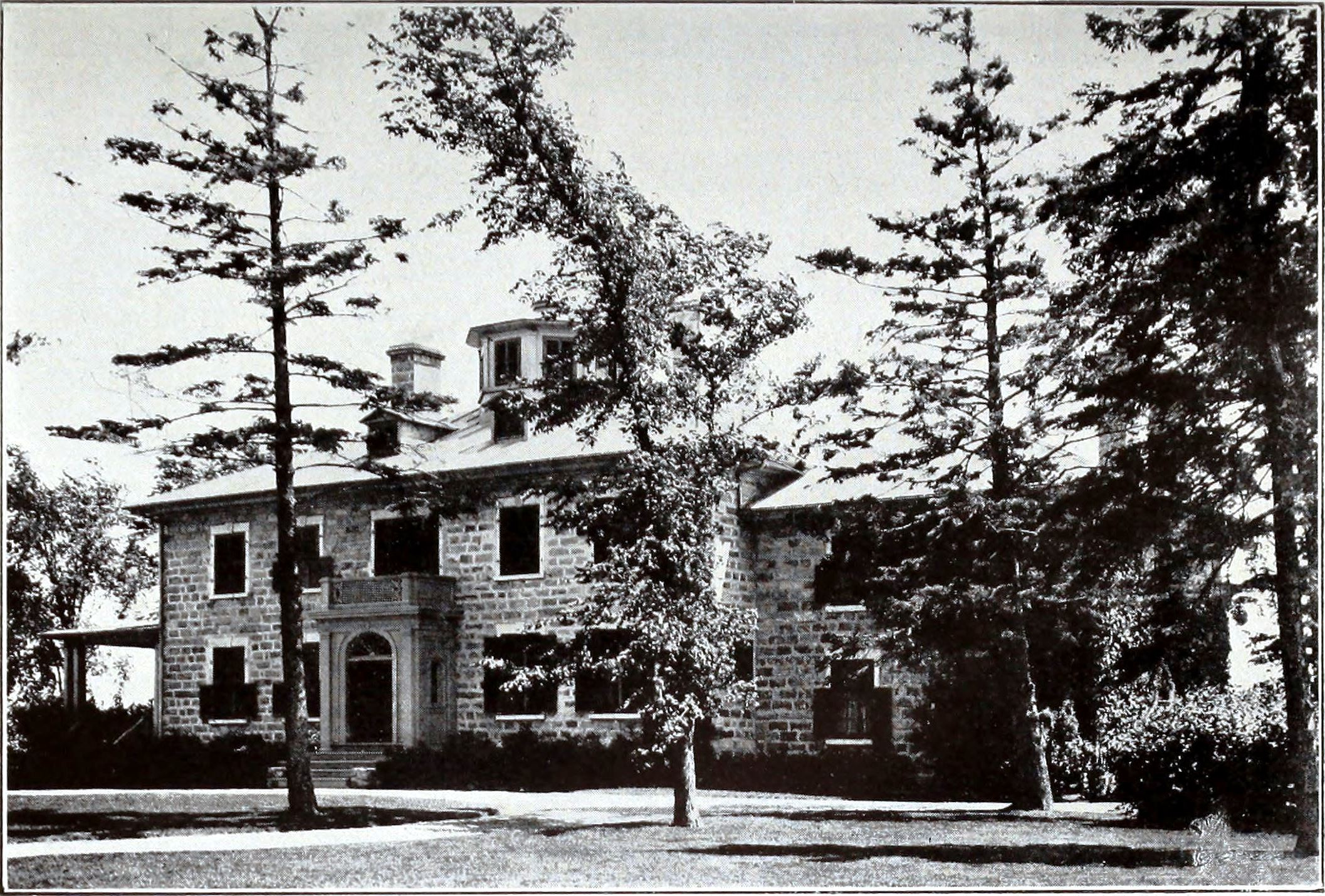
Sir George Simpson's manor in Coteau-du-lac, later sold to the Comte de Beaujeu and Mrs. De Gaspé.

Shortly after the Princes of Wales's visit, Governor Simpson suffered a massive stroke and died six days later in Lachine. At his death in 1860, he left an estate worth over £100,000, which in relation to GDP, amounted to half a billion dollars in 2023 Canadian money. The amount is also very similar to Harlaxton Manor's building cost. Simpson also gave money to the general endowment of McGill University in 1856, along with Peter McGill and Peter Redpath, among others.

James Raffan, author of Emperor of the North, was of the view that Simpson should be counted among Canada’s founding fathers for his role as Governor-in-chief of Rupert's Land, and its later merger in 1867 to form the Dominion of Canada. Rupert's Land territory was Canada's largest land acquisition to form modern Canada, and included land in Quebec, Ontario, Manitoba, Saskatchewan, Alberta, the Northwest Territories, Nunavut, Montana, Minnesota, and North and South Dakota. In newspapers and books, he has been referred as the King of the Fur-trade, the Emperor of the North, the Emperor of the Plains, the Emperor of Lachine, the Birch-bark Emperor, and the Little Emperor.

Simpson also had a passion for Napoleon, and was living during his lifetime. It was one of the passions of his life, collecting writing relating to his hero, covering his walls with Napoleonic prints at Lachine Depot, Norway House and Fort Garry, and infecting the factors and fur traders of the Hudson's Bay Company with them.

== Children ==
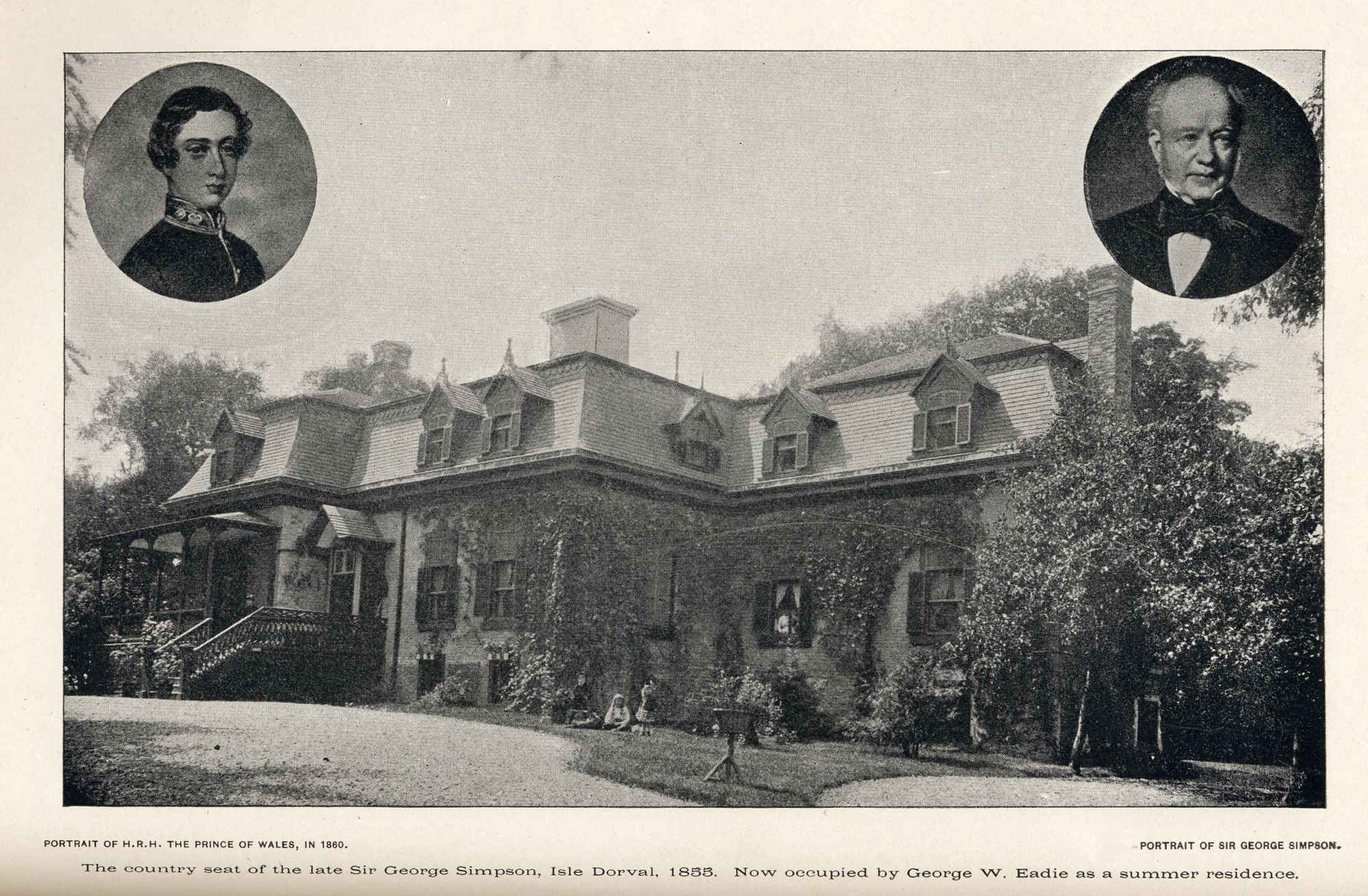
Sir George Simpson's residence on his island named L'Île-Dorval, acquired during the 19th century, where he received the Prince of Wales

Simpson sired at least eleven children by at least seven women, only one of whom was his wife.

During his years in London, he fathered two daughters, born to two separate women. Maria-Louisa, born 1815 to a mother named Maria, and Isabella, born 1817 to an unknown mother. Once Simpson left for Rupert's Land, both daughters were sent to Scotland to be cared for by his relatives.

Sometime during his first year in Rupert's Land, in about 1821, he met and began a relationship with Elizabeth "Betsey" Sinclair, a Métis washerwoman, who he likely met at Fort Wedderburn. He fathered one child with her, a daughter named Maria, who died at age 16 when she drowned while travelling to the Columbia District. Simpson ended their relationship when he began his 1822 trip westward, regarding her as an "unnecessary & expensive appendage" who was of little use to him while he was away travelling.

James Keith Simpson (1823–1901) is poorly documented. Ann Simpson, born in Montreal in 1828, is known only from her baptismal record. Simpson fathered two sons, George Stewart (1827) and John Mackenzie (1829), with Margaret (Marguerite) Taylor. George married Isabella Yale (1840–1927), daughter of fur trader James Murray Yale, of the Yale family. George was also the brother-in-law of Eliza Yale, wife of Capt. Henry Newsham Peers, grandson of Count Julianus Petrus de Linnée.

Soon after the birth of John Mackenzie, Simpson left Margaret to marry his cousin. Simpson shocked his peers by neglecting to notify Margaret of his marriage or make any arrangements for the future of his two sons.
