= Beaver (steamship) =

1836 paddle steamer, first steamship in the North Pacific

Coordinates: 49.314049°N 123.142175°W

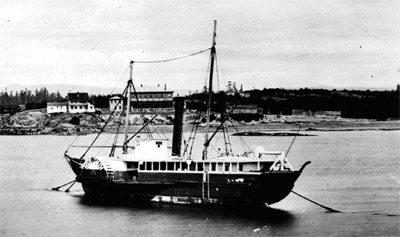
- Beaver about 1870

History

Canada
- Name: Beaver
- Builder: Wigram & Green, Blackwall Yard, London
- Laid down: London, England
- Launched: 9 May 1835
- In service: 1835-1888
- Fate: Wrecked 26 July 1888

General characteristics
- Type: Sidewheel paddle steamer
- Tonnage: 109 tons
- Length: 101 ft 9 in (31.01 m)
- Beam: 33 ft (10 m)
- Draft: 8 ft 6 in (2.59 m)
- Propulsion: Two 35 hp (26 kW) Boulton & Watt steam engines; Two 13 ft (4.0 m)diameter paddlewheels [42in bore and 36 inch stroke;2cyl]
- Sail plan: Brigantine
- Armament: 4 brass cannons

Beaver was a steamship originally owned and operated by the Hudson's Bay Company. She was the first steamship to operate in the Pacific Northwest of North America, and made remote parts of the west coast of Canada accessible for maritime fur trading. At one point she was chartered by the Royal Navy for surveying the coastline of British Columbia. She served off the coast from 1836 until 1888, when she was wrecked.

== Service ==
Beaver served trading posts maintained by the Hudson's Bay Company between the Columbia River and Russian America (Alaska) and played an important role in helping maintain British control in British Columbia during the Fraser Canyon Gold Rush of 1858–59. In 1862 the Royal Navy chartered her to survey and chart the coast of the Colony of British Columbia. She also provided assistance to the Royal Navy at Bute Inlet during the Chilcotin War.

== Loss ==
A consortium that became the British Columbia Towing and Transportation Company in 1874 purchased her, and used her as a towboat until 25 July 1888. On that day an inebriated crew ran her aground on rocks in Burrard Inlet at Prospect Point in Vancouver's Stanley Park. The wreck finally sank in July 1892 when the wake of the passing steamer Yosemite struck it, but only after enterprising locals had stripped much of the wreck for souvenirs. The Vancouver Maritime Museum houses a collection of Beaver remnants including the boiler and two drive shafts for the paddle wheels, one raised in the 1960s and the other returned from a collection in Tacoma, along with the boiler. A plaque commemorates the site of the sinking. Divers surveyed the wreck in the 1960s. However, when the Underwater Archaeological Society of BC did so in the 1990s, they found she had mostly disintegrated due to rot and currents.

== See also ==
- List of ships in British Columbia
- List of steamboats on the Columbia River
- Steamboats of the Columbia River
- William Henry McNeill

== Image gallery ==
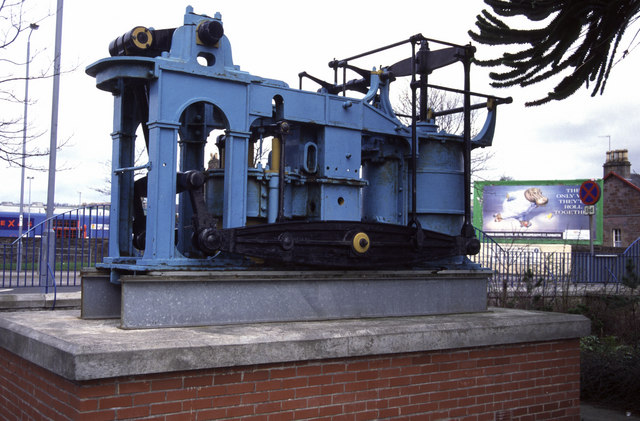
Side lever engine off PS Levan; Beaver's engine had two cylinders and was built by Boulton and Watt.

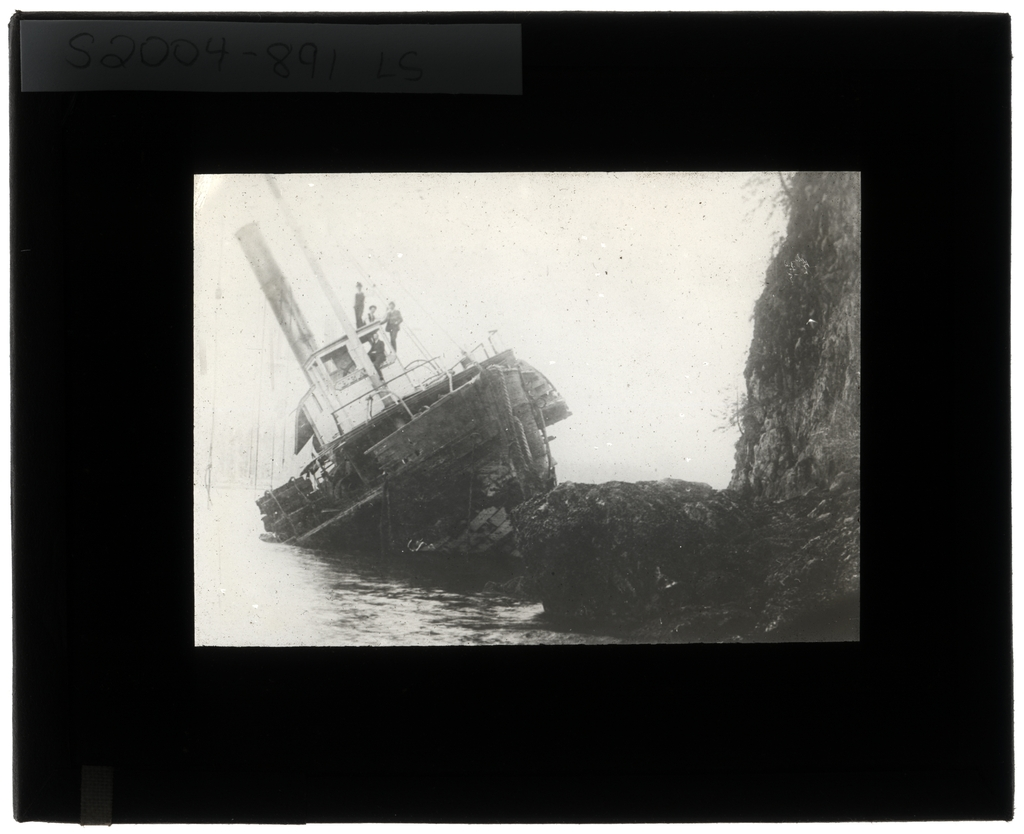
The wreck of S.S. Beaver

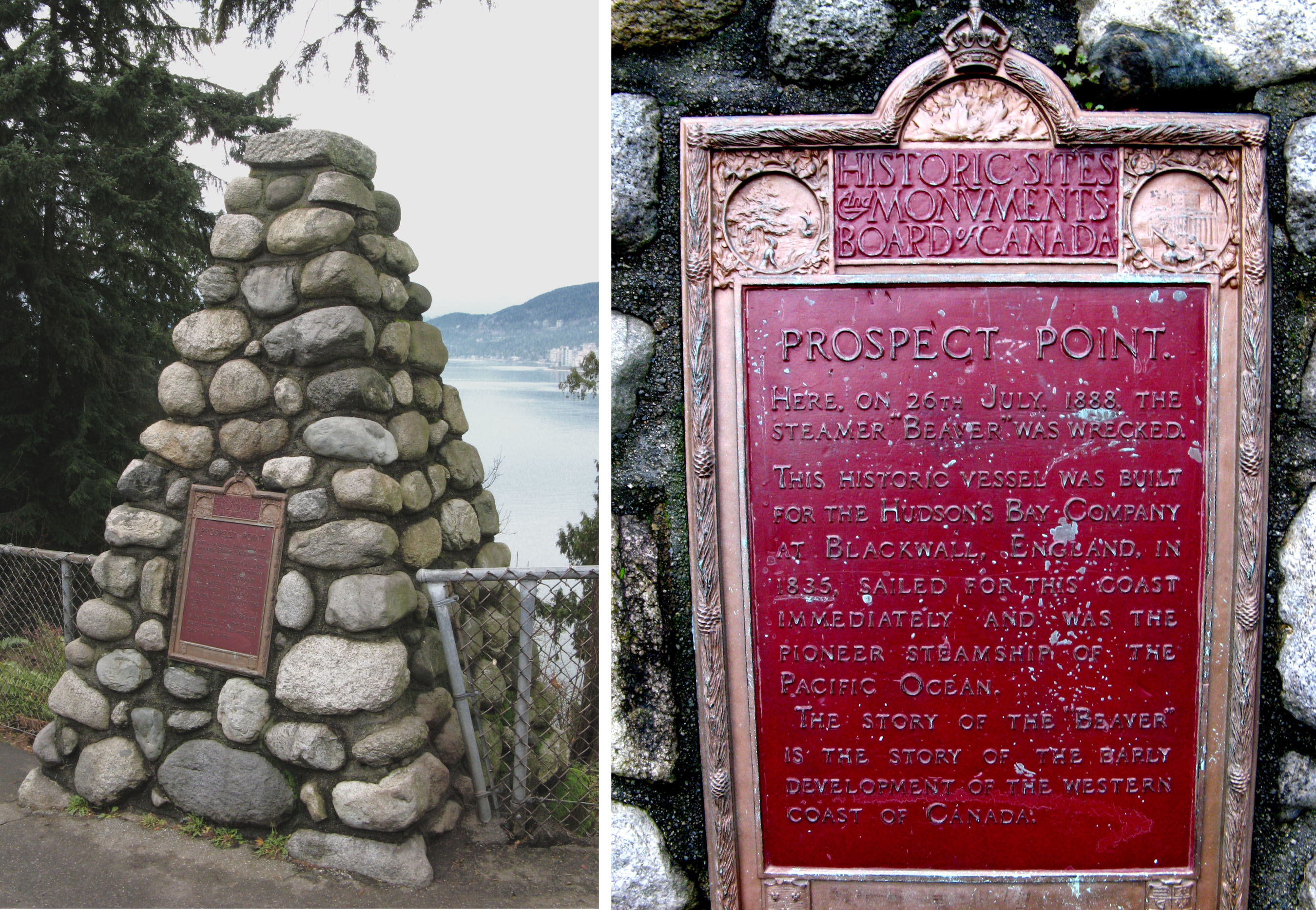
Plaque commemorating Beaver in Stanley Park, Vancouver.
