= Black Eagle Dam =

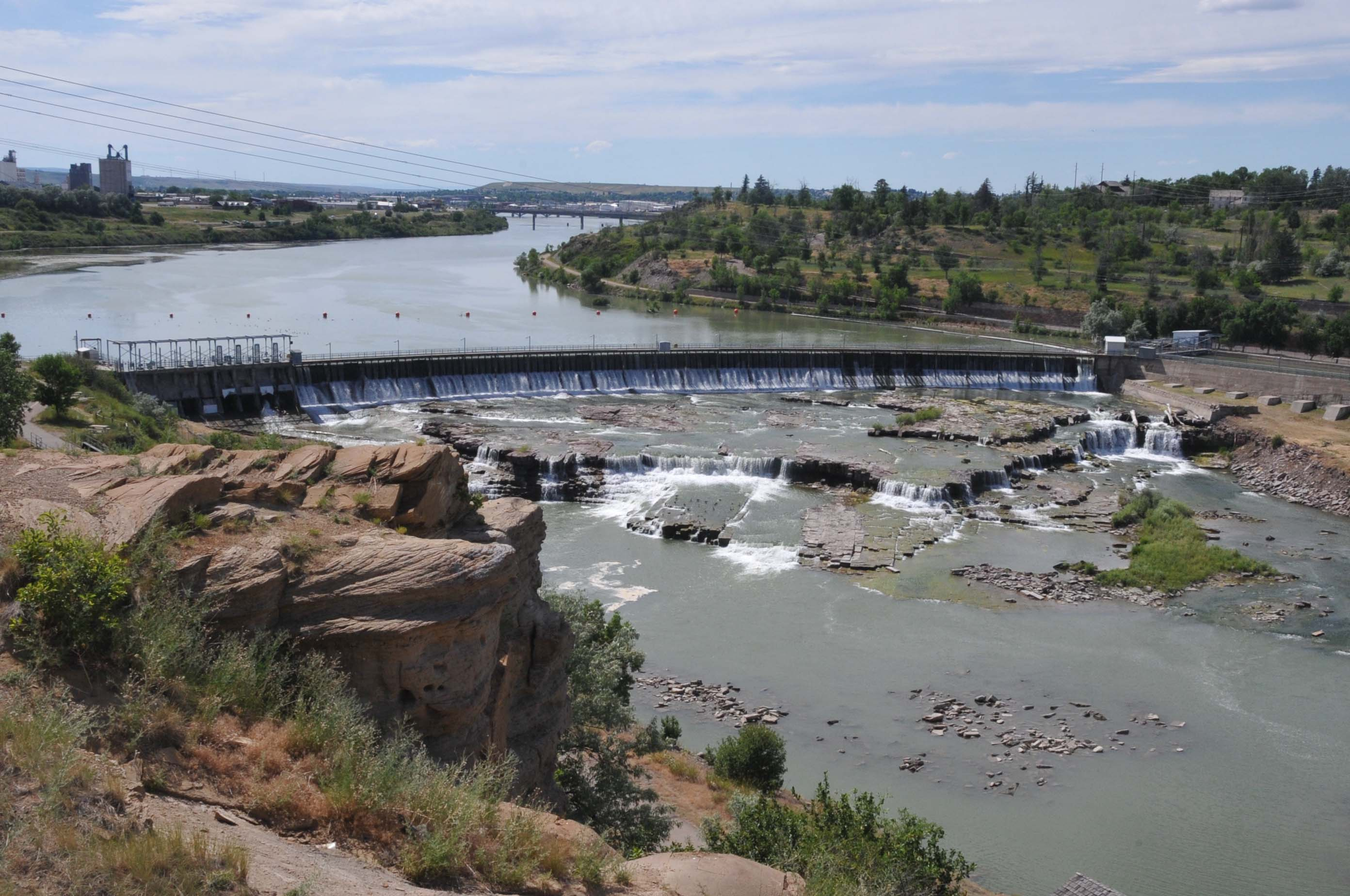
- Black Eagle Dam in 2013
- Interactive map of Black Eagle Dam
- Official name: Black Eagle Dam
- Location: Great Falls, Montana, U.S.
- Coordinates: 47°31′11″N 111°15′47″W
- Construction began: September 1890 (first dam); April 1926 (second dam)
- Opening date: December 1890 (first dam); September 1927 (second dam)
- Operator: NorthWestern Corporation

Dam and spillways
- Impounds: Missouri River
- Height: 34.5 feet (10.5 m) (second dam)
- Length: 782 feet (238 m) (second dam)

Reservoir
- Creates: Long Pool

Power Station
- Installed capacity: 18 MW
- Annual generation: 142,590,000 KWh (2009)

Black Eagle Dam is a hydroelectric gravity weir dam located on the Missouri River in the city of Great Falls, Montana. The first dam on the site, built and opened in 1890, was a timber-and-rock crib dam. This structure was the first hydroelectric dam built in Montana and the first built on the Missouri River. The dam helped give the city of Great Falls the nickname "The Electric City." A second dam, built of concrete in 1926 and opened in 1927, replaced the first dam, which was not removed and lies submerged in the reservoir. Almost unchanged since 1926, the dam is 782 feet (238 m) long and 34.5 feet (10.5 m) high, and its powerhouse contains three turbines capable of generating seven megawatts (MW) of power each. The maximum power output of the dam is 18 MW. Montana Power Company built the second dam, PPL Corporation purchased it in 1997 and sold it to NorthWestern Corporation in 2014. The reservoir behind the dam has no official name, but was called the Long Pool for many years. The reservoir is about 2 miles (3.2 km) long, and has a storage capacity of 1,710 acre-feet (2,110,000 m^{3}) to 1,820 acre-feet (2,240,000 m^{3}) of water.

The dam is a "run-of-the-river" dam because it can generate electricity without needing to store additional water supplies behind the dam.

== Black Eagle Falls ==
Black Eagle Falls is the first in a series of five waterfalls which constitute the Great Falls of the Missouri River in the state of Montana in the United States. Before being dammed, water dropped 26.42 feet (8.05 m) over the falls.

Black Eagle Falls formed on a fall line unconformity in the Great Falls Tectonic Zone. The Missouri River in this area flows over and through the Kootenai Formation, a mostly nonmarine sandstone laid down by rivers, glaciers, and lakes in the past. Some of the Kootenai Formation is marine, however, laid down by shallow seas. The river is eating away at the softer nonmarine sandstone, with the harder rock forming the falls themselves.

The Mandan and the South Piegan Blackfeet, among other Native Americans, knew of the falls. On June 13, 1805, Meriwether Lewis of the Lewis and Clark Expedition became the first white person to see the Great Falls (the largest of the five waterfalls). On the second day that the expedition camped near the series of falls, Meriwether Lewis discovered Black Eagle Falls. "I arrived at another cataract of 26 feet...below this fall at a little distance a beautiful little Island well timbered is situated about the middle of the river. in this Island on a Cottonwood tree an Eagle has placed her nest; a more inaccessible spot I believe she could not have found; for neither man nor beast dare pass those gulphs which separate her little domain from the shores. the water is also broken in such manner as it descends over this pitch that the mist or sprey rises to a considerable height. this fall is certainly much the greatest I ever beheld except those two which I have mentioned below. it is incomparably a greater cataract and a more noble interesting object than the celebrated falls of Potomac or Soolkiln &c." It is unclear which member of the expedition named the falls, but the expedition called them "Upper Pitch." The falls were eventually named for the black eagle which Lewis saw on June 14, 1805. In 1872, Thomas P. Roberts, a survey engineer for the Northern Pacific Railway, formally named the cataract "Black Eagle Falls" after the incident recorded in Lewis' journal.

=== 1890 dam ===
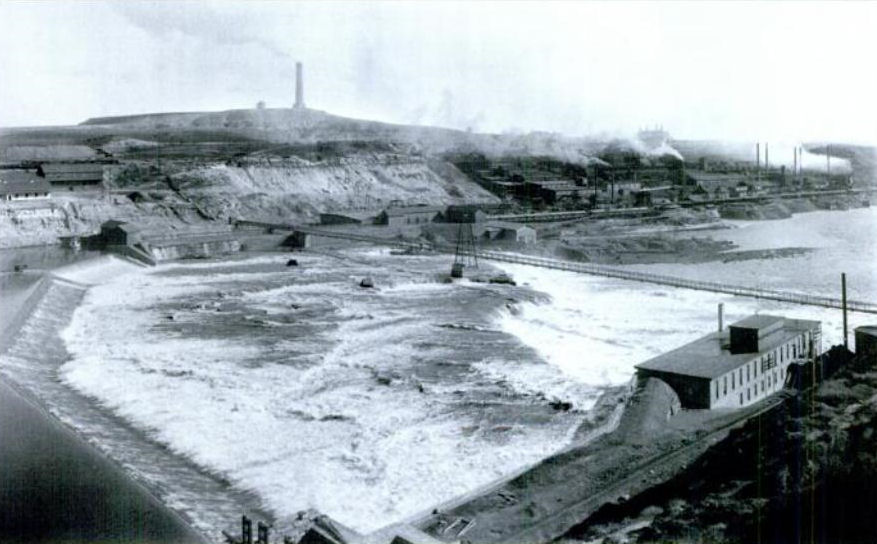
Looking northeast across Black Eagle Dam circa 1907. The south powerhouse is at the bottom of the image, and dam is at the left.

The Great Falls Water Power & Townsite Company was formed in 1887, with the goal of developing the town of Great Falls; providing it with power, sewage, and water; and attracting commerce and industry to the city. Railroad magnate James J. Hill organized the investors, who were primary owners of large amounts of stock in the Great Northern Railway. It was capitalized at $5 million. Hill sold stock to many of his friends, including Philip Danforth Armour, Charles Arthur Broadwater, Marshall Field, John Murray Forbes, Daniel Willis James, John Stewart Kennedy, Leonard Lewisohn and Charles Elliott Perkins. One of the stockholders in the Great Falls Water Power & Townsite Co. (GFWPTC) was Paris Gibson, a friend of Hill's and the driving force behind the founding of the city of Great Falls. Gibson realized that the Great Falls of the Missouri could provide abundant, cheap electricity for industry, and proceeded to promote the town on this basis. But Gibson's plan meant actually building one or more dams to supply the dreamt-of power. The company immediately began purchasing riverside land and water rights along the Missouri River from Black Eagle Falls down to Sheep Creek (a distance of about 12 miles (19 km)). In time, it owned almost all the land set aside for the city of Great Falls as well as an additional 5,000 acres (2,000 ha) of waterside property. GFWPTC employed J.T. Fanning, a hydraulic engineer, to survey Black Eagle Falls in the summer of 1887 to determine the suitability of the falls and the best location for a dam. Plans for a dam were drawn up, but no action was taken at that time.

Black Eagle Dam was built in order to supply power to a copper smelter. The Boston and Montana Consolidated Copper and Silver Mining Company was organized on July 22, 1887, by the merger of Leonard Lewisohn's Lewisohn Brothers (a copper trading company), the Montana Company (a mine holding company), and C. X. Larrabee (owner of the highly productive and famous Larrabee and Mountain View mines). On September 12, 1889, the Boston and Montana signed an agreement with GFWPTC in which the power company agreed to build a dam that would supply the mining firm with at least 1,000 horsepower (or 0.75 MW) of power by September 1, 1890, and 5,000 horsepower (or 3.73 MW) of power by January 1, 1891. In exchange, Boston and Montana agreed to build a $300,000 copper smelter near the dam.

Construction began on Black Eagle Dam in 1890. GFWPTC engineers designed a rock-and-timber crib weir overflow dam, in which dressed and shaped heavy timbers formed a closed structure filled with rock or rubble. The dam was not a large one. The goal was to merely create a pond behind the dam, which would create enough water pressure (or "head") to turn turbines and generate electricity. The dam was built at a cost of about $515,000 (roughly $12,335,000 in inflation-adjusted 2010 dollars) on the upstream brink of the falls (to create the deepest reservoir possible). Construction bids were opened on February 5, 1890, with the request for bids specifying that all work must be finished by December 1, 1890. All the bids were rejected, and mechanical engineer Maurice Parker was employed to design and construct the dam. Coffer dams were constructed in April 1890 to divert the river from the work areas. Work on the dam itself began on April 15. A shanty town named "River Bank" was constructed just upstream of the construction site on the north bank for the river to house the Croat, Scandinavian, Slovak, and Welsh workers who helped construct the dam. (Most of these workers helped found the town of Black Eagle, and earthen foundations for the shanty town can still be seen.) The red sandstone riverbed was leveled as much as possible, and large timbers bolted and cemented (perpendicular to the river's flow) to the rock. Each timber was 8 feet (2.4 m) from the next one downstream, and six cribs were built to form a dam 56.66 feet (17.27 m) deep at its base.The dam's downstream face had a pitch of 1.05:1. From the crest of the dam, a face (at a pitch of 1:08:1) extended for about 8 feet (2.4 m) before it became vertical. A 30-foot-high (9.1 m) masonry wall was built on the south end of the dam to form the foundation of and to protect the powerhouse, and the construction worked inward from either end of the dam. Every 48 feet (15 m) across the face of the dam, a 14-foot-wide (4.3 m) floodwater spillway made of concrete was created (for a total of eight spillways). Flashboards 1 foot (0.30 m) in height were installed along the entire top of the dam to add water storage capacity. The dam was 15 feet (4.6 m) high and 1,100 feet (340 m) long.

The dam began generating electricity in December 1890. Water was permitted to flow over the crest of the dam on January 6, 1891, and the dam was considered complete on March 15, 1891.

A two-story brick powerhouse, 40 by 165 feet (12 by 50 m), was built on the south side of the river. It contained three twin, horizontal "Victor" reaction turbines (to which up to six generators could be mounted), each of which generated 1.27 MW of power. The south bank and a masonry wall some distance offshore created a forebay (or short headrace) which fed the iron-enclosed penstocks, and water flow into the penstocks was partially controlled by a gate at the upstream end of the forebay. The main penstock was 400 feet (120 m) long and 9 feet (2.7 m) in diameter, and fed water to the turbines. (Three other penstocks were built but not put into use immediately.)

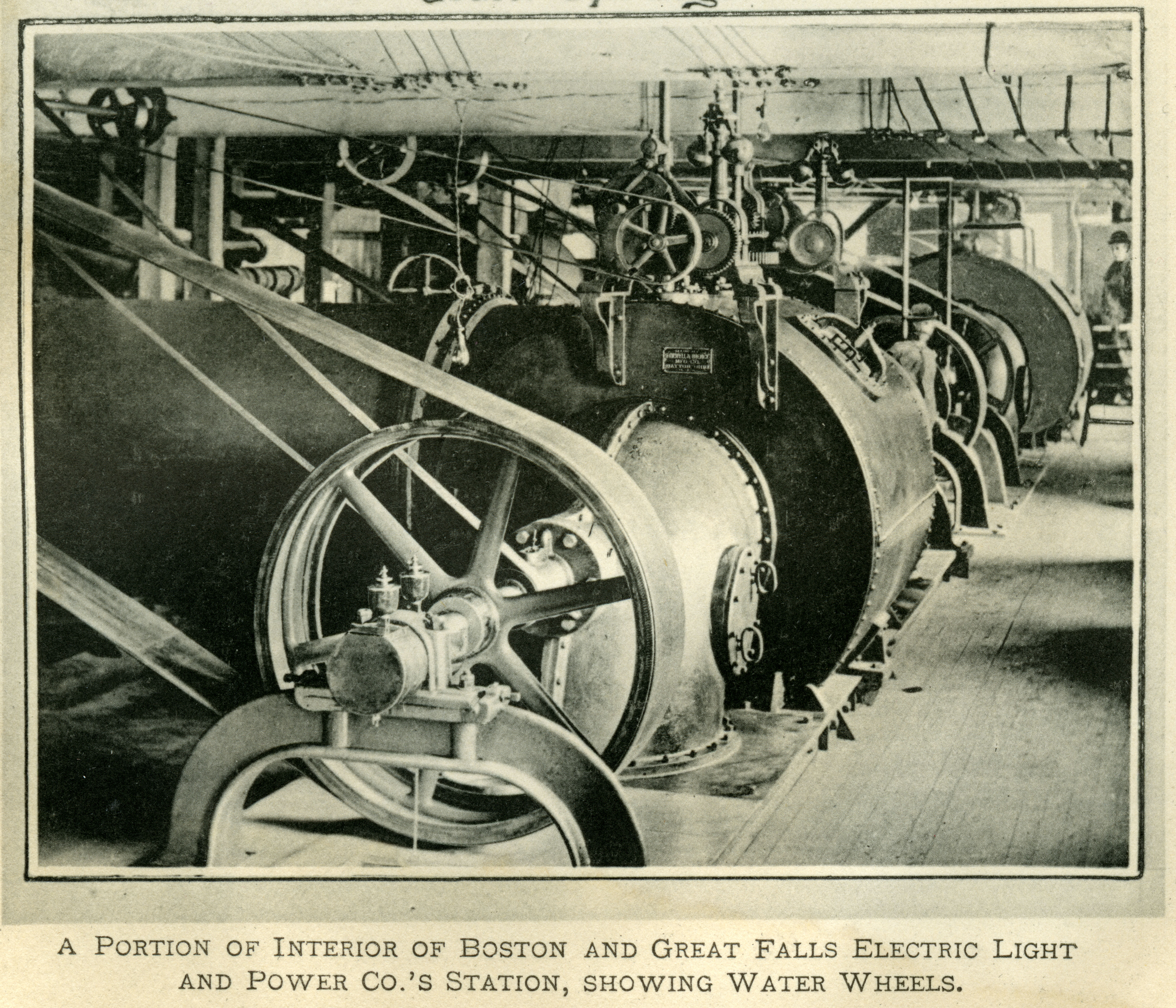
The interior of the north bank powerhouse at Black Eagle Dam, showing the ropes and pulleys used to transfer mechanical power to the smelter.

On the north side of the river was another powerhouse (completed in 1892), which contained seven more Victor turbines, capable of generating a total of 1.94 MW of power. Rock and debris carved from the river bottom was piled near the north bank to create a small island (Tailrace Island), and the powerhouse was built on this manmade shore. The island and the north bank of the Missouri River formed the tailrace (or channel for water leaving the powerhouse) of Black Eagle Dam. Tailrace Island was jointly owned by the power company and the Boston and Montana. A wooden pedestrian bridge was built to the island to connect the powerhouse with the smelter above. The north bank and a masonry wall offshore formed a long, concrete-lined forebay (100 feet (30 m) across at its widest part) for the northern powerhouse. The flow of water into this forebay was also controlled by gates. Three iron-enclosed penstocks were built to feed the northern powerhouse. The mechanical power generated by the turbines in the north powerhouse was not converted into electricity, however. Most of the power was transferred mechanically to the smelter's equipment via a system of ropes and pulleys.

Thomson-Houston generators were used to transform some of the mechanical energy generated by the two powerhouses into electricity. A single person could operate the powerhouse during an eight-hour shift. A secondary powerhouse, which contained an Armington & Sims steam-powered turbine and generator, was built next to the south powerhouse and used to provide electricity to clients whenever the main turbines were shut off. A 200-foot-long (61 m) funicular (or inclined railway) provided access to the south powerhouse from the bluff above. A 200-foot-long (61 m), 10-foot-wide (3.0 m) pedestrian suspension bridge ran from the bluffs above each powerhouse over the river. The dam's life expectancy was estimated at 50 years.

==== 1890 dam operational history ====
Ground was broken on the smelter in the spring of 1890. The concentrator opened in March 1891; Brückner cylinders and reverberatory furnaces in April 1892; converters in August 1892; refining furnaces in January 1893; an electrolytic refinery in February 1893; and blast furnaces in April 1893. The cost of the original plant was $2 million, and by 1892 more than 1,000 workers were employed at the smelter. On April 7, 1908, construction began on the "Big Stack," a chimney for dispersal of fumes 506 feet (154 m) high, with an interior measurement of 78.5 feet (23.9 m) in diameter at the base and 50 feet (15 m) in diameter at the top. Built by the Alphonse Custodis Construction Co. of New York, it was completed on October 23, 1908, and was the tallest chimney in the world when finished.

In 1893–1894, GFWPTC constructed a second powerhouse just downstream of its existing south bank powerhouse. This powerhouse mechanically transferred power to the Royal Milling Company flour mill on the bluff above. In 1897, GFWPTC built yet another powerhouse (this time next to its north bank powerhouse) to supply even more power to the smelter above.

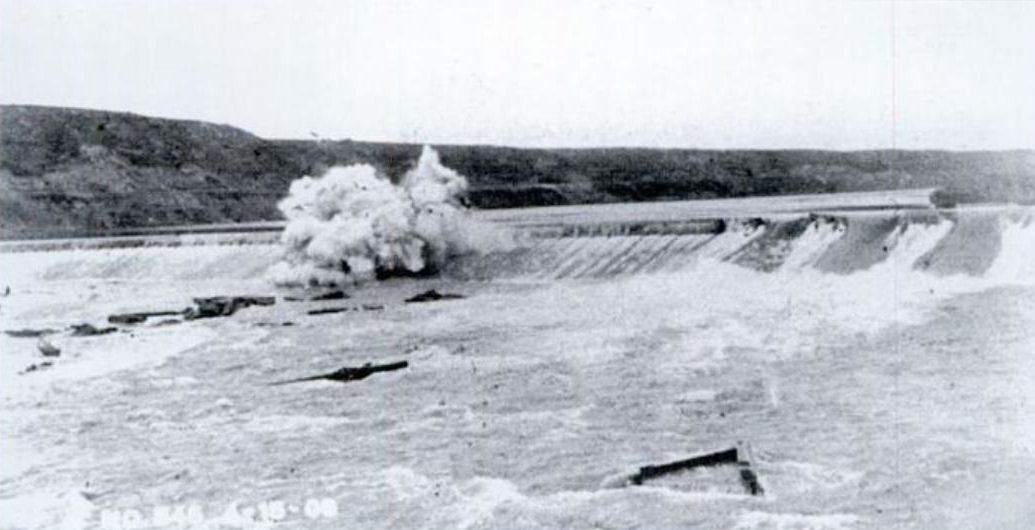
Black Eagle Dam is dynamited on April 14, 1908, to allow floodwaters from collapsed Hauser Dam to pass.

On April 14, 1908, at about 2:30 PM, Hauser Dam—a steel dam about 90 miles upstream from Great Falls— failed. A surge of water 25 feet (7.6 m) to 30 feet (9.1 m) high swept downstream. A Great Northern Railway locomotive was dispatched to the city of Great Falls, warning stations along the way about the dam break. Workers at the Boston and Montana Smelter in Great Falls improvised a wing dam to deflect the floodwaters away from the smelter site and dynamited a portion of Black Eagle Dam to allow the floodwaters to go downstream. Their efforts were not needed, as the Missouri River only rose 7 feet (2.1 m) by the time it reached that city. Two deaths occurred while the dynamiting attempt was made, however: One man drowned while trying to remove flashboards from the dam, and another drowned when his boat capsized.

Just two months later, on June 6, Black Eagle Dam suffered damage in yet another flood. Almost 3 inches (7.6 cm) of rain fell in 24 hours, and the Missouri River rose by almost 16 inches (41 cm) in eight hours. The Missouri River rose 8.1 feet (2.5 m) above flood stage (which itself was 15 feet (4.6 m) above the median water level). Five people in the city drowned. The Boston and Montana smelter toppled four fully loaded railroad cars into the Missouri just north of Black Eagle Dam in an attempt to divert the floodwaters from the plant. The worst flood in the city's history at the time, several buildings in town were also washed away. They smashed against Black Eagle Dam, and some went over the dam to break up on the waterfalls below. The pedestrian suspension bridge over the dam also washed out. (A plaque was placed on the 6th Street underpass to mark the extent of the high water. It can be seen there today.) The dam itself suffered some damage as well. This damage was repaired, and the old wooden bridge to Tailrace Island replaced with a single-span steel Warren truss bridge capable of handling automobiles. The island now began to also serve as a parking lot for powerhouse and smelter workers.

Ownership of the dam changed twice in the second decade of the 20th century. In 1908, John D. Ryan (president of the Daly Bank and Trust Co. in Butte and the Anaconda Copper Company, and a future Assistant Secretary of War) purchased most of the shares in the GFWPTC. In 1910, GFWPTC organized a subsidiary, the Great Falls Power Co., to take over ownership and operation of Black Eagle Dam and its other hydroelectric properties (then being built). A second ownership change occurred in 1912. Cost overruns on Holter Dam, waning investor enthusiasm for dam-building, and the liability associated with the collapse of Hauser Dam nearly drove Samuel Thomas Hauser, the largest shareholder in the United Missouri River Power Company (owner of Hauser and Holter) into bankruptcy. Hauser sold his interest in United Missouri River Power to John D. Ryan, who on October 25, 1912, merged United Missouri River Power with the Great Falls Power Co., Butte Electric and Power Company, Billings and Eastern Montana Power Company, and Madison River Power Company to form the Montana Power Company. That same year, most of Black Eagle Dam's power (3.9 MW to 5.7 MW) was delivered to the new smelter. In comparison, only about 0.7 MW was delivered to the nearby city. Another 300 horsepower of mechanical energy was created by a water wheel and delivered physically, through a rope and pulley system, to the Royal Milling Co.

In 1913, Montana Power upgraded Black Eagle Dam to generate more electrical (rather than mechanical) power. It abandoned its second powerhouse on the south bank, and installed two Leffel turbines. The old generators in the first powerhouse were replaced with two new ones capable of generating 1.5 MW each. Two surge chambers were built in the powerhouse as well, and a penstock connected to each chamber. The refurbished south powerhouse now provided power to the smelter, as well as to the flour mill (which had been converted to electricity).

=== 1926 dam ===
In 1909, engineers for Great Falls Power Co. proposed building dams at Rainbow Falls (Rainbow Dam) and the Great Falls (Ryan Dam), and a third dam (Cochrane Dam) between the other two in a canyon of the Missouri River. In 1914, Montana Power considered raising the height of Black Eagle Dam to increase its power generation capacity. In 1916, much of the Boston and Montana smelter plant was replaced by a modern copper and zinc smelter, and a wire and cable manufacturing plant was added. But Black Eagle Dam, even with upgrades to its turbines and other power generation equipment, still only generated about three MW of electricity. More power was required. By the early 1920s, the needs of the city of Great Falls had outstripped Black Eagle Dam's ability to generate electricity, and the smelter was planning a new electrolytic zinc manufacturing plant that would require 10 MW of power. By 1925, the north powerhouses were seriously outdated.

The Montana Power Company began planning for a new dam and powerhouse in late 1925. The Charles T. Main Company oversaw the redevelopment of the dam. Harry Cochrane, Montana Power's chief consulting engineer, supervised the dam's redesign (nearby Cochrane Dam is named after him). On April 1, 1926, the company announced it would spend $1 million to build a new powerhouse at Black Eagle Dam. But as work progressed, the engineers realized that the dam and its four powerhouses were too outdated to meet power generation needs. The company adjusted its plans, and planned for an entirely new dam to be built 50 feet (15 m) downstream from the first dam. The south forebay would be abandoned, while the north forebay would be retained (and significantly rehabilitated). The 1897 north bank powerhouse was demolished, and a new, concrete powerhouse built on the same location. The design and location of the new powerhouse was influenced by the company's experiences during the June 1908 flood (during which its south bank powerhouses had been flooded and damaged).

Work began that summer with the removal of the south bank powerhouses. The existing dam was used as a coffer dam while workers poured concrete for the new dam. The new dam was finished on August 1, 1927, and began generating electricity in September. The new dam's reservoir completely drowned the old dam behind it.

The new dam was 782 feet (238 m) long and 34.5 feet (10.5 m) high, with a spillway 646 feet (197 m) long. Its height was limited by the city's freshwater and sewage facilities, which were just upstream from the dam and would be inundated if the dam were any higher. The dam had an ogee-shaped crest to permit improved water flow over the top.

The new dam also had eight floodgates, and a pedestrian walkaway with railing was along the dam's crest to give maintenance workers access to the flashboards and dam.

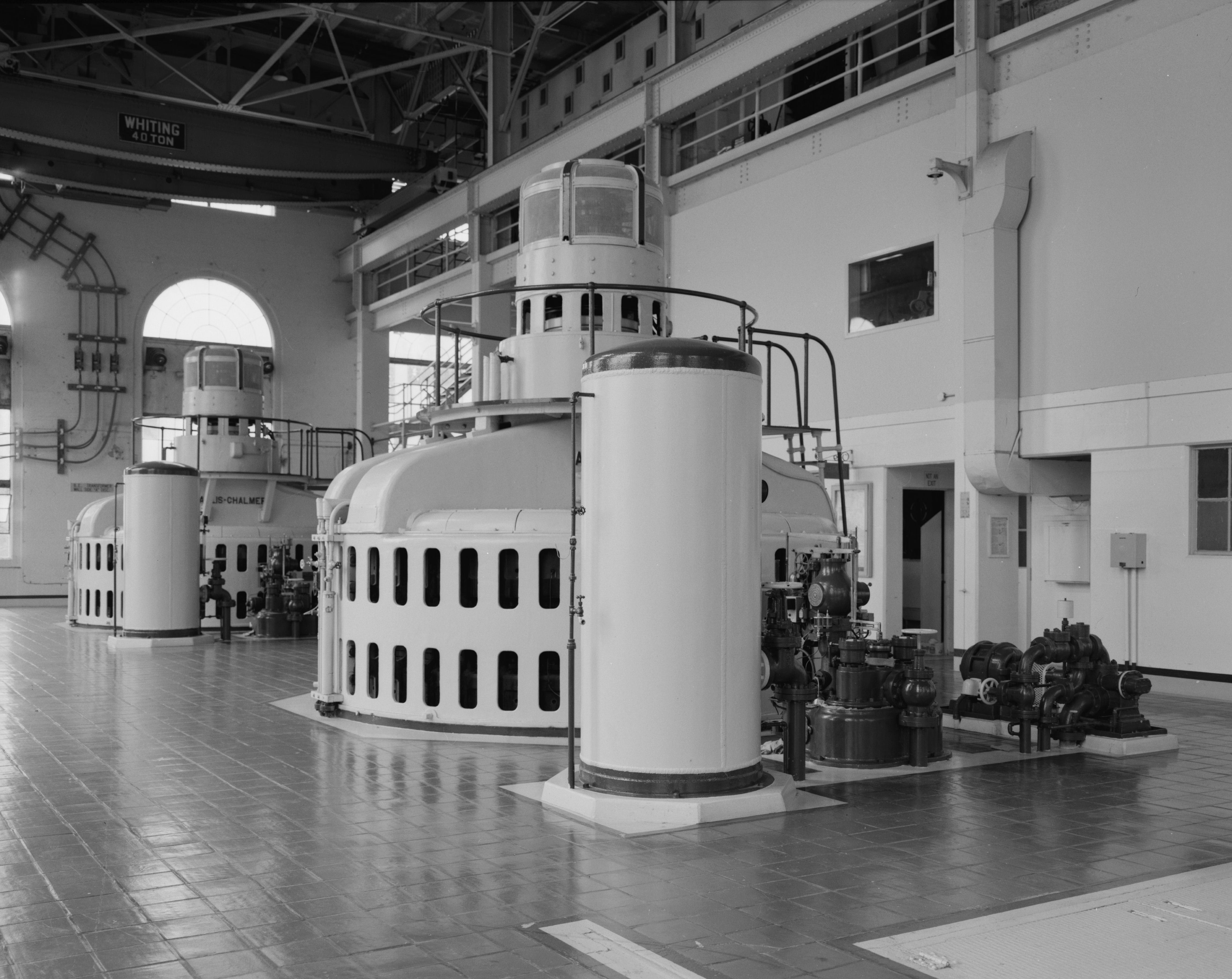
Turbines in the Black Eagle Dam north bank powerhouse in 1996.

The dam's new powerhouse was concrete. The company had planned to build a brick powerhouse. But local bricklayers demanded that they be paid the salary offered by the city rather than the lower rate offered by Montana Power. The company refuse to hire the workers, and built the structure of concrete instead. Concrete and masonry retaining walls north and south of the powerhouse were also built to help prevent erosion of the riverbank into the forebay and tailrace. The new forebay was 421 feet (128 m) long and 96 feet (29 m) wide. The forebay was slightly extended downstream to the new powerhouse, and brick arches of the old powerhouse incorporated into the forebay's walls. The new powerhouse contained three vertical Kaplan turbines (supplied by the S. Morgan Smith Company) capable of generating 18 MW of power, which gave Black Eagle the largest generating capacity of any of Montana Power's five dams in the Great Falls area. The Smith company also made the oil-pressure governors (which regulated each turbine's speed) and draft tubes (which slowed the water down as it left the turbine, allowing the faster-moving water above to keep imparting energy to the turbine's propellers). The scroll-shaped inlets and wicket gates around the turbines were cemented into the powerhouse's basement, and each turbine installed in its own pit. Each turbine connected through the first floor roof to an Allis-Chalmers generator rated at 7,000 kVA. DC generators acted as exciters for the Allis-Chalmers generators. Six 6,600/2,200 volt transformers stepped down the power for usage.

Black Eagle Dam suffered four major floods after its 1926 reconstruction, but survived them all. The first major flood occurred on June 4, 1953, when early spring rains and sudden snowmelt caused the Missouri River to rise 4.1 feet (1.2 m) above flood stage. No damage to the dam was reported. On June 10, 1964, heavy rains in the Rocky Mountains caused the Missouri River to rise 9.6 feet (2.9 m) above flood stage—1.5 feet (0.46 m) higher than the 1908 flood. Swift Dam on Birch Creek collapsed, killing 19 people. Lower Two Medicine Lake Dam also collapsed, killing nine. Although 3,000 people were forced out of their homes in Great Falls due to heavy flooding, the 1964 event did no damage to Black Eagle Dam. (Mel Ruder was awarded a Pulitzer Prize for Breaking News Reporting for his coverage of the flood.) A third major flood occurred on June 21, 1975. More than 2 inches (5.1 cm) of rain fell in the Rocky Mountains in a 24-hour period. More than 5,000 people were evacuated from their homes in Great Falls after the Sun River rose to 21 feet (6.4 m) (6 feet (1.8 m) above flood stage). More than $17 million in damage occurred, and 21,000 acres (8,500 ha) were submerged. Floodwaters almost overwhelmed Black Eagle Dam, but no damage to the structure occurred. A fourth major flood hit on June 17, 1997. Heavy, swift snowmelt caused the Missouri River to rise 3 feet (0.91 m) above flood stage. But no damage to the dam was reported. Black Eagle Dam is also equipped with an emergency "trip face" that releases all the flashboards on the dam so that up to 100,000 cubic feet (2,800 m^{3}) per second of water can pass over the dam.

== The Long Pool ==
Black Eagle Dam created a reservoir about 2 miles (3.2 km) long behind it. The reservoir behind the first dam was about 17 feet (5.2 m) deep immediately behind the dam, and contained 459.1 acre-feet (566,300 m^{3}) of water behind it. The current dam has a storage capacity of 1,710 acre-feet (2,110,000 m^{3}) to 1,820 acre-feet (2,240,000 m^{3}) of water.

The reservoir formed behind Black Eagle Dam has no official name. However, due to the slow current, stillness of the water, and low incline of the water from the upriver town of Cascade to Black Eagle Falls (a distance of about 55 miles (89 km) along the winding Missouri River), this body of water has long been known as the "Long Pool." Thomas P. Roberts, who named Black Eagle Falls, gave this body of water its name in 1872. The United States Army Corps of Engineers referred to it by this name beginning at least as early as 1883, and as recently as 1910. The Montana Legislature has used the name, and the name was in popular use as early as 1891 and as late as 1917. Modern historians have referred to it as such, and it was in use by power industry publications as late as 1949. Today, the area from the 1st Avenue North Bridge to the confluence of the Missouri with the Sun River (a distance of about 1 mile (1.6 km)) is known as Broadwater Bay (after Charles Arthur Broadwater, the noted Montana railroad executive, real estate investor, and banker).

== Operation of the dam ==
After the dam's reconstruction in 1926, workers and local people were permitted to walk across the top of the dam as a means of getting to work and school. For security reasons, the Montana Power Company closed the dam to such foot traffic during World War II and never allowed it to resume afterward.

Montana Power was forced to license Black Eagle Dam and most of its other hydroelectric dams under the Federal Power Act in 1950. The controversy arose in December 1937 when the Federal Power Commission (FPC) began a proceeding (FPC Docket #IT-5840) to license all dams built prior to 1935 (the year the Federal Power Act became law). The act gave the Federal Power Commission the authority to license all dams on navigable waters in the United States. After almost a decade of extensive research and data collection as well as unfruitful negotiations, a hearing began before an FPC trial examiner on November 18, 1946, to determine whether the rivers where Montana Power had constructed dams prior to 1935 were navigable and therefore should be licensed under the act. In Opinion No. 170, issued on September 30, 1947, the trial examiner found that the rivers in question were navigable and the dams (including Black Eagle Dam) should be licensed. The company appealed to the full FPC, which began holding hearings on February 16, 1948. When the full FPC found against Montana Power, the company appealed to the United States Court of Appeals for the District of Columbia Circuit. On October 4, 1950, Judge David L. Bazelon, writing for a 2-to-1 majority, held in Montana Power Co. v. Federal Power Commission that "the 263 mile stretch of the Missouri River from Fort Benton to Three Forks is a 'navigable water of the United States,' and hence subject to the licensing requirements of the Federal Power Act." The court of appeals held that Black Eagle, Morony, Rainbow, and Ryan dams were on navigable waters and occupied public land without any authority. Hauser Dam was on navigable waters and held an invalid license to occupy public land. Holter Dam had a valid license, but that license did not extend to the navigable waters which it used. Hebgen and Madison dams were on non-navigable waters, but occupied public land without a valid license. The court of appeals remanded the issue of Canyon Ferry Dam back to the district court, as that dam had recently been sold to the federal government. Montana Power appealed the decision to the Supreme Court of the United States, which denied certiorari (refused to hear the case) in March 1951. Montana Power subsequently sought and won licenses for Black Eagle Dam and the seven others required to do so by the court's ruling. (Black Eagle dam was relicensed by the Federal Energy Regulatory Commission, the successor agency to the FPC, on September 27, 2000 for 40 years. The license, number P-2188, is for PPL's entire Upper Missouri-Madison project.)

The three Allis-Chalmers generators were rewound in 1978, and again in 1982. In 1997, Montana Power repainted and renovated the Tailrace Island bridge.

On November 2, 1999, Montana Power announced it was selling all of its dams and other electric power generating plants to PPL, Inc. for $1.6 billion. The sale, which included Black Eagle Dam, was expected to generate $30 million in taxes for the state of Montana (although MPC said the total would be lower). In November 2001, citizens of Montana—upset with energy price increases announced by PPL—sought passage of a ballot initiative that would have required the state to buy all of PPL's hydroelectric dams in Montana, including Black Eagle Dam. Montana voters rejected the initiative in November 2002.

At the time Montana Power sold Black Eagle Dam to PPL, Montana Power was installing controls that would allow the dam to be remotely operated from Rainbow Dam. At that time, PPL Montana said it had no plans to expand electrical generation capacity at Black Eagle Dam. Also in 1999, Montana Power turned most of Tailrace Island over to the city of Great Falls for use as a recreation area. In addition, Montana Power and ARCO (the successor company to the Boston and Montana) laid 18 inches (46 cm) of topsoil on the island, spent $500,000 to landscape it and enhance the safety perimeter around the powerhouse, and agreed to fund a portion of the island's annual upkeep.

In the late 1990s, historian Stephen Ambrose suggested removing Black Eagle Dam to restore the falls to their original condition.

Refurbishment of power generation and transmission systems at Black Eagle Dam began in 2010. In June of that year, PPL Montana initiated a $55 million effort to replace overhead power lines connecting the dam to the area's electric grid. The new power lines (which replaced equipment more than 80 years old) were more widely spaced apart, to permit large birds to pass safely through or perch on the power lines. PPL also said it was replacing the electrical substation next to the dam's powerhouse. Both projects are expected to be complete in 2012.

=== Sediment, water flows, debris issues, and emergencies ===
Sediment load carried by the Missouri River and its tributaries is a problem for Black Eagle Dam. The Sun River joins the Missouri River just a few miles upstream from Black Eagle Dam. The Sun River has long been derisively referred to as the "Scum River" due to the heavy load of sediment, nutrients, and unhealthy aquatic plant growth (such as algae) it contains. The Sun River is the color of chocolate milk where it enters the relatively blue waters of the Missouri, and it leaves the Missouri noticeably muddier. Silt has reduced the reservoir's capacity, filled up the forebay, and caused damage to the powerplant. In 1988, the Montana Department of Environmental Quality (MDEQ) listed the Missouri River from the Sun River to Rainbow Dam (just downstream from Black Eagle Dam) as "impaired" under Section 303(d) of the 1972 Clean Water Act due to sediment and suspended solids in the river. Black Eagle Dam (which slows the water and allows sediment to fall to the bottom of the reservoir) has been listed as one of the contributing sources of this problem. To combat this problem, in 1994 seven federal agencies, eight state agencies, 10 local Montana governments, four environmental organizations, and several Montana landowners began working together to reduce nutrient and sediment flows into the Sun River and its primary tributaries (Muddy Creek and Careless Creek). About $623,500 of Clean Water Act funds, $2 million in other federal funds, and $2.5 million in state and local funds were used to restore streambank vegetation, improve streamside grazing practices, restore sloping to streambanks, and improve irrigation practices. The program has seen success: By 2010, after just four years of abatement, sediment load dropped by 75 percent in Muddy Creek and 25 percent in Careless Creek.

Black Eagle Falls are not always flowing due to the needs of Black Eagle Dam. Typical median water flows of 11,200 cubic feet (320 m^{3}) per second occur in the Missouri River in May of each year. In October 2000, water levels behind the dam were drawn down and the falls shut off for about four weeks while PPL Montana made repairs to the forebay, gates, forebay, and penstock screens. PPL Montana's license for the dam requires it to send at least 200 cubic feet (5.7 m^{3}) per second of water over Black Eagle Dam between 9 A.M. and 8 P.M. on weekends and holidays between Memorial Day and Labor Day, although water may flow (and flow at higher rates) if the dam's power generation requirements and water levels permit it. In May 2001, PPL Montana said it would shut down Black Eagle Falls after July 4 because of water flows only about 40 percent of normal. Reservoir levels were lowered again in September 2004 to repair flashboards. The lack of water exposed the Missouri's original channel near Giant Springs. The reservoir was drawn down again and the falls turned off in June and July 2008. Flashboards on the dam were removed after a heavy rain to allow runoff to pass over the dam. Once the runoff passed, the flashboards were replaced. But little water remained in the reservoir and river, and the falls ran dry for several days until the reservoir filled again.

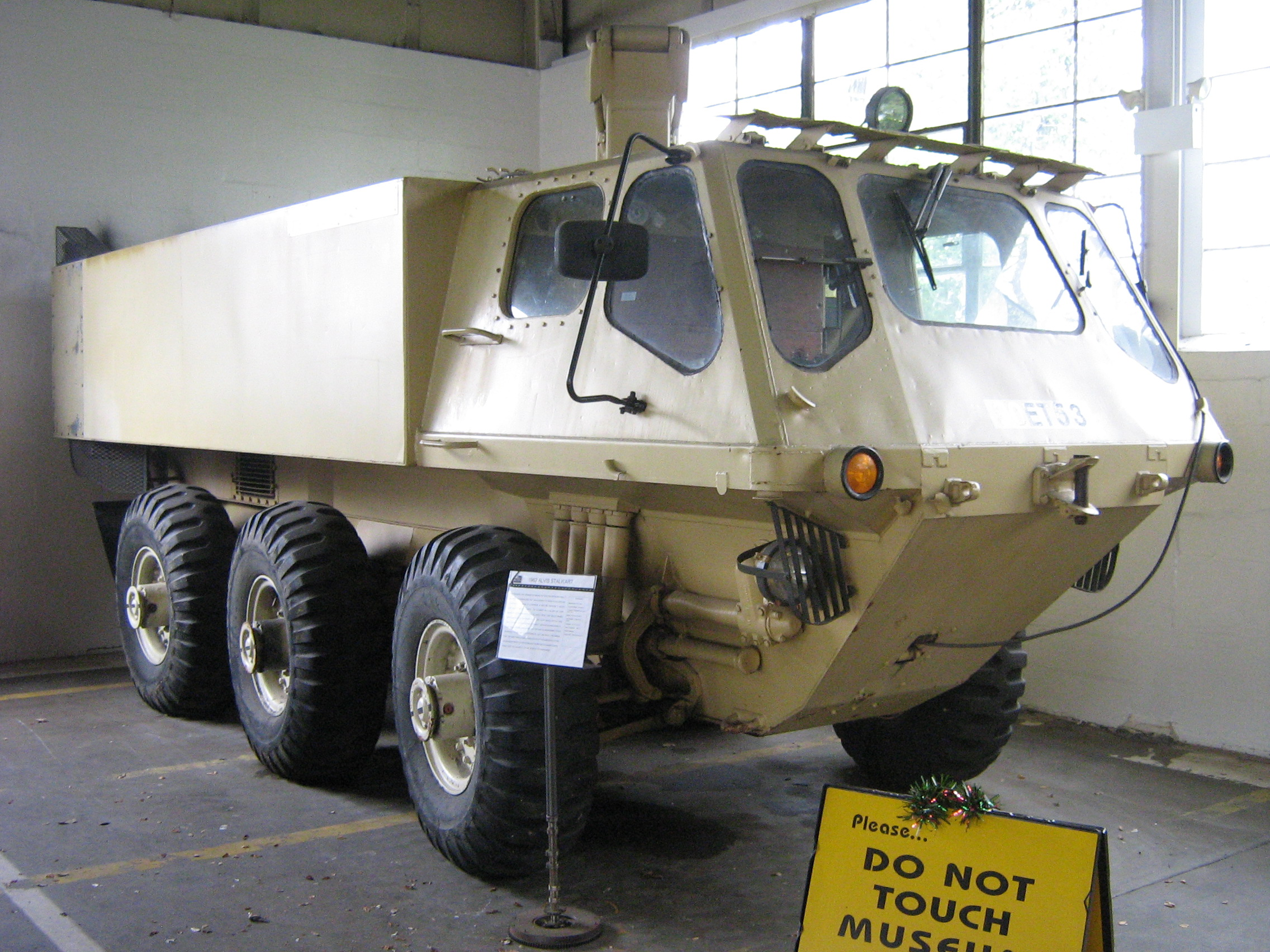
An Alvis Stalwart, used for amphibious maintenance at Black Eagle Dam.

Because Black Eagle Dam is an overflow dam, it is common for debris to jam against the dam or obstruct the penstock intakes. Driftwood and logs are the most common forms of debris, but unusual objects such as boat docks, bowling balls, canoes, hot tubs, and small wooden and steel sheds and buildings also sometimes become lodged against the dam. Removing hollow items can be dangerous, because the water pressure against them can cause them to implode. In addition to large amounts of driftwood, about 100 animal carcasses (cattle, deer, dogs, and various small animals) become lodged against the dam or the penstock intake screens each year. Floating screens at the entrance to the forebay catch many items, as do the penstock intake screens. Workers use a crane to remove items from these screens, and bury the items retrieved at a landfill. Dam operators also use a yellow civilian version of the Alvis Stalwart amphibious vehicle to remove objects, and to maintain the dam. (This vehicle caused a stir in Great Falls in June 2006, when local residents driving on a nearby road mistook the vehicle for a sport utility vehicle which had fallen into the water.) Ice is another form of dangerous debris for the dam. In December 2010, blocks of floating ice overwhelmed the top of the dam, tearing the handrails off the maintenance walkway.

For many years, Black Eagle Dam's owners were required to hold simulations every five years to plan for various kinds of emergencies (flood, sabotage, mechanical breakdown, etc.) which might affect the dam and public safety. After the September 11 attacks, these exercises were required to happen every year. PPL Montana works with local and state government and law enforcement, other companies, and the news media to plan for various contingencies and improve how it might respond in a disaster or emergency.

=== Tax dispute and Supreme Court riverbed case ===
Taxation of the dam has been an issue of contention since 2000. During the 2002 ballot initiative fight, PPL Montana said its dams were worth at least $767 million. But in 2003, PPL argued that the dams were worth much less. PPL Montana challenged the amount of property taxes assessed on Black Eagle and its four other dams in the area, protesting 10.87 percent of the $4.48 million 2000 tax assessment, 6.5 percent of the $4.8 million 2001 tax assessment, and 85.65 percent of the $4.96 million tax assessment. This amounted to 30 percent of its total property tax assessment in the state of Montana—with one-third of amount owed payable solely in Cascade County. In February 2005, the Montana State Tax Appeal Board gave the state a partial victory, reducing the state's assessments by 10 percent but otherwise upholding the assessment method. However, the tax board did not address PPL Montana's primary claim that the state was assessing its plants differently solely because they were unregulated. PPL Montana appealed the ruling to the Montana Supreme Court in 2007. On December 4, 2007, the Montana Supreme Court unanimously ruled in State Dept. of Revenue v. PPL Montana that the tax appeal board had properly assessed PPL Montana's dams. However, PPL Montana had continued to dispute its tax assessments from 2003 to 2007, and the ruling did not directly address those challenges. But on December 14, 2007, PPL Montana offered to pay its 2003-to-2007 tax assessments at the slightly lower rate established by the tax appeal board.

Another tax issue arose in 2007. The parents of several Montana schoolchildren filed suit in the United States District Court for the District of Montana against PPL Montana. The parents argued that all riverbeds in Montana are owned by the state, are held in trust for the benefit of all the people, and that such riverbeds constitute a portion of state lands which must be taxed or leased to provide support for public schools. The plaintiffs argued that PPL Montana and its predecessor, Montana Power, only leased these riverbeds from the state and did not own them. The parents sued to force PPL to pay rent due. (At no time in the past had the state sought rental income from Montana Power, and no payments by Montana Power or PPL Montana had ever been made.) Although the federal suit was dismissed for lack of a federal issue, PPL Montana filed suit in Montana's First Judicial District Court seeking a declaratory judgment in its favor, arguing that the Federal Power Act preempts the parents' suit and denies states the power to make companies pay for the use of riverbeds. The state district court held against PPL's request for summary judgment on all counts. The two parties then went to trial, which lasted from October 22 to October 30, 2007. On June 13, 2008, the state district court ruled in favor of the state (although it denied the state's request for interest on the rent due).

PPL Montana appealed to the Montana State Supreme Court. On March 30, 2010, the Montana State Supreme Court held (5-to-2) that the state district court had not erred in its rulings on various issues of summary judgment, that riverbeds were state public trust lands (but not school trust lands) under the Montana Constitution, and that the district court's calculation of payments due was appropriate. PPL Montana, appealed to the Supreme Court of the United States, and in November 2010 the Supreme Court asked the United States Solicitor General for the views of the federal government. Finally, on February 22, 2012, the U.S. Supreme Court held in PPL Montana v. Montana (No. 10–218, dec. February 22, 2012) that the Montana Supreme Court had erred in finding all of the riverbeds beneath all PPL Montana dams navigable. The unanimous U.S. Supreme Court held that the correct test is whether the portion of the riverbed under each specific dam (not the entire river, nor even a large or small portion of a river) was navigable at the time of statehood. If it was, then the riverbed is "navigable" and may be taxed. The case was remanded back to the state supreme court for further hearings.

Flashboards on the dam were slightly damaged during flooding in the spring and early summer of 2011. Water behind the dam was lowered until it barely crested the dam so repair crews could replace the flashboards.

== Recreational aspects and fishery management ==
=== Fishing and water quality issues ===
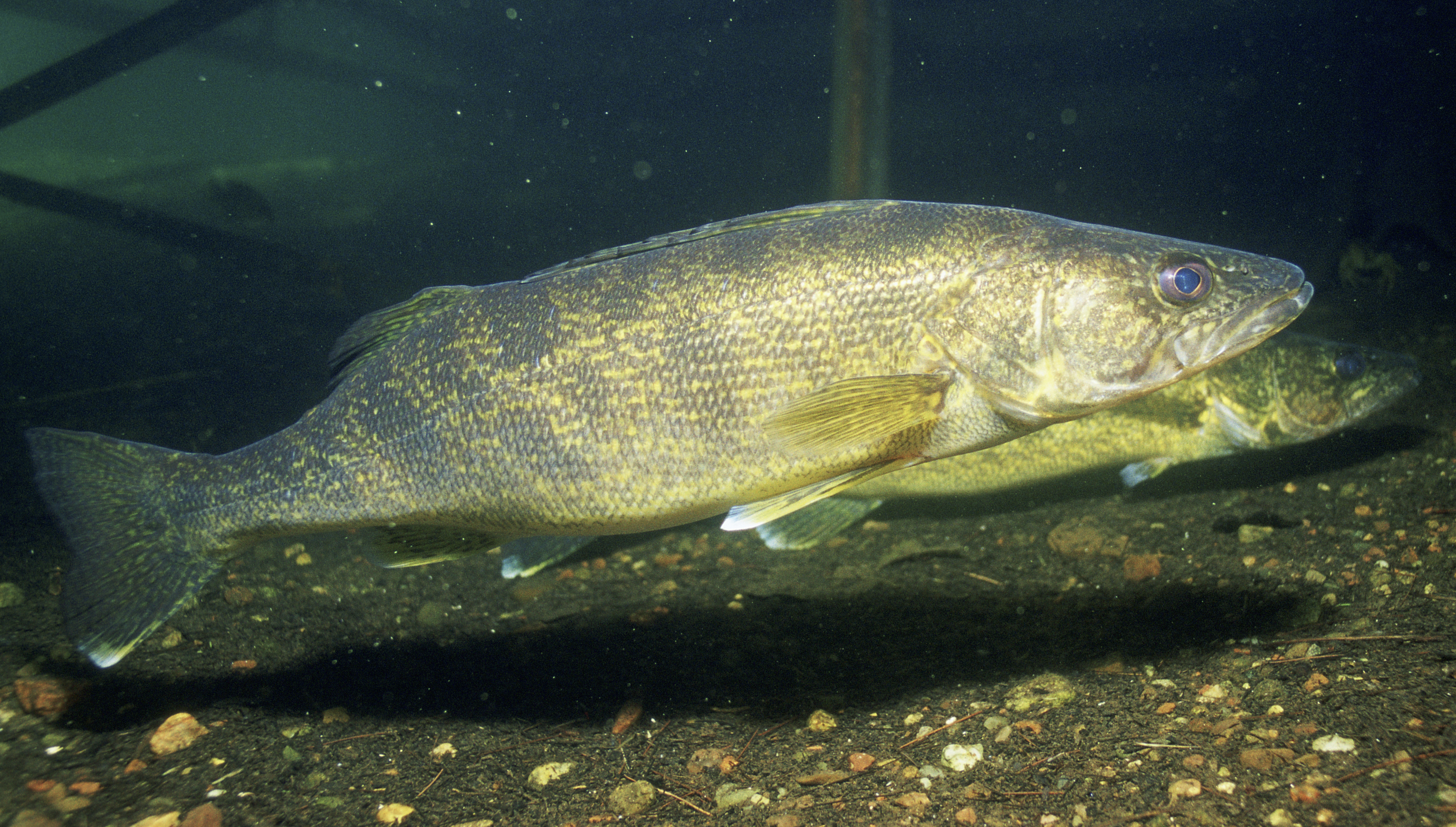
Walleye, a popular sport fish caught at Black Eagle Dam.

The river above and below Black Eagle Dam is used for fishing. Westslope cutthroat trout were first identified at Black Eagle Falls by Lewis and Clark in 1805, and the fish still are plentiful in the area. Rainbow trout are also plentiful upstream from the dam. The area below Black Eagle Falls has been rated by one guide as a good area for fly fishing smallmouth bass and walleye. For many years, the state of Montana managed the Long Pool reservoir as part of one fishing management area, and the river below the dam as part of another. This was changed in 1999, so that the two are now managed together. The change also instituted a new limit on trout caught and killed below the dam of five fish per day (only one of which could be over 18 inches (46 cm)). Limits on the number of walleye caught per day were lifted in 2010 to protect the rainbow and brown trout populations (they had been five daily and 10 in possession). According to dam officials, there are no screens to prevent fish from going over the dam or through the penstocks and turbines. Fish "go right through the turbines, it doesn't seem to bother them," dam operators say.

Since 1988, the Long Pool and the Missouri River in and around the city of Great Falls have been listed as an "impaired" waterway under the 1972 Clean Water Act. This area was first listed as impaired due to sedimentation, siltation, and suspended solids in 1988. High levels of chromium, mercury, and selenium were listed as impairing factors in 1992. High turbidity (haziness of water due to suspended particles) was added as an impairing factor in 2000. Sources of these impairments include Black Eagle Dam, upstream abandoned mines, irrigation runoff, industrial sources, and stormwater runoff. The MDEQ has given the area a quality ranking of B-2 (fourth out of 18), declaring it suitable for human consumption and recreation (after treatment) but only marginal for salmonid fish, other aquatic animals, waterfowl and fur-bearing animals. MDEQ has scheduled the Long Pool and Missouri River watershed in this area for future improvement.

In 2011, the former smelter next to Black Eagle Dam was listed by the United States Environmental Protection Agency (EPA) as a Superfund hazardous and toxic waste site. The EPA also said it would begin sampling for the riverbed above and below Black Eagle Dam, as well as residential areas in the town of Black Eagle, for heavy metals contamination. Historic records show that plant wastes were routinely dumped into the Missouri River below Black Eagle dam. MDEQ estimated in 2002 that between 27,500,000 cubic yards (21,000,000 m^{3}) and 31,000,000 cubic yards (24,000,000 m^{3}) of waste were dumped into the river between 1892 and 1915. EPA samples indicated that the contamination could extend as far downstream as Fort Benton, 34 miles (55 km) away. Toxins present in the water and riverbed, according to the EPA, include antimony, arsenic, cadmium, chromium, cobalt, copper, iron, lead, manganese, mercury, nickel, silver, sodium, and zinc.

=== Wildlife and hunting ===
The area around the falls, despite its urban setting, is a habitat for many animal and bird species. Among the birds commonly found in the area are bald eagles, California gulls, Canada geese, cliff swallows, eared grebes, egrets, golden eagles, American goldfinches, gray catbirds, house wrens, ibises, ospreys, red-necked grebes, sandhill cranes, snow geese, tundra swans, turkey vultures, western grebes, western meadowlarks, white pelicans, and numerous species of duck, owl, and warbler. Common animal species in the area include beavers, mule deer, muskrats, river otters, and white-tailed deer. Beavers are so common in the area that officials consider them pests, and trees in city parks have had to be protected against them. (At one point, beavers were chewing down two trees nightly on Black Eagle Memorial Island. These included two red oak trees found growing on the hill above the dam—the only two red oak trees in northcentral Montana). As of 2006, most of the north shore of the Missouri River below Black Eagle Dam was undeveloped as far down a Sulphur Spring (a distance of about 18 kilometres (11 mi)). Known as the Lewis and Clark Greenway, this area is under a permanent conservation easement.

Although the area below Black Eagle Dam is open for bird hunting, the reservoir and river upstream from Black Eagle Dam to Sand Coulee Creek is a no-hunting area.

Wildlife hunting is also available on the north shore of the Missouri River from below Black Eagle Dam to Morony Dam. Most of this land is owned by PPL Montana, but there is some private land here which is not open to hunting. The PPL Montana lands are open to hunting due to a conservation easement, but the Montana Department of Fish, Wildlife and Parks requires hunters to obtain a map of these lands before using them for hunting. There are also restrictions on the type of weapons which may be used in this area, and where hunters may park.

=== Recreation area improvements ===
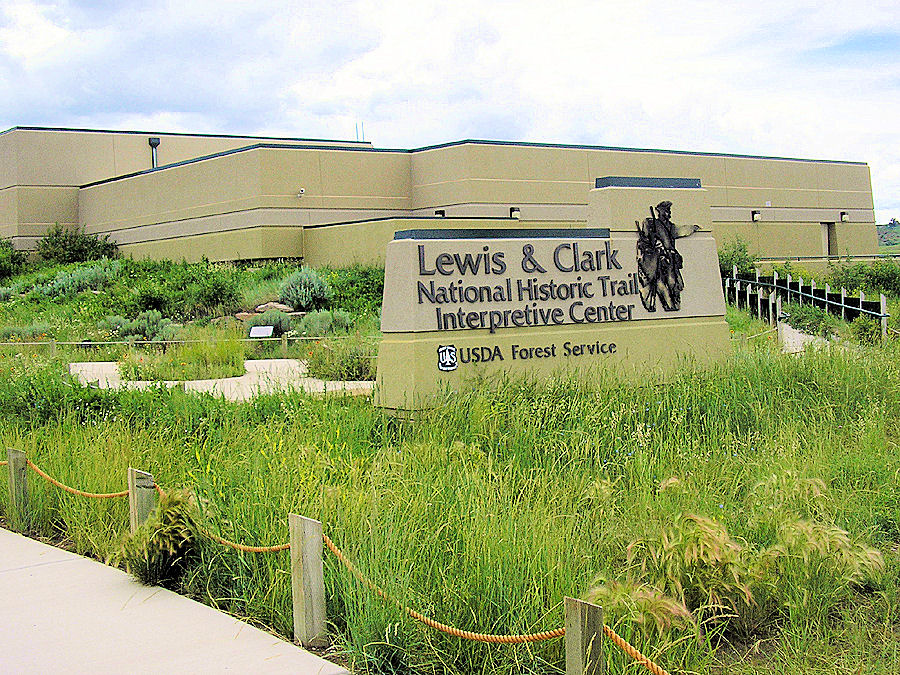
Lewis & Clark National Historic Trail Interpretative Center, located just downstream of Black Eagle Dam.

Black Eagle Dam is also utilized as a recreation area. The whitewater just below the falls is a good place for canoeing, inner-tube floating, and kayaking. Hiking and bicycling also occur in the area. Beginning in 2006, the Black Eagle Dam Run (a 5-kilometre (3.1 mi) run/walk and 10-kilometre (6.2 mi) run) has been held at Black Eagle Dam in mid-July. The annual Lewis and Clark Festival, celebrated in late June (the anniversary of the discovery of the Great Falls), focuses on events held around Black Eagle and other dams on the Great Falls of the Missouri. In mid-July, the River's Edge Trail Luminaria Walk occurs around Black Eagle Dam and the falls, and are illuminated with colored spotlights during the event. On May 5, 1998, the United States Forest Service opened the 25,000-square-foot (2,300 m^{2}) Lewis and Clark Interpretive Center, a $6 million museum and education center (which includes an exhibit hall, theater, store, and classrooms) which tells the story of Lewis and Clark's passage through central Montana and their discovery of the Great Falls of the Missouri.

Much work has been done in the past two decades to create public access to and public viewing areas of the dam and falls. For decades, two gravel spaces existed on River Drive North near the Bob Speck Municipal Golf Course where drivers could stop, get out, and view Black Eagle Falls and the dam. In 1991, the River's Edge Trail, a paved and gravel pedestrian recreational trail, opened along tracks of the former Burlington Northern Railroad on the south bank of the Missouri River at Black Eagle Dam. In 2001, Tailrace Island was renamed Black Eagle Memorial Island (in honor of those workers who lost their lives while working on or at the dam) and turned over to the River's Edge Trail. A new 10-mile-long (16 km) section of the trail linking the existing 14-mile-long (23 km) trail was also opened that year. The same year, a public boathouse was constructed on Black Eagle Memorial Island for use by canoeists, kayakers, and other watercraft; observation decks; public restrooms; and parking lot. The boat landing was completed in October 2001. Construction also began on a 0.5-mile-long (0.80 km) section of trail designed to link Art Higgins Memorial Park (on the north bank of the Missouri River just behind the dam) with the island. Most of the construction costs were paid for by PPL Montana. In 2001, another segment of the trail was added, leading from the Black Eagle Memorial Island spur up Smelter Hill. The 2,950-foot-long (900 m) trail was paid for by a Community Transportation Enhancement Project grant. There is no fee to enter Black Eagle Memorial Island, which is open daily to the public from 9 A.M. to 8 P.M. and is maintained by the Montana Department of Fish, Wildlife and Parks. In 2004, the River's Edge Trail was extended along the north bank of the Missouri River from the Black Eagle Dam powerhouse westward about 1.3 miles (2.1 km) to the 15th Street Bridge. About $175,000 of the $204,500 cost of the extension was paid for by the Community Transportation Enhancement Program, and the remainder by the Montana Air Congestion Initiative (a state program), the American Public Land Exchange (a nonprofit organization), and Recreational Trails (a nonprofit which manages the trail). Black Eagle Memorial Island opened to the public on June 2, 2005.

The development of the River's Edge Trail and the growing importance of riverside parks and attractions around Black Eagle Dam and along the banks of the Missouri River led the city of Great Falls to develop its first Missouri River Urban Corridor Plan in 2003. The master plan, which covered both banks of the Missouri River from White Bear Island to Black Eagle Dam, inventoried the entire shoreline and assessed the riverbanks for condition, rehabilitation and refurbishment, and improvement opportunities. The plan laid out a number of options above and below Black Eagle Dam for improvements to public access, recreation, and beautification.

Black Eagle Dam has changed very little between its construction in 1926 and 2010. The ruins of the powerhouses from the 1890 dam and the 1913 reconstruction were still visible as of 2005. The large cast-iron sheets which formed the south bank penstocks can also still be seen.

== Bibliography ==
- Aarstad, Rich; Arguimbau, Ellen; Baumler, Ellen; Porsild, Charlene L.; and Shovers, Brian. Montana Place Names From Alzada to Zortman. Helena, Mont.: Montana Historical Society Press, 2009.
- Annual Reports of the War Department for the Fiscal Year Ended June 30, 1903. Vol. IX, Part 1. U.S. Department of War. Washington, D.C.: Government Printing Office, 1903.
- Annual Reports of the War Department for the Fiscal Year Ended June 30, 1906. Vol. V. U.S. Department of War. Washington, D.C.: Government Printing Office, 1906.
- Axline, Jon. "Hauser Dam." METNet.MT.gov. No date. Accessed 2010-06-15.
- Beach, Chandler Belden and McMurry, Frank Morton. The New Student's Reference Work for Teachers, Students and Families. Chicago: F.E. Compton and Co., 1917.
- Behnke, Robert J. and Tomelleri, Joseph R. Trout and Salmon of North America. New York: Simon and Schuster, 2002.
- "Black Eagle Dam Open to Public." KFBB-TV. August 29, 2009. Accessed 2011-04-05.
- Botkin, Daniel B. Beyond the Stony Mountains: Nature in the American West from Lewis and Clark to Today. New York: Oxford University Press, 2004.
- Clary, Jean. Lewis & Clark on the Upper Missouri. Stevensville, Mont.: Stoneydale Press Publishing Co., 1999.
- "Company Reports." Western Machinery and Steel World. July 1912.
- Crawford, Mark. Habitats and Ecosystems: An Encyclopedia of Endangered America. Santa Barbara, Calif.: ABC-CLIO, 1999.
- Cutright, Paul Russell and Johnsgard, Paul A. Lewis and Clark: Pioneering Naturalists. 2d ed. Lincoln, Neb.: University of Nebraska Press, 2003.
- "Editorial Correspondence." Engineering and Mining Journal. December 19, 1914.
- Farshori, M. Zahoor and Hopkins, John C. "Sedimentology and Petroleum Geology of Fluvial and Shoreline Deposits of the Lower Cretaceous Sunburst Sandstone Member, Mannville Group, Southern Alberta." Bulletin of Canadian Petroleum Geology. 37:4 (December 1989).
- Federal Power Commission. Opinions and Decisions of the Federal Power Commission. Vol. 8. Washington, D.C.: U.S. Government Printing Office, 1949.
- Federal Writers' Project. Montana: A State Guide Book. Washington, D.C.: Federal Works Agency, Work Projects Administration, 1939.
- Fischer, Hank and Fischer, Carol. Paddling Montana. Guilford, Conn.: FalconGuides, 2008.
- Fisher, Cassius A. "Geology of the Great Falls Coal Field, Montana." Bulletin – United States Geological Survey. Issue 356. Washington, D.C.: U.S. Geological Survey, 1909.
- Gatchell, Willard W. "Jurisdictional Problems under the Federal Water Power Act of 1920." George Washington Law Review. 14:42 (1945–1946).
- Geological Survey. U.S. Department of the Interior. Report of Progress of Stream Measurements for the Calendar Year of 1905. Part VII. Missouri River Drainage. Water-Supply and Irrigation Paper No. 172. Series P, Hydrographic Progress Reports, 48. Washington, D.C.: Government Printing Office, 1906.
- Goodsell, Charles M. and Wallace, Henry E. The Manual of Statistics: Stock Exchange Hand-Book. New York: Manual of Statistics Co., 1913.
- "Great Falls, Mont." Street Railway Journal. April 1893.
- "Great Falls, Montana." Mines and Minerals. March 1909.
- Great Falls Public Water System. Source Water Delineation and Assessment Report. PWSID #MT0000525. November 20, 2002.
- Guthrie, C. W. All Aboard! for Glacier: The Great Northern Railway and Glacier National Park. Helena, Mont.: Farcountry Press, 2004.
- Hall, J. H. Montana. Helena, Mont.: Independent Publishing Co., 1912.
- Haney, M. and Schwartz, R.K. Estuarine Member of the Lower Cretaceous Kootenai Formation, Missouri River Gorge, Great Falls, MT. Paper No. 38-15. Northeastern Section, 38th Annual Meeting. Geological Society of America. March 27–29, 2003.
- Hebgen, Max. "The System of the Montana Power Company." Electrical World. June 12, 1915.
- Hofman, H. O. "Notes on the Metallurgy of Copper of Montana." Transactions of the American Institute of Mining Engineers. New York: American Institute of Mining Engineers, 1904.
- Holmes, Krys; Dailey, Susan C.; and Walter, David. Montana: Stories of the Land. Helena, Mont.: Montana Historical Society Press, 2008.
- Howard, Ela Mae. Lewis & Clark—Exploration of Central Montana. Rev. ed. Guilford, Conn.: Globe Pequot, 2000.
- Hyde, Charles K. Copper for America: The United States Copper Industry From Colonial Times to the 1990s. Tucson: University of Arizona Press, 1998.
- Jackson, Donald C. Dams. Brookfield, Vt.: Ashgate, 1997.
- Johnson, Lon (November 1994). "Holter Hydroelectric Facility, House No. 8" (PDF). Historic American Engineering Record. Washington, D.C.: Library of Congress.
- Lass, William E. Navigating the Missouri: Steamboating on Nature's Highway, 1819-1935. Norman, Okla.: Arthur H. Clark Co., 2008.
- Lawrence, Tom. Pictures, a Park, and a Pulitzer: Mel Ruder and the 'Hungry Horse News'. Helena, Mont.: Farcountry Press/Montana Magazine, 2000.
- Lewis, Meriwether and Clark, William. The Journals of Lewis and Clark. Whitefish, Mont.: Kessinger Publishing, 2004.
- Malone, Michael P. The Battle for Butte: Mining and Politics on the Northern Frontier, 1864-1906. Seattle: University of Washington Press, 2006.
- Malone, Michael P. James J. Hill: Empire Builder of the Northwest. Norman, Okla.: University of Oklahoma Press, 1996.
- Marcosson, Isaac F. Anaconda. New York: Anaconda Company, 1957.
- Martin, Albro. James J. Hill and the Opening of the Northwest. St. Paul: Minnesota Historical Society Press, 1991.
- McCormick, Mary (September 1996). "Black Eagle Hydroelectric Facility" (PDF). Historic American Engineering Record. Washington, D.C.: Library of Congress.
- The Montana Almanac. Missoula, Mont.: Montana State University, 1958.
- Montana Department of Environmental Quality. Montana 2010 Final Water Quality Integrated Report. WQPBDMSRPT-03-F. Helena, Mont.: Montana Dept. of Environmental Quality, December 14, 2010.
- Morris, Patrick F. Anaconda, Montana: Copper Smelting Boom Town on the Western Frontier. Bethesda, Md.: Swann Publishing, 1997.
- Mutschler, Charles V. Wired for Success: The Butte, Anaconda & Pacific Railway, 1892-1985. Pullman, Wash.: Washington State University Press, 2002.
- National Climatic Center. Climatological Data National Summary. Asheville, N.C.: National Oceanic and Atmospheric Administration, Environmental Data Service, National Climatic Center, January 1976.
- Nichols, Ellsworth. Public Utilities Reports. Rochester, N.Y.: Lawyers Cooperative Publishing Co., 1949.
- Office of Water. Section 319 Nonpoint Source Program Success Story: Montana: Successful Collaboration and Agricultural BMPs Improved 80 Miles of Sun River. EPA 841-F-07-001Y. U.S. Environmental Protection Agency. October 2007.
- Parker, Maurice S. "Black Eagle Falls Dam, Great Falls, Montana." Transactions of the American Society of Civil Engineers. July 1892.
- Parry, Ellis Roberts. Montana Dateline. Guilford, Conn.: Twodot Press, 2001.
- Peterson, Don. Great Falls. Charleston, S.C.: Arcadia Publishing, 2010.
- Plum, Lester V. "The Definition of Navigable Waters and the 'Doctrine of Minor Interest'." Journal of Land and Public Utility Economics. 13:4 (November 1937).
- PPL Montana, LLC. Form S-4. Registration Statement Under the Securities Act of 1933. EIN 54–1928759. November 21, 2000.
- Raymer, Robert George. A History of Copper Mining in Montana. Chicago: Lewis Publishing Co., 1930.
- Report of the Bureau of Agriculture Labor and Industry of the State of Montana. Bureau of Agriculture, Labor, and Industry. State of Montana. Helena, Mont.: Independent Publishing Co., 1908.
- Report of the Chief of Engineers, United States Army, to the Secretary of War for the Year 1883. Part II. Corps of Engineers, United States Army. Washington, D.C.: Government Printing Office, 1883.
- Report of the Chief of Engineers, United States Army, to the Secretary of War for the Year 1892. Part I. Corps of Engineers, United States Army. Washington, D.C.: Government Printing Office, 1892.
- Report of the Chief of Engineers, United States Army, to the Secretary of War for the Year 1892. Part II. Corps of Engineers, United States Army. Washington, D.C.: Government Printing Office, 1892.
- Ripley, Theron M. "The Canyon Ferry Dam." Journal of the Association of Engineering Societies. May 1898.
- River's Edge Trail Foundation. The River's Edge History Tour. No date.
- Roberts, Thomas P. "The Upper Missouri River." Contributions to the Historical Society of Montana. Helena, Mont.: Rocky Mountain Publishing, 1876.
- Robbins, Chuck. Flyfisher's Guide to Montana. Belgrade, Mont.: Wilderness Adventures Press, 2005.
- Robbins, Chuck. Great Places: Montana: A Recreational Guide to Montana's Public Lands and Historic Places for Birding, Hiking, Photography, Fishing, Hunting, and Camping. Belgrade, Mont.: Wilderness Adventures Press, 2008.
- Searl, Molly. Montana Disasters: Fires, Floods, and Other Catastrophes. Boulder, Colo.: Pruett Publishing, 2001.
- Smith, Barrett. "The Hauser Lake and Wolf Creek Projects." Stone & Webster Public Service Journal. October 1908.
- Smith, Lincoln. The Power Policy of Maine. Berkeley, Calif.: University of California Press, 1951.
- Strahorn, Robert E. The Resources of Montana Territory and Attractions of Yellowstone National Park. Helena, Mont.: Montana Legislature, 1879.
- Sweetser, M. F. and King, Moses. King's Handbook of the United States. Buffalo, N.Y.: Moses King Corp., 1891.
- Taliaferro, John. Charles M. Russell: The Life and Legend of America's Cowboy Artist. Norman, Okla.: University of Oklahoma Press, 2003.
- Terzaghi, Karl; Peck, Ralph B.; Mesri, Gholamreza. Soil Mechanics in Engineering Practice. New York: Wiley, 1996.
- Tirrell, Norma and Reddy, John. Montana. Oakland, Calif.: Compass American Guides, 1991.
- Vaughn, Robert. Then and Now, or, Thirty-Six Years in the Rockies: Personal Reminiscences of Some of the First Pioneers of the State of Montana, Indians and Indian Wars, and the Past and Present of the Rocky Mountain Country: 1864-1900. Chicago: Tribune Printing Company, 1900.
- War Department Annual Reports. Vol. II. U.S. Department of War. Washington, D.C.: Government Printing Office, 1910.
- Water Right Solutions, Inc. Analysis of Claims for Objection Purposes. Missouri River from Sun to Marias River, Basin 41Q. Prepared for the City of Great Falls, Montana. February 28, 2011.
- Wegmann, Edward. The Design and Construction of Dams. New York: John Wiley & Sons, 1918.
