= Thomas Paschall Roberts =

Civil engineer and surveyor

- Born: Thomas Paschall Roberts; April 21, 1843; Carlisle, Pennsylvania, United States
- Died: February 25, 1924 (aged 80); Pittsburgh, Pennsylvania
- Other names: Colonel, Colonel Roberts
- Education: Dickinson College, Pennsylvania State College
- Occupations: Surveyor and civil engineer
- Known for: Chief engineer of Monongahela Navigation Company, surveyor of Ohio River, namer of Black Eagle and Rainbow Falls

Thomas Paschall Roberts (April 21, 1843 – February 25, 1924) was a civil engineer and surveyor who worked as the chief engineer of the Monongahela Navigation Company and named Black Eagle Falls and Rainbow Falls during his survey of the Missouri River.

== Early life ==
Thomas Paschall Roberts, known affectionately as Colonel, was born on April 21, 1843, in Carlisle, Pennsylvania to William Milnor Roberts and Anna Gibson Roberts. In 1854, he and his family moved to Pittsburgh, Pennsylvania, then back to Carlisle. He was educated at private and public schools in these two cities, including Farmers’ High School, before attending Dickinson College and Pennsylvania State College. While attending Dickinson College, Thomas was elected President of the Union Philosophical Society. In 1863, he left Pennsylvania State College to join his father in the construction of the Don Pedro Railroad in Brazil.

== Civil engineering career ==
Roberts worked as a civil engineer on the Don Pedro Railroad with his father until 1865. He returned to the United States and was named principal assistant engineer under his father for work on improving the Ohio River.

In 1870, Roberts and his father became railroad engineers for the Montana division of the Northern Pacific Railroad. From 1876 to 1878, Roberts worked as the chief engineer for the Pittsburgh Southern Railroad. In 1881, following some of his surveying work, Roberts became the chief engineer of the Baltimore and Cumberland Valley Railroad.

In 1884, Roberts became the chief engineer of the Monongahela Navigation Company, a position that he held until the United States government purchased the company’s plant in 1897. He then became the United States assistant engineer and retained “local charge of the Monongahela River improvements.”

== Surveying career ==
When Roberts returned to the United States after his work in Brazil, he began work on surveying land for a planned railroad in Pennsylvania that was meant to be financed by English capitalists.

In 1870, following his work in improving the Ohio River, Roberts surveyed the river from Sioux City, Iowa, to the three forks of the Missouri River. Between 1870 and 1884, Roberts engaged in railway and waterway surveying projects for “the Cincinnati & Northern Railroad to Michigan, the West Wisconsin Railroad, the Western Maryland Railroad into Pennsylvania, the Pittsburgh & Atlantic Railroad, the Louisville & Nashville system in Kentucky, and work on a narrow-gauge railroad running from Pittsburgh to Washington, P.A."

In 1872, Roberts and a group of men were sponsored by the United States government to conduct a survey of the Missouri River. The goal of the expedition was to “survey the river’s potential for commercial use with light-draft steamboats, and to map a possible route around the Great Falls for a proposed narrow-gauge railroad.” On this expedition, Roberts named several significant falls, including Black Eagle Falls and Rainbow Falls. His survey extended from Fort Benton to Three Forks and was published by the U.S. War Department in 1874.

Roberts also surveyed the upper Monongahela River from Morgantown to Fairmont, West Virginia, in 1875 and the Allegheny River from Freeport, Pennsylvania, to Olean, New York, in 1878–1879.

In 1889, Roberts became interested in the construction of a canal between Lake Erie and the Ohio River near Pittsburgh. Governor Beaver appointed Roberts chief engineer of the Ship Canal Commission of Pennsylvania to carry out surveys on the land and determine whether or not a canal could or should be constructed. Following this survey, the Pittsburgh Chamber of Commerce created an engineering committee to make a complete survey and prepare a report on the canal’s feasibility. Roberts made chairman of this committee and presented the report following the completion of his work.

== Personal life ==
In 1866, Roberts moved back to Pittsburgh to make it his permanent home. Roberts married Juliet Emma Christy, daughter of attorney-at-law James M. Christy, on June 8, 1870. The couple had seven children: Eleanor Christy, Annie Gibson, Juliette Paschall, Laura Milnor, Thomas P. Junior, J. Milor, and Mary Brunot. One child, Milnore, died in childhood.

== Clubs and societies ==
Roberts was a member of the American Association for the Advancement of Science and the Academy of Science of Western Pennsylvania. He was also a member of the Monday Club, a group that organized to discuss scientific matters, as well as Theta Delta Chi and other social and fraternal organizations.

== Involvement in Pittsburgh community ==
Roberts was one of the organizers of the Engineers’ Society of Western Pennsylvania in 1880 and served as its president in 1891. In addition, he assisted in organizing the Botanical Society of Western Pennsylvania and the Pittsburgh Academy of Science and Arts. Thomas was also a life manager of the Pittsburgh Exposition Society and a director, vice president and member of the Pittsburgh Chamber of Commerce.

== Later years ==
In 1912, Roberts partially retired and took up a position as an engineering consultant for the U.S. Engineer Office in Pittsburgh, where he worked until his full retirement on August 20, 1922 under the Federal Retirement Act. Thomas died on February 25, 1924 in Pittsburgh, Pennsylvania from chronic myocarditis.

== Publications ==
- Roberts, Thomas P., Jeremiah S. Black, and William Augustus Porter. Memoirs of John Bannister Gibson : Late Chief Justice of Pennsylvania, 1890.
- Roberts, Thomas P., and United States. Army. Corps of Engineers. Report of a Reconnaissance of the Missouri River in 1872. Washington: Government Printing Office, 1875.
- Roberts, Thomas Paschall. 1913. "Pros and cons on the forest and flood question". Professional Memoirs, Corps of Engineers, U.S. Army, and Engineer Department-at-Large. 5: 568-585.
- Roberts, Thomas P. 1893. Address on the commercial outlets of the Great Lakes, with special reference to the proposed Lake Erie and Ohio River Ship Canal: delivered before the Chamber of Commerce of Pittsburgh, March 27, 1893. [Pittsburgh?, Pa.]: [publisher not identified].
- Roberts, Thomas P. 1875. Report of reconnaissance of Missouri River in 1872. Washington, DC: U.S. G.P.O.
- Roberts, Thomas Paschall. 1893. The World's Columbian Water Commerce Congress, Chicago, 1893: The projected Lake Erie and Ohio River : ship canal. Boston: Damrell & Upham.
