= Rainbow Falls (Missouri River) =

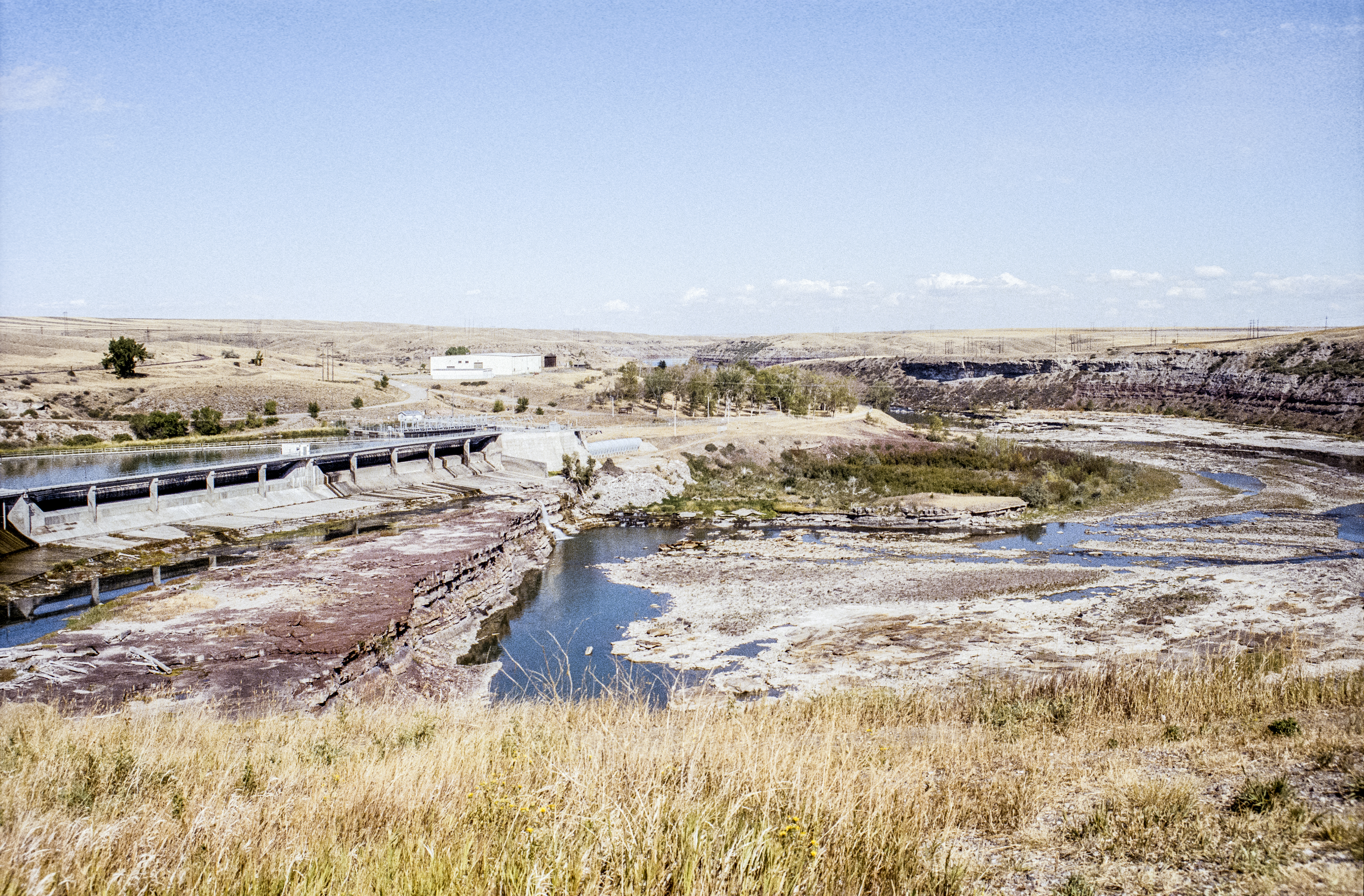
- Rainbow Falls and Rainbow Dam in 2000
- Interactive map of Rainbow Falls
- Location: Cascade County, Montana, United States
- Coordinates: 47°32′00″N 111°12′20″W
- Type: Block
- Total height: 47 ft (14 m)
- Number of drops: 1
- Total width: 1,320 ft (400 m)

Rainbow Falls (originally "Handsome Falls") is a waterfall on the Missouri River in Great Falls, Montana, just upstream from Crooked Falls and downstream from Colter Falls and Rainbow Dam. It is 47 feet (14m) high and 1,320 feet (402.3m) wide. The waterfall is part of the five Great Falls of the Missouri. The river spills over a sheer ledge of sandstone in the Kootenai Formation, forming the falls. The falls used to flow with a great deal of force year-round. In 1914 the river shortly upstream was dammed for hydroelectric power by the Rainbow Dam, which forms a run-of-the-river reservoir. As a result, the falls can almost totally dry up in the summer with only a few narrow strips of water trickling down its face. A railroad bridge crosses the river directly above the falls.

== Description ==
Rainbow Falls varies widely - whether it is in full flow in the spring, or greatly diminished by the autumn. In peak flow in the springtime, the falls is much like its original form - especially on the right side where the outlet works of the dam are located, and on the left side where the main spillway structure is positioned. The center section of the dam, which is also a spillway structure, only functions when the flow above the reservoir is too great. The left side of the falls is more heavily eroded than the right side, and sits a little farther upstream. Expansive and arid hills rise above the canyon on each bank. Below the falls is a long, narrow plunge pool, and a series of gravel bars.

As the flow over the falls diminishes, usually from summer to early autumn, it splits into two parts, hugging both banks. The flow at this point usually still extends across most (70 percent) of the full width of the river, but a section in the center remains dry except for a narrow stream of water that is found when the flow is low enough to separate it from the left-side drop, but high enough to feed it. The river below the falls remains mostly full. Much of the water is still diverted to generate power, but there is still enough water flow in the river to flow over the dam's spillways.

In the autumn, however, the majority of the river is diverted through penstocks around the right side of the falls. The penstocks continue downstream past 19-ft (5m) Crooked Falls, utilizing the combined drop of over 70 ft (21m) to generate hydroelectricity through 8 turbines. The falls themselves are reduced to a mere trickle. Some water still continues down the right side of the falls through a few parallel drops, trickling out of the river outlet works. On the right, there are also two drops, each around 10 ft (3m) wide at low flow. Also, water comes out of a pipe at the left bank side of the falls, and trickles into the river in a series of small waterfalls.

Upstream of Rainbow Falls lies Colter Falls and Black Eagle Falls; the former is buried under the reservoir formed by Rainbow Dam, while the latter is controlled by a dam in a similar way to Rainbow Falls. Downstream are Crooked Falls and the Grand Falls of the Missouri. Crooked Falls, as mentioned, is mostly in its natural state, except for an infill on its right side where the penstocks were constructed. Grand Falls is in a similar situation to Rainbow and Black Eagle falls. However, while Black Eagle and Grand Falls were half obliterated by the construction of power canals, Rainbow Falls remains virtually unaltered.

== History ==
Rainbow Falls was first discovered by the Lewis and Clark Expedition. Rainbow Falls and downstream Crooked Falls are the only two waterfalls on the Missouri-Mississippi river system to remain in an almost-natural condition. Black Eagle Falls and Great Falls are half-occupied by their dams' powerhouses, and Colter Falls is submerged. The waterfall received its name from the frequent presence of rainbows in its spray before the dams were built.

Meriwether Lewis was known to comment on the falls:

... hearing a tremendious roaring above me I continued ... a few hundred yards further and was again presented by one of the most bea[utiful]objects in nature, a cascade of about fifty feet perpendicular stre[t]ching at [right angles] across the river from side to side to the distance of at least a quarter of a mile. here the river pitches over a shelving rock, with an edge as regular and streight as if formed by art, without a nich[e] or br[eak] in it; the water descends in one even and uninterrupted sheet . . .

The waterfall was named "Beautiful Cascade" and later "Handsom[e] Falls" by Lewis, but was given its present name by Thomas Paschall Roberts, a railroad engineer, in 1872.

== See also ==
- List of waterfalls
