= Colter Falls =

- Interactive map of Colter Falls
- Location: Montana, U.S.
- Coordinates: 47°32′15″N 111°12′53″W
- Total height: 14 feet (4.3 m)
- Total width: 0.5 miles (0.80 km)
- Watercourse: Missouri River
- Average flow rate: 156,000,000 US gallons (590,000,000 L; 130,000,000 imp gal) per day

Colter Falls, also called Coulter Falls, is a submerged waterfall on the Missouri River in north-central Montana, and part of the Great Falls of the Missouri. Downstream of Colter Falls lies Rainbow Falls, and upstream is Black Eagle Falls. The falls is now flooded in the impoundment behind Rainbow Dam. As Rainbow Dam's reservoir is a run-of-the-river reservoir, it rarely is emptied, so the falls are rarely seen even in extreme drought.

== Discovery ==
The Lewis and Clark Expedition visited the falls, first describing the Westslope cutthroat trout at their base, but did not name them. They were named by Paris Gibson, founder of the city of Great Falls, Montana.

== See also ==
- List of waterfalls
