= Ryan Dam =

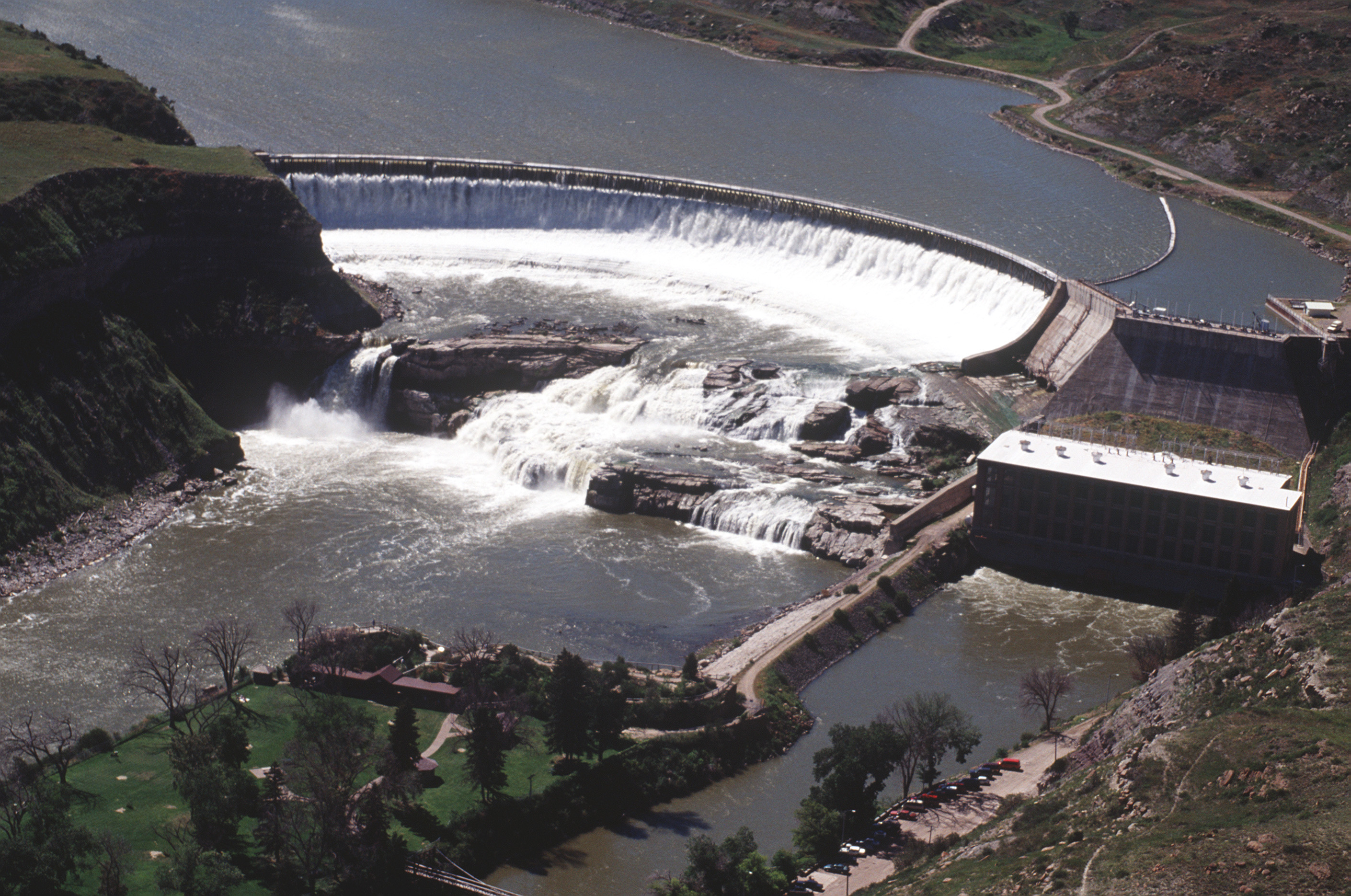
- Location: Cascade County, Montana, USA
- Coordinates: 47°34′10″N 111°07′29″W
- Construction began: 1915
- Owner(s): NorthWestern Corporation

Dam and spillways
- Impounds: Missouri River
- Height: 61 ft
- Length: 1,336 ft

Reservoir
- Total capacity: 5,000 acre-feet (6,200,000 m^{3})

Power Station
- Installed capacity: 60 megawatts (80,000 hp)
- Annual generation: 441,430,000 kWh (2009)

Ryan Dam is a hydroelectric dam on the Missouri River, 10 miles (16 km) downstream from the city of Great Falls in the U.S. state of Montana. The dam is 1,336 feet (407 m) long and 61 feet (19 m) high; its reservoir is 7 miles (11 km) long and has a storage capacity of 5,000 acre-feet (6,200,000 m^{3}). It is a run-of-river dam. The dam is built on the largest of the five Great Falls of the Missouri, the "Big Falls", also sometimes called "Great Falls". Since 1915, the six-unit powerhouse on the left side of the dam has occupied a significant portion of the 87-foot (27 m) high waterfall.

The dam, built in 1915 just upstream of the falls and a small island named Ryan Island, is divided into two parts. On the right side of the dam is a concrete-arch spillway structure, that when functioning, releases water over the remains of the waterfall. The center part of the dam consists of a dike that extends from the falls' base to Ryan Island (separating the tailrace from the main river, which it meets a few hundred yards downstream). It also contains a concrete gravity structure facing towards the right bank of the river and tilted to face slightly downstream. This segment of the dam contains the outlet works, a water jet that bursts out and cascades over the waterfall. The left side of the dam is a large powerhouse topped by a concrete gravity structure.

Montana Power Company originally built the dam, PPL Corporation purchased it in 1997 and sold it to NorthWestern Corporation in 2014. Since the dam's construction in the Missouri River gorge, it has flooded a fair portion of the Great Falls - the cascades between Grand Fall and Crooked Falls, which lies several miles upstream - and reduced the flow over Great Falls to such an extent that much of the bedrock is visible. The dam was constructed on top of a 10-foot (3.0 m) cascade that Lewis and Clark observed to lie just upstream of Grand Fall. The next dam upstream is Cochrane Dam, then Rainbow Dam, and Black Eagle Dam. The next dam downstream is Morony Dam.
