= Rainbow Dam =

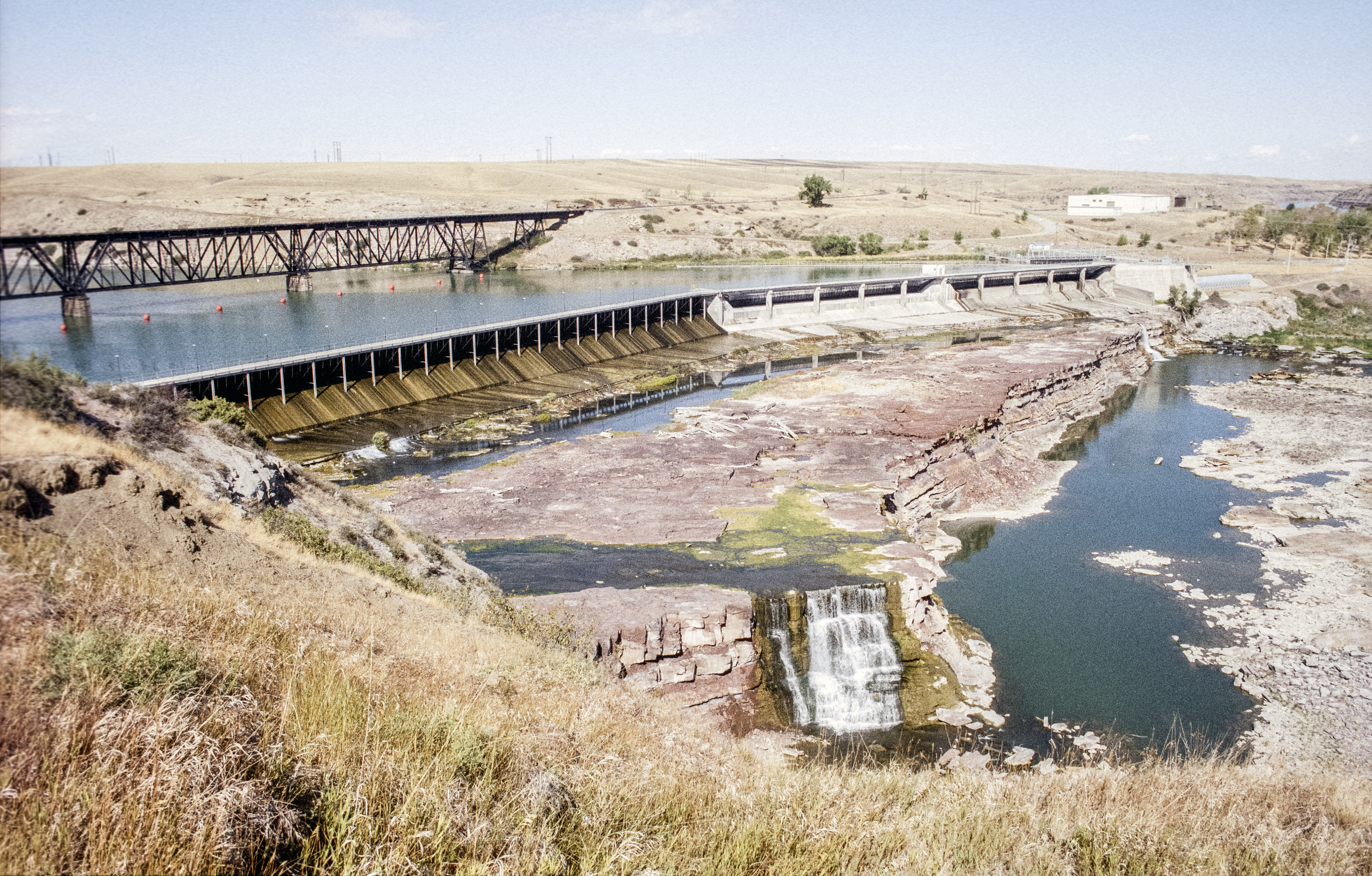
- Rainbow Dam and Rainbow Falls in 2000
- Official name: Rainbow Dam
- Location: Cascade County, Montana, US
- Coordinates: 47°32′04″N 111°12′18″W
- Opening date: 1910
- Operator(s): NorthWestern Corporation

Dam and spillways
- Impounds: Missouri River
- Height: 29 ft (8.8 m)
- Length: 1,055 ft (321.6 m)

Power Station
- Installed capacity: 36 MW
- Annual generation: 268,070,000 KWh (2009)

Rainbow Dam is a hydroelectric dam on the Missouri River, 29 feet (8.8 m) high and 1,055 feet (322 m) long, located six miles northeast of Great Falls in the U.S. state of Montana.

== History ==
The dam is named for the downstream Rainbow Falls, a 45 ft (14 m) waterfall that is the third of the five Great Falls of the Missouri. Built in 1910, the dam furnishes water to an eight-unit hydroelectric plant with a capacity of 36 megawatts. As the dam's power plant is located over a half-mile downstream, the flow of water over Rainbow Falls and downstream Crooked Falls is significantly reduced during the dry season. The water from the penstocks re-enters the river a few hundred yards east of Crooked Falls. Montana Power Company acquired the dam when it was founded in 1912, PPL Corporation purchased it in 1997 and sold it to NorthWestern Corporation in 2014.

== See also ==
- Ryan Dam
