= Morony Dam =

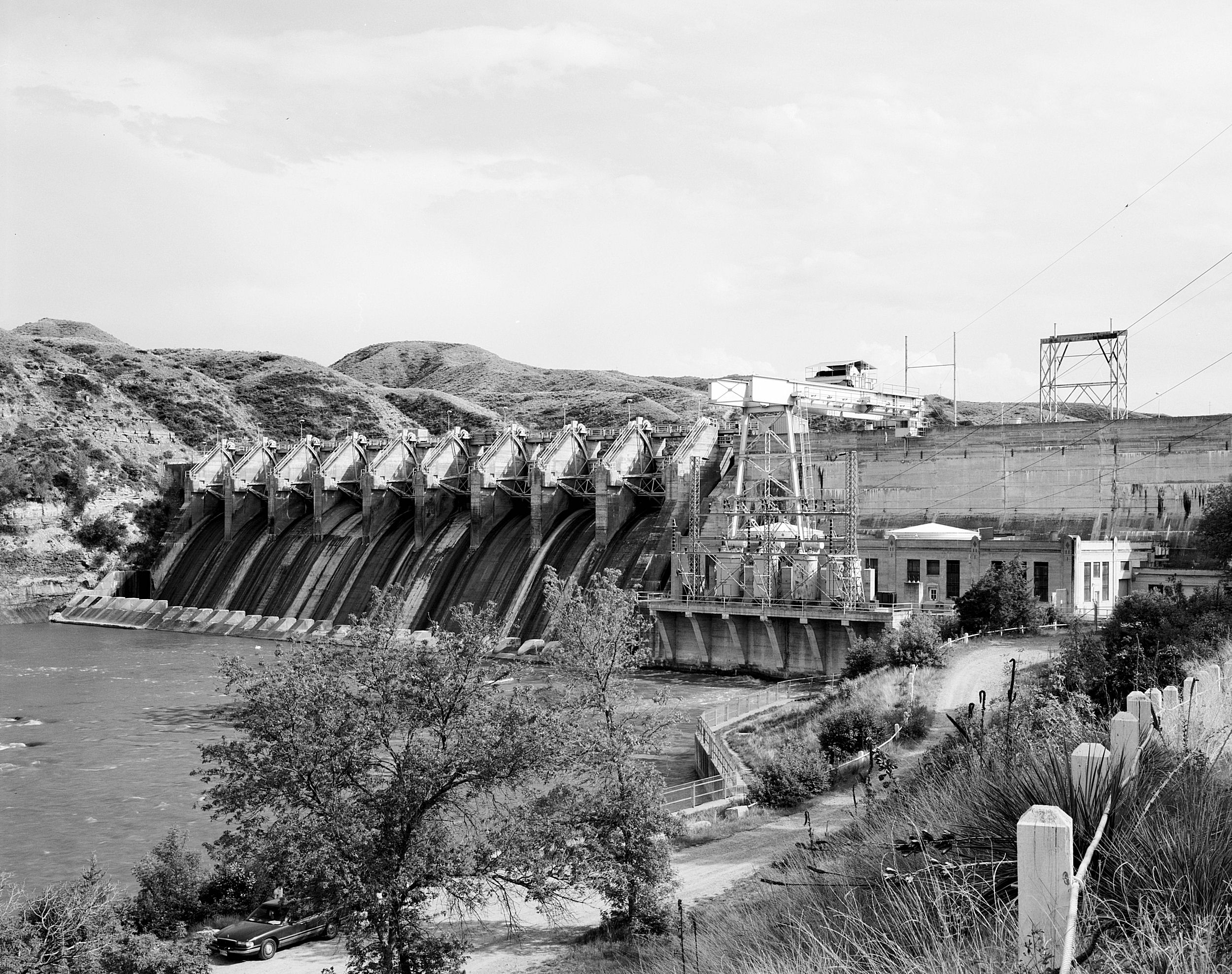
- Looking southeast at Morony Dam in 2007
- Interactive map of Morony Dam
- Official name: Morony Dam
- Location: Cascade County, Montana, U.S.
- Coordinates: 47°34′54″N 111°03′26″W
- Construction began: 1928
- Opening date: 1930
- Operator: NorthWestern Corporation

Dam and spillways
- Impounds: Missouri River
- Height: 94 feet (29 m)
- Length: 883 feet (269 m)

Power Station
- Installed capacity: 49 MW
- Annual generation: 307,170,000 KWh (2009)

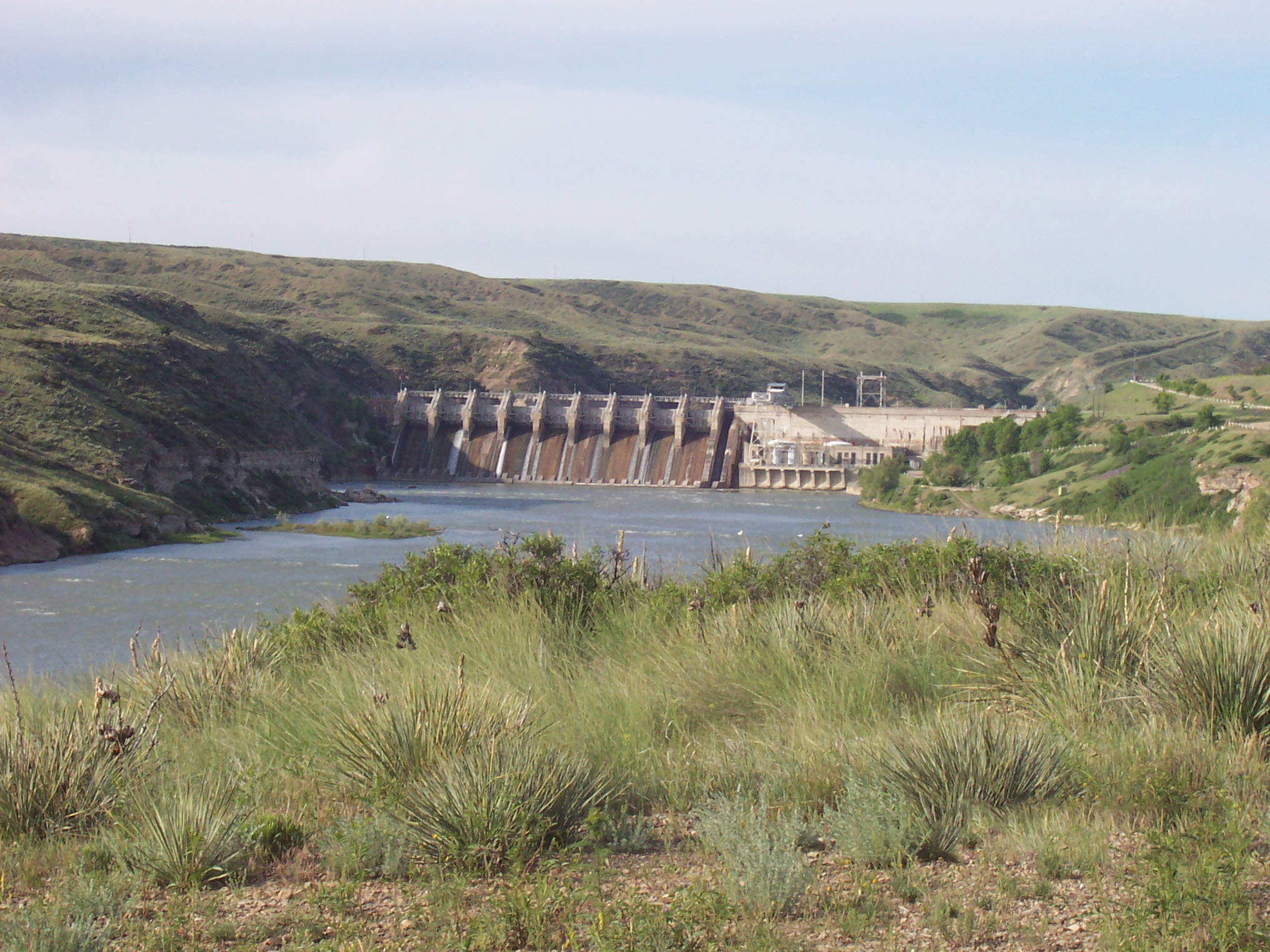
Morony Dam from the Sulphur Springs Trail

Morony Dam is a hydroelectric gravity dam located on the Missouri River in Cascade County, Montana. The dam is 883 feet (269 m) long and 94 feet (29 m) high, and generates 49 megawatts (MW) of power.

== Overview ==
The dam is named after John G. Morony, a banker, director of the Amalgamated Copper Company (the name of the Anaconda Copper Company between 1899 and 1915), and director of the Montana Power Company. (Morony was largely responsible for constructing Ryan Dam.) Morony Dam was built by the Phoenix Utility Company. Montana Power commissioned the dam in order to provide additional power to the Anaconda Copper's zinc refinery at nearby Great Falls, Montana. Construction began in 1928, and the dam was completed in 1930.

Morony Dam has a 390-foot (120 m) wide spillway. Nine tainter gates and one sluice gate control the flow over water down the spillway. The headrace (or water inlet) for the powerhouse and the powerhouse itself are on the north side of the dam. The powerhouse, a portio of which is open to the elements, has two vertical Francis turbines. The dam originally generated 48 megawatts of power.

PPL Corporation purchased the dam in 1997 and sold it to NorthWestern Corporation in 2014.

== Big Eddy ==
Just below Morony Dam is a well-known hydrologic feature of the Missouri River known as the "Big Eddy." Belt Creek enters the Missouri River about 1 mile (1.6 km) below Morony Dam, past the rapids created by the dam. The large stream creates significant undertow and turbulence, which is not easily seen by boaters approaching from either side of the confluence of the two waterways. The Lewis and Clark Expedition camped on the west bank of the Missouri River just below the Big Eddy on June 15, 1805, after the hydrologic feature held them back temporarily. The area is primarily reached by water, but the head of the Big Eddy Land Trail is nearby.

The Big Eddy is well known by local boaters. Between 1970 and 2010, several people drowned there after being caught unawares by the feature. In 2010, a man and his son were jetboating in the area and barely avoided drowning after the Big Eddy sucked their machine underwater.

== Bibliography ==
- Aarstad, Rich; Arguimbau, Ellen; Baumler, Ellen; Porsild, Charlene L.; and Shovers, Brian. Montana Place Names From Alzada to Zortman. Helena, Mont.: Montana Historical Society Press, 2009.
- Emmerling, Clifford L. "Montana Power Company's Dam Repair Program." Journal of the Construction Division, ASCE. Vol. 98, No. C02, Proc. Paper 9208. September 1972: 295-311.
- Peterson, Don. Great Falls. Charleston, S.C.: Arcadia Publishing, 2010.
- PPL Montana, LLC. Form S-4. Registration Statement Under the Securities Act of 1933. EIN 54-1928759. November 21, 2000.
