= Great Falls (Missouri River) =

Series of waterfalls in Montana, United States

Great Falls of the Missouri River
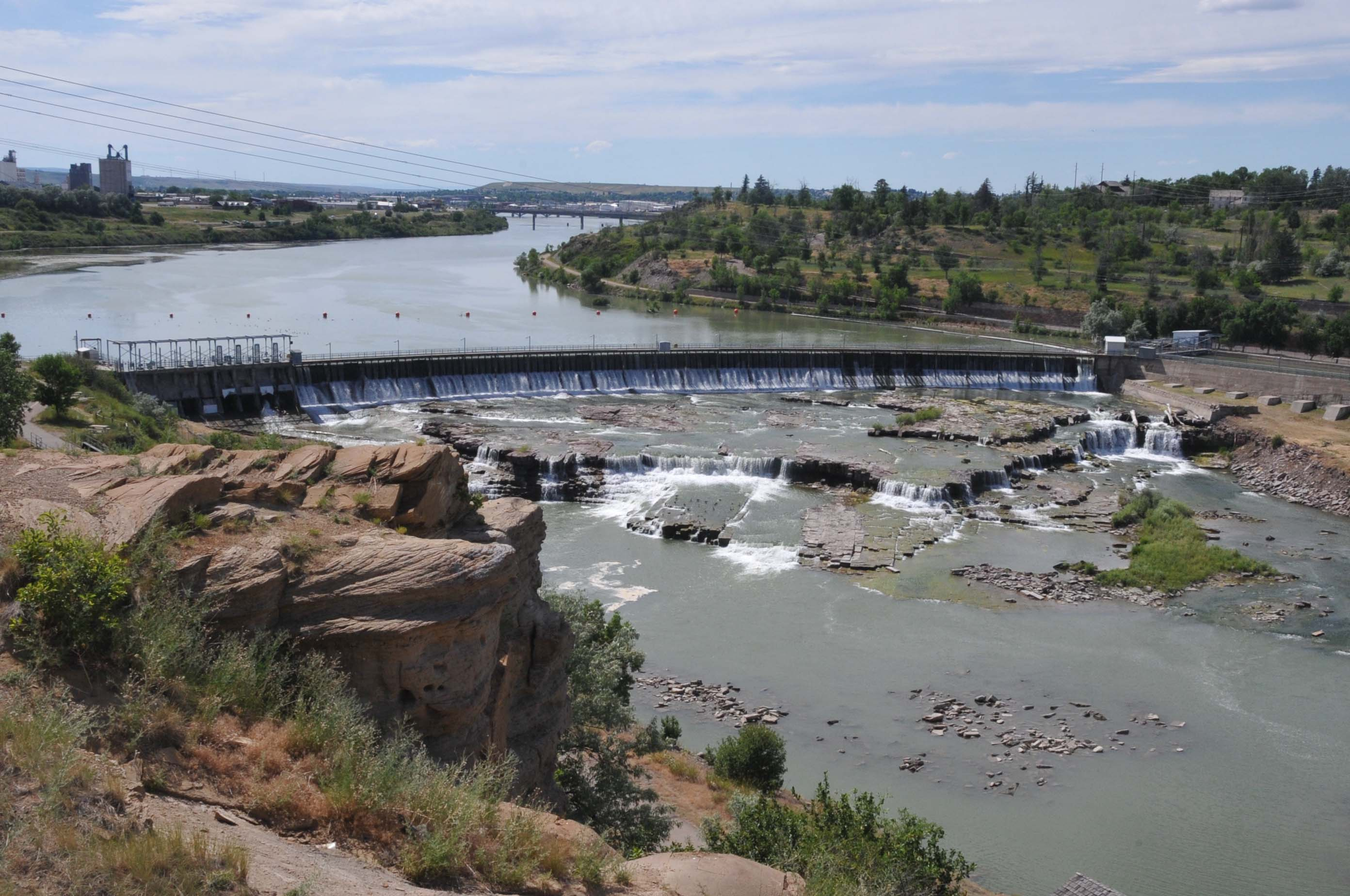
- Black Eagle Falls and Dam in 2014

- Location within the United States Location within Montana
- Location: Cascade County, Montana, U.S.
- Coordinates: 47°34′12″N 111°07′23″W
- Total height: 187 feet (57 m)
- Number of drops: 5
- Longest drop: 87 feet (27 m)
- Watercourse: Missouri River
- Average flow rate: 7,539 cu ft/s (213.5 m^{3}/s)

The Great Falls of the Missouri River are a series of waterfalls on the upper Missouri River in north-central Montana in the United States. From upstream to downstream, the five falls along a 10-mile (16 km) segment of the river are:

- Black Eagle Falls (26 feet 5 inches or 8.05 meters)
- Colter Falls (6 feet 7 inches or 2.01 meters)
- Rainbow Falls (44 feet 6 inches or 13.56 meters)
- Crooked Falls, also known as Horseshoe Falls (19 feet or 5.79 m)
- Big Falls, also known as the Great Falls, (87 feet or 26.52 m)

The Missouri River drops a total of 612 feet (187 m) from the first of the falls to the last, which includes a combined 187 feet (57 m) of vertical plunges and 425 feet (130 m) of riverbed descent. The Great Falls have been described as "spectacular", one of the "scenic wonders of America", and "a major geographic discovery". When the Lewis and Clark Expedition became the first white men to see the falls in 1805, Meriwether Lewis said they were the grandest sight he had beheld thus far in the journey.

The Great Falls of the Missouri River were depicted on the territorial seal of the Montana Territory, and later on the state seal of Montana in 1893.

== Names of the falls ==
The Mandan Indians knew of cataracts and called them by a descriptive (but not formal) name: Minni-Soze-Tanka-Kun-Ya, or "the great falls." The South Piegan Blackfeet, however, had a formal name for Rainbow Falls and called it "Napa's Snarling." No record exists of a Native American name for any of the other four waterfalls.

Four of the five waterfalls were given names in 1805 by American explorers Meriwether Lewis and William Clark. Both Lewis and Clark named Crooked Falls in their journals. Clark named three of the remaining waterfalls on his map: "Great Falls" (which retains its name to this day), "Beautiful Cascade" (now called Rainbow Falls), and "Upper Pitch" (now known as Black Eagle Falls). "Beautiful Cascade" was renamed "Rainbow Falls" in 1872 by Thomas B. Rogers, an engineer with the Great Northern Railway. Colter Falls received its name from Paris Gibson, in honor of John Colter (a member of the Lewis and Clark Expedition). Black Eagle Falls is named for the black eagle which built a nest in a cottonwood tree on an island in the middle of the falls. It is not clear when the falls lost their original name of "Upper Pitch," but they had acquired their modern name by at least 1877.

== Geological history ==
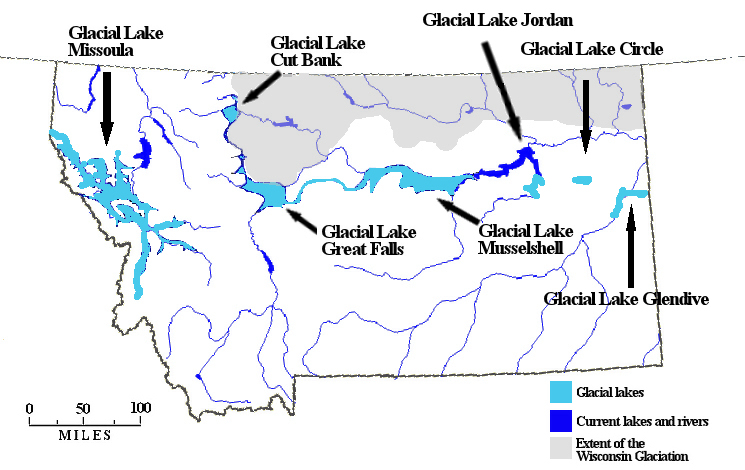
Map of Montana showing Glacial Lake Great Falls

The Missouri River lies atop the Great Falls Tectonic Zone, an intracontinental shear zone between two geologic provinces of basement rock of the Archean period which form part of the North American continent, the Hearne province and Wyoming province. Approximately 1.5 million years ago, the Missouri River, Yellowstone River and Musselshell River all flowed northward into a terminal lake. During the last glacial period, the Laurentide and Cordilleran ice sheets pushed these lakes and rivers southward. Between 15,000 and 11,000 BCE, the Laurentide Ice Sheet blocked the Missouri River and created Glacial Lake Great Falls. About 13,000 BCE, as the glacier retreated, Glacial Lake Great Falls emptied catastrophically in a glacial lake outburst flood. The current course of the Missouri River essentially marks the southern boundary of the Laurentide Ice Sheet. The Missouri, Yellowstone and Musselshell rivers flowed eastward around the glacial mass, eventually settling into their present courses. As the ice retreated, meltwater poured through the Highwood Mountains and eroded the mile-long, 500-foot-deep (150 m) Shonkin Sag—one of the most famous prehistoric meltwater channels in the world.

The Great Falls themselves formed on a fall line unconformity in the Great Falls Tectonic Zone. The Missouri River settled into a bedrock canyon which lay beneath the clay laid down by Glacial Lake Great Falls. The course of the Missouri in and around the Great Falls has changed very little since then, in comparison to lower regions of the river on the ground moraine that forms much of the upper Great Plains.

The Great Falls of the Missouri River formed because the Missouri is flowing over and through the Kootenai Formation, a mostly nonmarine sandstone laid down by rivers, glaciers, and lakes in the past. Some of the Kootenai Formation is marine, however, laid down by shallow seas. The river is eating away at the softer nonmarine sandstone, with the harder rock forming the falls themselves. Until relatively recently (in geologic time) the Missouri River in the area had a much wider channel, but it has now settled into its current course, where it will continue to cut more deeply into the sandstone.

== Discovery ==
=== Early inhabitants ===
The first human beings to see the Great Falls were Paleo-Indians who migrated into the area between 9,500 and 8,270 BCE. The earliest inhabitants of North America entered Montana east of the Continental Divide between the Cordilleran and Laurentide ice sheets. The area remained only sparsely inhabited, however. Salish Indians would often hunt bison in the area on a seasonal basis, but no permanent settlements existed near the Great Falls for much of prehistory. Around 1600, Piegan Blackfoot Indians, migrating west, entered the area, pushing the Salish back into the Rocky Mountains and claiming the area as their own. The Great Falls of the Missouri remained in the tribal territory of the Blackfeet until Americans claimed the region in 1803.

Although the discovery of the Great Falls by Native Americans is not recorded, the South Piegan Blackfeet were well-acquainted with the Great Falls by the late 18th century, and news of the cataracts had spread among native peoples as far east as central North Dakota.

=== Lewis and Clark ===
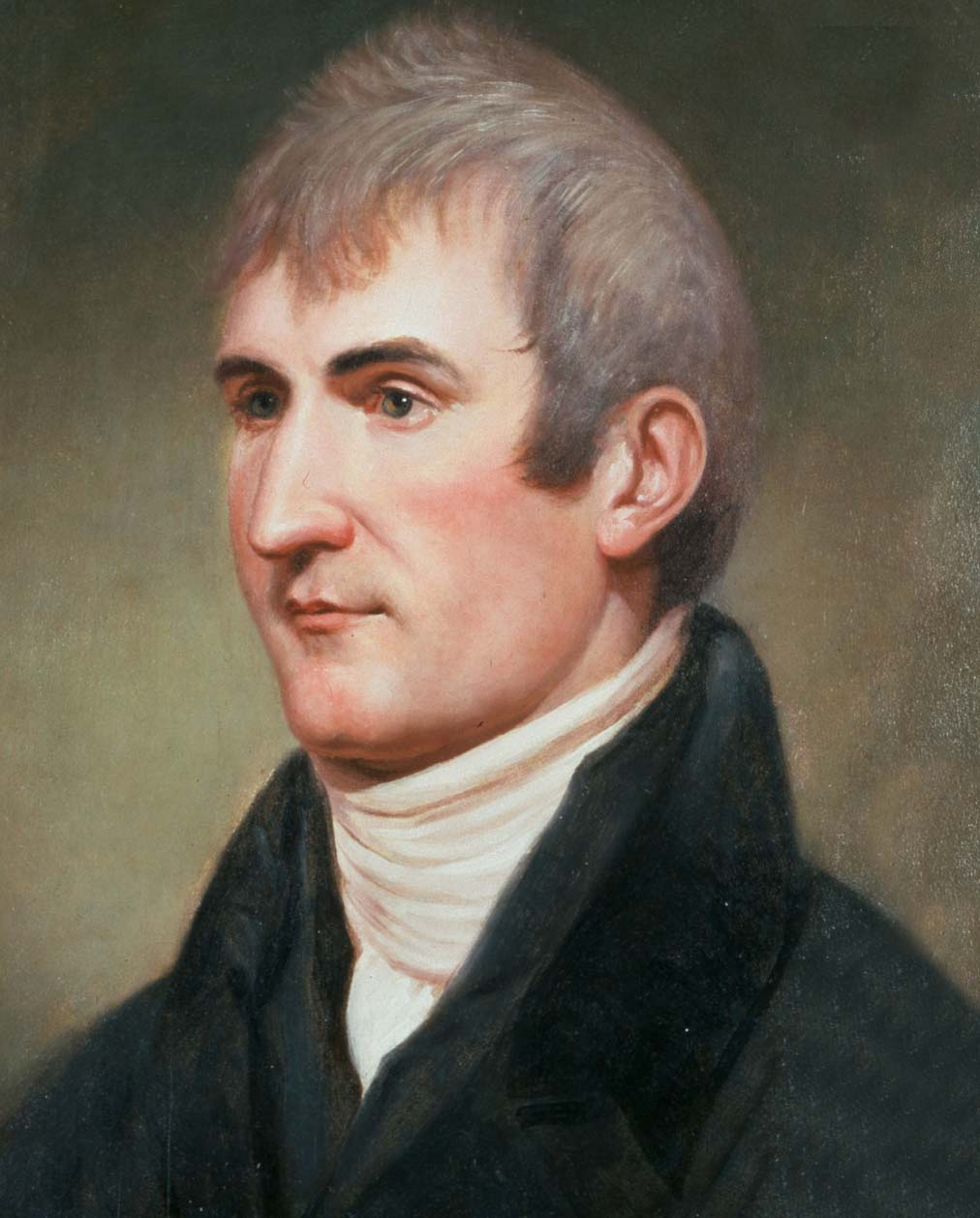
Meriwether Lewis

The United States purchased the area around the Great Falls of the Missouri from France (which claimed the area despite Native American habitation) in 1803, as part of the Louisiana Purchase. Thomas Jefferson, then President of the United States, had long desired to send an expedition into the area. Jefferson sought and won permission and funding for an expedition from Congress in January 1803. On May 14, 1804, the Lewis and Clark Expedition departed St. Louis, Missouri to map the course of the Missouri River; establish whether a river route to the Pacific Ocean existed; study the Indian tribes, botany, geology, terrain and wildlife in the region; and evaluate whether British and French Canadian hunters and trappers in the area posed a challenge to American control over the region. Expedition leaders Meriwether Lewis and William Clark first learned of the "great falls" from the Mandan Indians while wintering at Fort Mandan from November 2, 1804, until April 7, 1805.

The Lewis and Clark Expedition reached the Great Falls on June 13, 1805. Meriwether Lewis was the first White person to see the falls. Lewis described the encounter in a now-famous passage of his expedition diary:

...my ears were saluted with the agreeable sound of a fall of water and advancing a little further I saw the spray arrise above the plain like a column of smoke which would frequently dispear again in an instant caused I presume by the wind which blew pretty hard from the S. W. I did not however loose my direction to this point which soon began to make a roaring too tremendious to be mistaken for any cause short of the great falls of the Missouri. ... I hurryed down the hill which was about 200 feet high and difficult of access, to gaze on this sublimely grand spectacle. ... immediately at the cascade the river is about 300 yds. wide; about ninety or a hundred yards of this next the Lard. bluff is a smooth even sheet of water falling over a precipice of at least eighty feet, the remaining part of about 200 yards on my right formes the grandest sight I ever beheld, the height of the fall is the same of the other but the irregular and somewhat projecting rocks below receives the water in its passage down and brakes it into a perfect white foam which assumes a thousand forms in a moment sometimes flying up in jets of sparkling foam to the height of fifteen or twenty feet and are scarcely formed before large roling bodies of the same beaten and foaming water is thrown over and conceals them. in short the rocks seem to be most happily fixed to present a sheet of the whitest beaten froath for 200 yards in length and about 80 feet perpendicular. the water after descending strikes against the butment before mentioned or that on which I stand and seems to reverberate and being met by the more impetuous courant they role and swell into half formed billows of great height which rise and again disappear in an instant. this butment of rock defends a handsom little bottom of about three acres which is diversified and agreeably shaded with some cottonwood trees; in the lower extremity of the bottom there is a very thick grove of the same kind of trees which are small, in this wood there are several Indian lodges formed of sticks. ... from the reflection of the sun on the spray or mist which arrises from these falls there is a beatifull rainbow produced which adds not a little to the beauty of this majestically grand senery. after wrighting this imperfect discription I again viewed the falls and was so much disgusted with the imperfect idea which it conveyed of the scene that I determined to draw my pen across it and begin agin, but then reflected that I could not perhaps succeed better than pening the first impressions of the mind; I wished for the pencil of Salvator Rosa or the pen of Thompson, that I might be enabled to give to the enlightened world some just idea of this truly magnificent and sublimely grand object, which has from the commencement of time been concealed from the view of civilized man; but this was fruitless and vain. I most sincerely regretted that I had not brought a crimee obscura with me by the assistance of which even I could have hoped to have done better but alas this was also out of my reach; I therefore with the assistance of my pen only indeavoured to traces some of the stronger features of this seen by the assistance of which and my recollection aided by some able pencil I hope still to give to the world some faint idea of an object which at this moment fills me with such pleasure and astonishment, and which of its kind I will venture to ascert is second to but one in the known world. ...

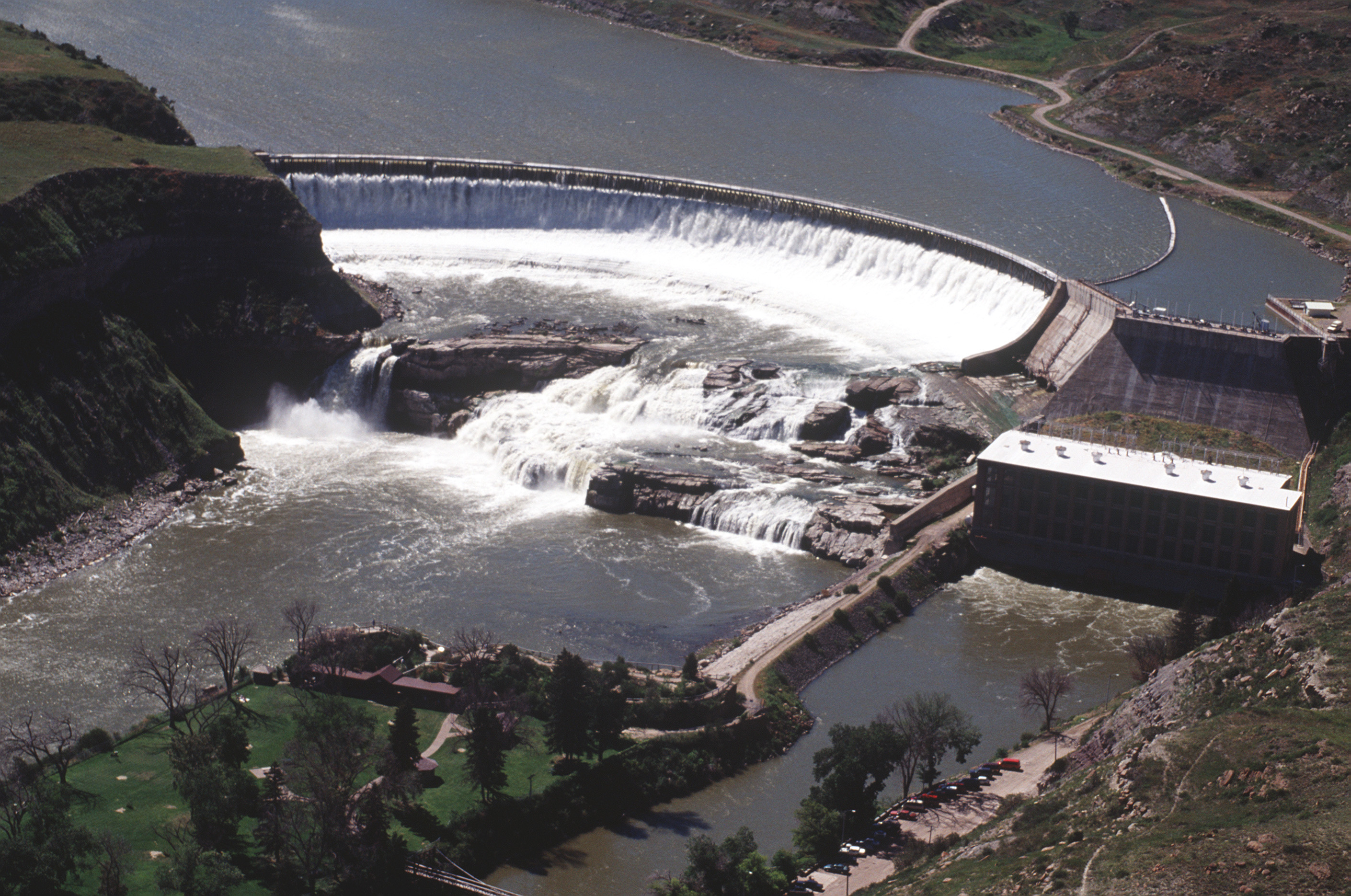
The Great Falls, or "Big Falls", and Ryan Dam in 1995

The falls which Lewis had seen were the lowest of the five falls, the Great Falls. Exploring the following day, Lewis discovered Crooked Falls, Rainbow Falls, Colter Falls, and Black Eagle Falls. At the final waterfalls, Lewis saw an amazing sight:

I arrived at another cataract of 26 feet. ... below this fall at a little distance a beatifull little Island well timbered is situated about the middle of the river. in this Island on a Cottonwood tree an Eagle has placed her nest; a more inaccessible spot I believe she could not have found; for neither man nor beast dare pass those gulphs which separate her little domain from the shores. the water is also broken in such manner as it descends over this pitch that the mist or sprey rises to a considerable height. this fall is certainly much the greatest I ever behald except those two which I have mentioned below. it is incomparably a greater cataract and a more noble interesting object than the celebrated falls of Potomac or Soolkiln &c.

Mounting a hill near Black Eagle Falls (probably where the town of Black Eagle is today), Lewis saw that the cataracts ended and that another large river joined the Missouri about two and a half miles further upstream. Although it was very late in the afternoon, Lewis rushed forward to see this river and was attacked by a grizzly bear. He ran more than 80 yards and launched himself into the Missouri River, and luckily the bear did not follow. The Lewis and Clark Expedition was forced to portage around the Great Falls, an arduous task that took nearly a month.

York, an African American slave owned by William Clark and who had participated in the Expedition, was the first black American to see the Great Falls.

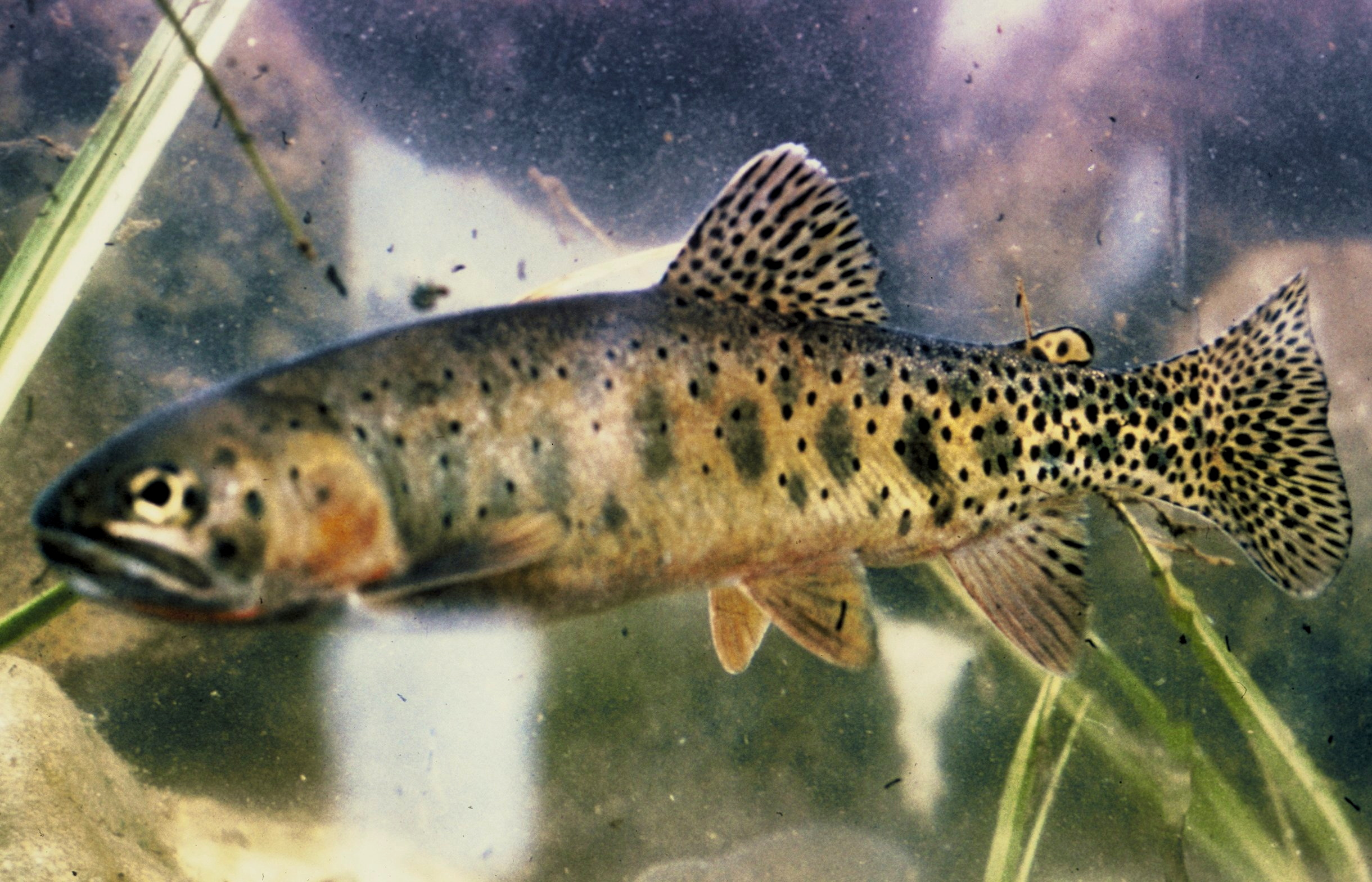
Westslope cutthroat trout, a fish written about by the Lewis and Clark Expedition at the Great Falls of the Missouri on June 13, 1805.

The Lewis and Clark Expedition made a number of discoveries near the Great Falls. On June 13, Silas Goodrich caught numerous Westslope cutthroat trout at the falls, the first time anyone in the expedition had seen these fish, and several samples were preserved which constituted the type specimens for the fish. The trout was subsequently given the scientific name Oncorhynchus clarki lewisi in honor of the expedition leaders. The Westslope cutthroat is now the "official state fish" of Montana. The explorers also collected the first samples of the gumbo evening primrose and western meadowlark at the Great Falls.

On June 18, while reconnoitering the series of falls on the south side of the Missouri River with a group of five others, William Clark discovered Giant Springs, which he correctly judged to be the largest spring in the world. He was the first white person to see the springs, and the first white person to see the falls from the south side of the Missouri.

Meriwether Lewis revisited the Great Falls on July 11, 1806, as the Corps of Discovery returned east. Lewis and nine men stopped at the Great Falls with the intention of exploring the Marias River and discovering its source. But during the night, Indians stole half the party's 17 horses, forcing three of the men to stay behind.

== Settlement of the area ==
Great Seal of the State of Montana, depicting the Great Falls of the Missouri

Following the return passage of Lewis and Clark in 1805/06 there is no record of any white man visiting the Great Falls of the Missouri until explorer and trapper Jim Bridger reached them in 1822. White people next visited the Great Falls when Bridger and Major Andrew Henry led a fur-trading expedition there in April 1823 (and were attacked by Blackfeet Indians while camping at the site). British explorer Alexander Ross trapped around the Great Falls in 1824. In 1838, a mapping expedition sent by the U.S. federal government and guided by Bridger spent four years in the area. Margaret Harkness Woodman became first white woman to see the Great Falls in 1862.

The first permanent settlement near the Great Falls was Fort Benton, established in 1846 about 40 miles (64 km) downstream from the Great Falls. The Great Falls marked the limit of the navigable section of the Missouri River, and the first steamboat arrived at the falls in 1859. In 1860, the Mullan Road linked Fort Benton with Fort Walla Walla in the Washington Territory.

Politically, the Great Falls of the Missouri River passed through numerous hands in the 19th century. It was part of the unincorporated frontier until May 30, 1854, when Congress established the Nebraska Territory. Indian attacks on white explorers and settlers dropped significantly after Isaac Stevens negotiated the Treaty of Hellgate in 1855, and white settlement in the area began to occur. On March 2, 1861, it became part of the Dakota Territory. The Great Falls were incorporated into the Idaho Territory on March 4, 1863, and then into the Montana Territory on May 28, 1864. It became part of the state of Montana upon that territory's admission to statehood on November 8, 1889.

The Great Falls of the Missouri River became the site of a permanent settlement in 1883. Businessman Paris Gibson visited the Great Falls in 1880, and was deeply impressed by the possibilities for building a major industrial city near the falls with power provided by hydroelectricity. He returned in 1883 with surveyors and platted a city (to be named Great Falls) on the south side of the river. The city's first citizen, Silas Beachley, arrived later that year. With investments from railroad owner James J. Hill and Helena businessman C. A. Broadwater, houses, a store, and a flour mill were established in 1884. A planing mill, lumber yard, bank, school, and newspaper were established in 1885. By 1887 the town had 1,200 citizens, and in October of that year the Great Northern Railway arrived in the city. Great Falls, Montana, was incorporated on November 28, 1888, Black Eagle Dam was built in 1890, and by 1912 Rainbow Dam and Volta Dam (now Ryan Dam) were all operating.

The city of Great Falls, Montana, derives its name from the waterfalls. The small town of Black Eagle, Montana, derives its name from Black Eagle Falls, and Cascade County (in which both are located) is named for the cataracts and rapids which make up the falls.

=== Dams ===
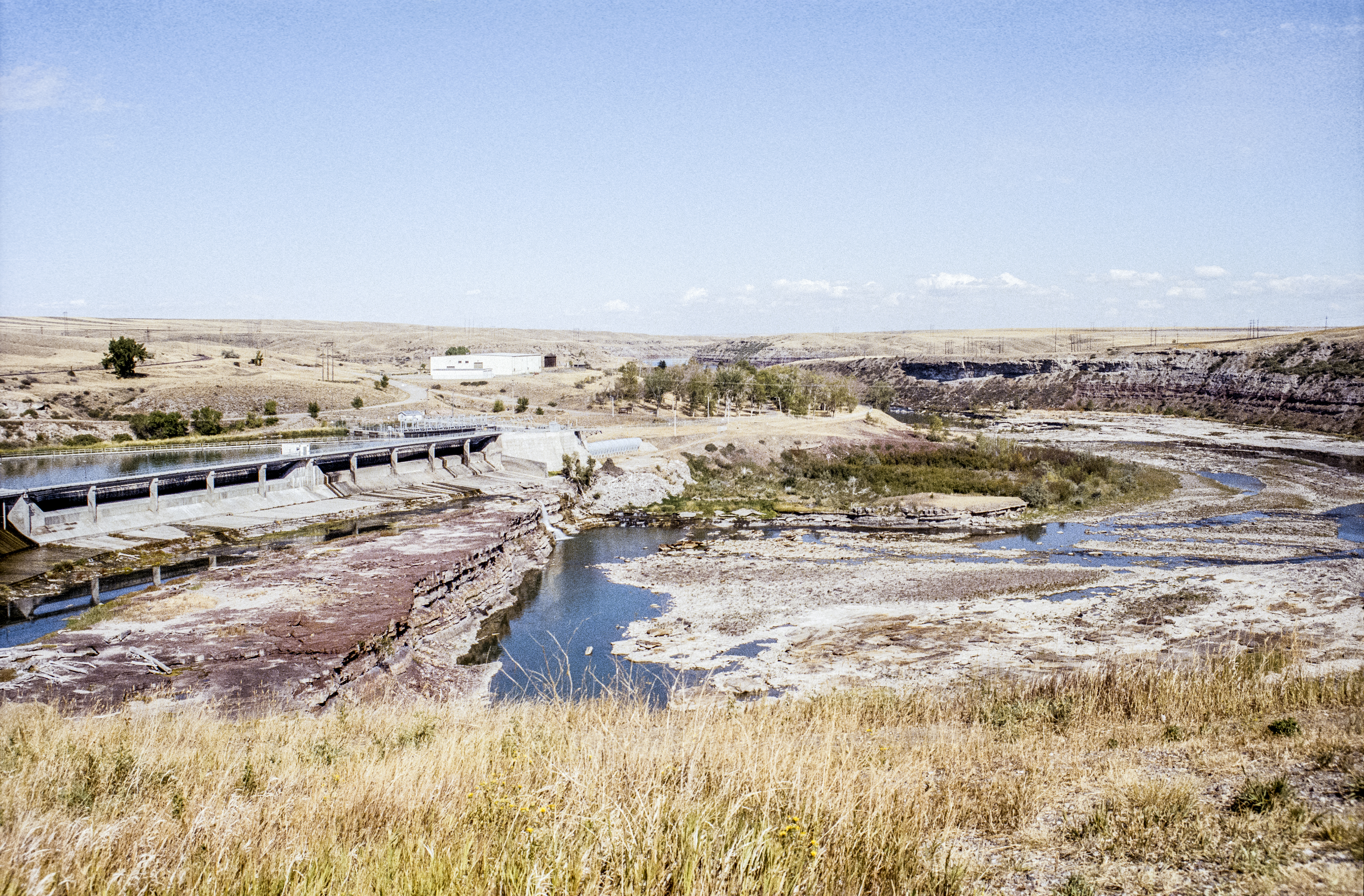
Rainbow Falls and dam in 2000.

Only one of the waterfalls that comprise the Great Falls of the Missouri River, Crooked Falls, exists in its natural state today. Dams built on the falls beginning in the 1880s have significantly altered and even submerged the five waterfalls. Black Eagle Dam was built in 1890, and half of Black Eagle Falls are now submerged in the reservoir behind the dam. This structure was the first hydroelectric dam built in the state.

Rainbow Falls was dammed in 1910 when Rainbow Dam was built. The reservoir behind the dam submerged Colter Falls.

Volta Dam was built on top of the Great Falls in 1915, and later renamed Ryan Dam in 1940 in honor of John D. Ryan, the president and founder of the Montana Power Company.

== Historic district and interpretive centers ==
The Great Falls Portage, a National Historic Landmark District designated in 1966, commemorates the route by which Lewis and Clark bypassed the falls. The landmarked areas, including the expedition camps at either end of the portage, are located well above and below the series falls. The Great Falls are also part of the Lewis and Clark National Historic Trail, established by Congress in 1978.

The Lewis and Clark National Historic Trail Interpretive Center was built in 1998 on a cliff overlooking the Missouri River near Crooked Falls. It provides an extensive look into Lewis and Clark's discovery of the Great Falls and their portage around them, as well as exhibits on native peoples of the area.

In 1989, the City of Great Falls, the Montana Department of Fish, Wildlife and Parks, and other public and private bodies established the River's Edge Trail, a 30-mile (48 km) series of paved and unpaved trails that follow the Great Falls as well as the Lewis and Clark Expedition portage route (along with other scenic and historic area of the City of Great Falls and town of Black Eagle).

== In art ==
The first known drawing of the Great Falls was entered by Meriwether Lewis in his diary. In 1807, Lewis commissioned the Irish engraver John James Barrelet to make drawings of the Great Falls. After Lewis's death in 1810, William Clark visited his home and found the drawings, but they have since disappeared.

The Great Falls have been depicted in well-known paintings over the years. The waterfalls may be seen in the background of John Mix Stanley's large painting "Barter for a Bride" (originally titled "A Family Group"), which was painted some time between 1854 and 1863 and now hangs in the Diplomatic Reception Room in the United States Department of State in Washington, D.C. The noted Western painter O. C. Seltzer depicted the cataracts in his 1927 work, "Lewis and Clark With Sacajawea at the Great Falls of the Missouri, 1804."

The first known photograph of the Great Falls was taken by noted Western photographer James D. Hutton about 1859 or 1860.

== See also ==
- List of waterfalls
