= Kootenai Formation =

Geologic formation in Montana/Idaho, U.S.

- Stratigraphic range: Aptian-Albian
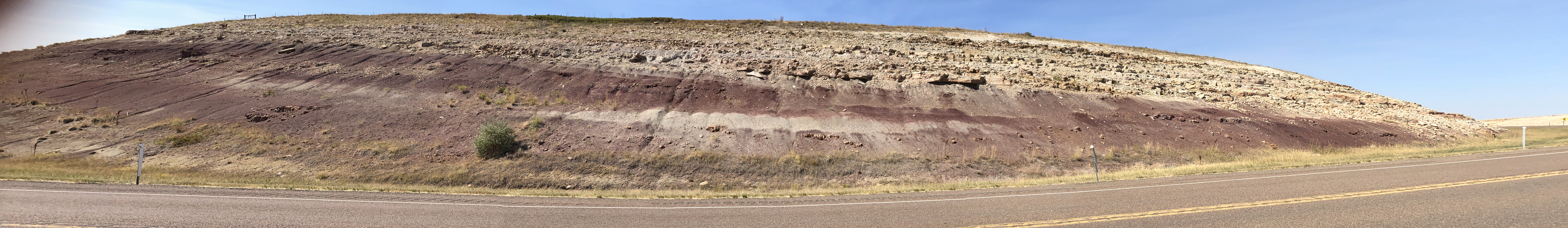
- Typical Kootenai Formation in a roadcut. Sunburst Sandstone Member overlying the red informally named member 2. Cascade County, Montana.
- Type: Geological formation
- Sub-units: Cut Bank Sandstone Member, Moulton Member, Pryor Conglomerate Member, Sunburst Sandstone Member.
- Underlies: Blackleaf Formation
- Overlies: Morrison Formation unconformably
- Thickness: 75 to 195 metres (246 to 640 ft)

Lithology
- Primary: Nonmarine mudstones, siltstones and sandstones

Location
- Region: Montana, Idaho
- Country: United States

Type section
- Named for: Kootenai Tribe who occupied western Montana and Alberta

The Kootenai Formation is a Lower Cretaceous geologic formation. The Kootenai was deposited in a foreland basin east of the Sevier thrust belt in western Montana. The lithology consists of a basal conglomerate with overlying non-marine sandstones, shales and lacustrine limestones.

The most common fossils found within the Kootenai Formation are gastropod, ostracod, and pelecypod shells. Dinosaur remains are among the fossils that have been recovered from the formation, although none have yet been referred to a specific genus.

== See also ==
- List of dinosaur-bearing rock formations
  - List of stratigraphic units with indeterminate dinosaur fossils
