= National Register of Historic Places listings in Cascade County, Montana =

Location of Cascade County in Montana

This is a list of the National Register of Historic Places listings in Cascade County, Montana. It is intended to be a complete list of the properties and districts on the National Register of Historic Places in Cascade County, Montana, United States. The locations of National Register properties and districts for which the latitude and longitude coordinates are included below, may be seen in a map.

There are 50 properties and districts listed on the National Register in the county, including 3 National Historic Landmarks.

This National Park Service list is complete through NPS recent listings posted August 28, 2026.

== Listings county-wide ==
	Name on the Register	Image	Date listed	Location	City or town	Description
1	J. C. Adams Stone Barn	J. C. Adams Stone Barn	January 12, 1979 (#79001399)	Northeast of Sun River off U.S. Route 89; 47°32′25″N 111°41′11″W	Sun River	
2	Albright Historic District		November 14, 2025 (#100012017)	38 Evans Riceville Road; 47°12′31″N 110°56′10″W	Belt	
3	Arvon Block	Arvon Block	September 26, 1991 (#91001446)	114-116 1st Ave., S. 47°30′14″N 111°18′15″W	Great Falls	
4	Baatz Block	Baatz Block	March 25, 2024 (#100010108)	400-402 2nd Avenue South; 47°30′11″N 111°18′02″W	Great Falls	
5	Belt Commercial Historic District	Belt Commercial Historic District	December 23, 2004 (#04001380)	Castner St. 47°23′12″N 110°55′39″W	Belt	
6	Belt Jail	Belt Jail	March 10, 1980 (#80002400)	Castner St. 47°23′08″N 110°55′40″W	Belt	
7	Burlingame School		June 1, 1992 (#92000575)	Address restricted	Belt	
8	Cascade County Courthouse	Cascade County Courthouse	April 16, 1980 (#80002401)	415 2nd Ave., N. 47°30′29″N 111°17′58″W	Great Falls	
9	Chicago, Milwaukee and St. Paul Passenger Depot	Chicago, Milwaukee and St. Paul Passenger Depot	October 13, 1988 (#88001119)	River Dr., N. 47°30′25″N 111°18′29″W	Great Falls	
10	Timothy Edwards Collins Mansion	Timothy Edwards Collins Mansion	August 27, 1980 (#80002402)	1003-1017 2nd Ave., NW. 47°30′36″N 111°19′43″W	Great Falls	
11	Crocker-Jarvi Homestead		June 1, 1992 (#92000572)	Address restricted	Belt	
12	East Side Neighborhood Historic District	East Side Neighborhood Historic District	April 19, 2016 (#16000185)	Central Ave. and 1st Ave. between 15th and 16th Sts. 47°30′21″N 111°16′51″W	Great Falls	
13	First Peoples Buffalo Jump	First Peoples Buffalo Jump	July 21, 2015 (#15000623)	First Peoples Buffalo Jump State Park; 47°28′46″N 111°31′27″W	Ulm vicinity	Either the largest buffalo jump in North America, or the world; and maybe the most utilized.
14	First United Methodist Church Parsonage	First United Methodist Church Parsonage	December 23, 2003 (#03001329)	113 6th St., N. 47°30′26″N 111°17′47″W	Great Falls	
15	Lee M. Ford House	Lee M. Ford House	August 10, 1990 (#90001215)	401 4th Ave., N. 47°30′37″N 111°18′00″W	Great Falls	
16	Fort Shaw Historic District and Cemetery	Fort Shaw Historic District and Cemetery	January 11, 1985 (#85000065)	1 mile northwest of Fort Shaw; 47°30′36″N 111°49′13″W	Fort Shaw	
17	Franklin School	Franklin School	August 8, 2025 (#100012075)	820 1st Avenue SW; 47°30′24″N 111°19′36″W	Great Falls	
18	Great Falls Central Business Historic District	Great Falls Central Business Historic District	August 20, 2004 (#04000374)	2nd Ave., N., 1st Ave., N., Central Ave., and 1st Ave., S. 47°30′21″N 111°17′54″W	Great Falls	
19	Great Falls Central High School	Great Falls Central High School	September 1, 1976 (#76001120)	1400 1st Ave., N. 47°30′21″N 111°16′55″W	Great Falls	
20	Great Falls High School Historic District	Great Falls High School Historic District	March 20, 2013 (#13000097)	1900 2nd Ave., S. 47°30′05″N 111°16′29″W	Great Falls	
21	Great Falls Northside Residential Historic District	Great Falls Northside Residential Historic District	April 1, 1991 (#91000355)	200-900 blocks of 4th Ave., N., the 100-900 blocks of 3rd Ave., N., and the 500-900 blocks of 2nd Ave., N. 47°30′32″N 111°17′50″W	Great Falls	
22	Great Falls Portage	Great Falls Portage	October 15, 1966 (#66000429)	Southeast of Great Falls at the junction of U.S. Routes 87, 89, and 91; 47°31′52″N 111°09′05″W	Great Falls	
23	Great Falls Railroad Historic District	Great Falls Railroad Historic District	February 19, 1993 (#93000038)	Park and River Drs., the 100-400 blocks of 2nd St., S., the 100-200 blocks of 1st and 2nd Aves., S., and the 100-300 blocks of 3rd St., S. 47°30′14″N 111°17′48″W	Great Falls	
24	Great Falls West Bank Historic District	Great Falls West Bank Historic District	August 30, 2010 (#10000587)	300 and 400 blocks of 3rd Ave. NW; 47°30′44″N 111°18′58″W	Great Falls	
25	Hardy Bridge	Hardy Bridge	January 4, 2010 (#09001180)	Milepost 6 on Old U.S. Route 91; 47°10′01″N 111°50′04″W	Cascade	
26	Heikkila-Mattila Homestead		June 1, 1992 (#92000573)	Address restricted	Belt	
27	Kraftenberg Homestead		June 1, 1992 (#92000574)	Address restricted	Belt	
28	Lewis-Nevala Homestead		June 1, 1992 (#92000576)	Address restricted	Belt	
29	Margaret Block	Margaret Block	August 2, 1984 (#84002447)	413-415 Central Ave. 47°30′20″N 111°17′57″W	Great Falls	
30	Masonic Temple	Masonic Temple	December 28, 2000 (#00001568)	821 Central Ave. 47°30′26″N 111°17′32″W	Great Falls	
31	Monarch Depot Historic District	Monarch Depot Historic District	November 12, 2020 (#100005745)	10 Montana Ave. 47°05′57″N 110°50′18″W	Monarch	
32	Mullan Road	Mullan Road	March 13, 1975 (#75001080)	North of Great Falls in the Benton Lake National Wildlife Refuge; 47°41′49″N 111°19′10″W	Great Falls	Extends into Benewah and Kootenai counties in Idaho
33	Neihart School	Neihart School	March 7, 2003 (#03000089)	200 S. Main St. 46°55′45″N 110°43′51″W	Neihart	
34	Northern Montana State Fairground Historic District	Northern Montana State Fairground Historic District	January 13, 1989 (#88003143)	3rd St., NW. 47°30′40″N 111°19′03″W	Great Falls	
35	Old U.S. Highway 91 Historic District	Old U.S. Highway 91 Historic District	August 27, 2013 (#13000624)	Between I-15 Spring Cr. (Exit 219) & Hardy Cr. (Exit 247) Interchanges; 46°55′19″N 112°07′21″W	Wolf Creek vicinity	Alignment of Old United States Route 91 along Missouri River.
36	Harry E. Randall House	Harry E. Randall House	March 27, 1986 (#86000583)	1003 4th Ave., N. 47°30′36″N 111°17′21″W	Great Falls	
37	Roberts Building	Roberts Building	September 12, 1985 (#85002165)	520-526 Central Ave. 47°30′18″N 111°17′49″W	Great Falls	
38	Charles M. Russell House and Studio	Charles M. Russell House and Studio	October 15, 1966 (#66000430)	1217-1219 4th Ave., N. 47°30′36″N 111°17′05″W	Great Falls	
39	Charlie and Nancy Russell Honeymoon Cabin	Charlie and Nancy Russell Honeymoon Cabin	December 16, 2005 (#05001408)	20 Russell Dr., S. 47°16′12″N 111°41′53″W	Cascade	
40	St. Peter's Mission Church and Cemetery	St. Peter's Mission Church and Cemetery	August 3, 1984 (#84002452)	West of Cascade; 47°18′02″N 111°55′14″W	Cascade	
41	Stone Homestead		June 1, 1992 (#92000577)	Address restricted	Belt	
42	Tenth Street Bridge	Tenth Street Bridge	April 25, 1996 (#96000480)	10th St. across the Missouri River; 47°31′20″N 111°17′22″W	Great Falls	
43	Tower Rock	Tower Rock	March 18, 2002 (#02000213)	8 miles south of Cascade at Interstate 15 interchange 247; 47°11′00″N 111°48′51″W	Cascade	
44	Ulm Pishkun	Ulm Pishkun	December 17, 1974 (#74001093)	Address restricted	Ulm	
45	Union Bethel African Methodist Episcopal Church	Union Bethel African Methodist Episcopal Church	September 11, 2003 (#03000924)	916 5th Ave., S. 47°29′58″N 111°17′25″W	Great Falls	
46	Ursuline Academy	Ursuline Academy	September 26, 1991 (#91001447)	2300 Central Ave. 47°30′15″N 111°15′58″W	Great Falls	
47	US Post Office and Courthouse-Great Falls	US Post Office and Courthouse-Great Falls	March 14, 1986 (#86000681)	215 1st Ave., N. 47°30′24″N 111°18′11″W	Great Falls	
48	Robert Vaughn Homestead	Robert Vaughn Homestead	June 14, 1982 (#82003160)	Vaughn Cemetery Rd. (Cascade County Rd.); 47°32′58″N 111°33′14″W	Vaughn	
49	O.S. Warden Bridge	O.S. Warden Bridge	March 26, 2012 (#12000168)	10th Ave. S. across Missouri River; 47°29′36″N 111°18′46″W	Great Falls	part of the Montana's Steel Stringer and Steel Girder Bridges Multiple Property Submission
50	Wargelin-Warila Homestead		June 1, 1992 (#92000578)	Address restricted	Belt	

== Former listings ==
	Name on the Register	Image	Date listed	Date removed	Location	City or town	Description
1	YMCA Building	YMCA Building	October 31, 1985 (#85003399)	June 3, 1986	101 First Ave. N	Great Falls	Demolished in 1986.

== See also ==
- List of National Historic Landmarks in Montana
- National Register of Historic Places listings in Montana
