= Arvon Block =

- U.S. National Register of Historic Places
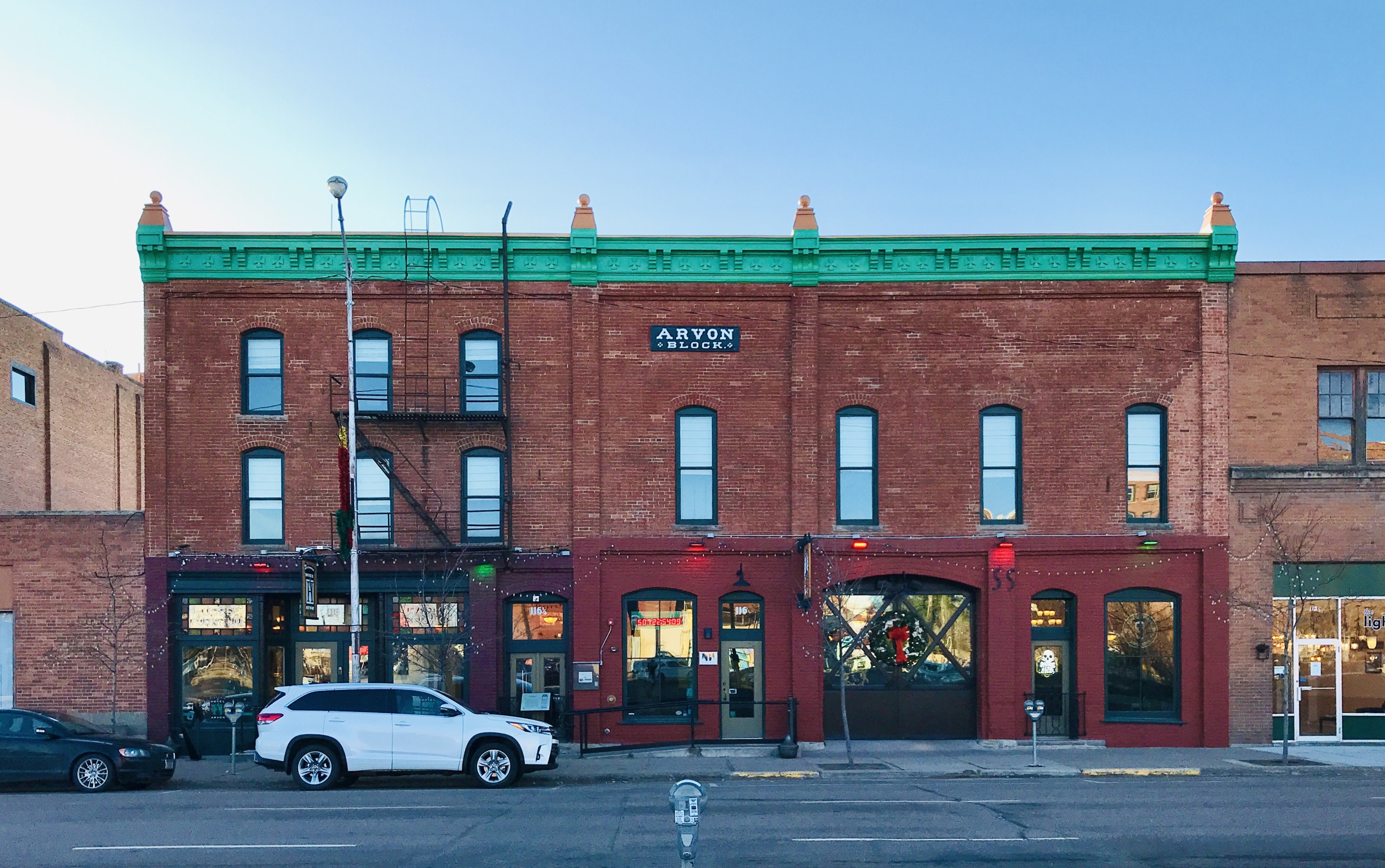
- Arvon Block in 2019
- Location: 114–116 First Avenue South, Great Falls, Montana, U.S.
- Built: 1890
- Website: https://www.hotelarvon.com/home
- NRHP reference No.: 91001446
- Added to NRHP: September 26, 1991

The Arvon Block is a historic building located in Great Falls, Montana, in the United States. Constructed from 1889 to 1890 by wealthy rancher and city booster Robert Vaughn in the Western Commercial architectural style, the buildings are some of the oldest in the city of Great Falls. They originally functioned as a hotel, and served passengers arriving in the city via train on the Montana Central Railway. The single structure was later divided internally into three buildings, now housing a boutique hotel, and an Irish-themed pub and restaurant. The Arvon Block was added to the National Register of Historic Places on September 26, 1991.

Geographically, the Arvon Block is within the Great Falls Railroad Historic District but is a stand-alone NRHP structure in its own right, not a contributing property. The Arvon Block is adjacent to the Great Falls Central Business Historic District.

== Overview ==
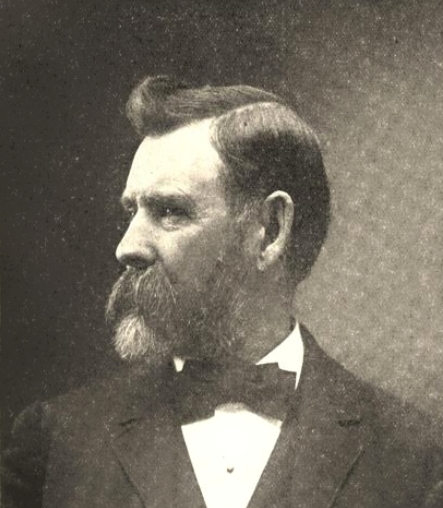
Robert Vaughn

The Arvon Block building was constructed by Robert Vaughn. Born in Wales in 1836, he emigrated to the United States in 1858. After some years spent with relatives, he arrived in the Montana Territory (which had been carved out of the Idaho Territory on May 28, 1864, while he was journeying there). He was the first homesteader in what was then Chouteau County (one of the nine original counties of Montana, which at the time covered about a sixth of the state), where he established a large farm and cattle and horse ranch on the Sun River near what is now the town of Vaughn, Montana. He built a luxurious two-story, sandstone mansion on the site of his homestead. He married 31-year-old Elizabeth Donahue, on August 26, 1886. She died on January 13, 1888, just 13 days after giving birth to the couple's first daughter and only child, Arvonia. Vaughn sold his ranch to "Captain" Thomas Couch, a Cornish immigrant and expert miner who managed the Boston and Montana Consolidated Copper and Silver Mining Company.

The city of Great Falls was founded in 1883. Businessman Paris Gibson visited the Great Falls of the Missouri River in 1880, and was deeply impressed by the possibilities for building a major industrial city near the falls with power provided by hydroelectricity. He returned in 1883 with Vaughn and several surveyors, and platted a permanent settlement the south side of the river. The city's first citizen, Silas Beachley, arrived later that year. With investments from railroad owner James J. Hill and Helena businessman Charles Arthur Broadwater, houses, a store, and a flour mill were established in 1884. By 1887 the town had 1,200 citizens, and in October of that year the Great Northern Railway arrived in the city. Great Falls was incorporated on November 28, 1888.

Beginning in 1889, Vaughn began construction on two major developments in the new city of Great Falls. One was the "Vaughn Block", an apartment building at the corner of Central Avenue and Third Street South. The other was the "Arvon Block". Both were completed in 1890.

Robert Vaughn died in 1918.

=== Description of the building ===
Throughout the 1890s, numerous two- and three-story brick warehouses were constructed south of Central Avenue in Great Falls. The brick and stone Arvon Block was a notable exception because it was a hotel and stable. The structure was built in the Western Commercial architectural style, a design which emphasized square and rectangular structures of brick or stone with tall, often arched or pointed-arch windows; broad overhangs with large brackets beneath; parapets; and little decoration. The Arvon Block was both a 40-room hotel and as well as a stable. Its location near the terminal of the Montana Central Railway made it a convenient option for rail passengers.

The eastern two-thirds of the building contained the hotel. (By at least 1895, retail businesses began using the ground floor of the hotel side of the building.) The western third contained the Axtell Stables. The stables were of a unique design: A ramp led horses down to stalls in the basement. The ground floor housed a horse tack store, where anyone in town could purchase bridles, saddles, and similar gear. The second floor of the stable portion of the building served as housing for the stablehands and drivers. A hayloft on the third floor had chutes which passed through the second and first floors and into the basement.

=== Recent developments ===
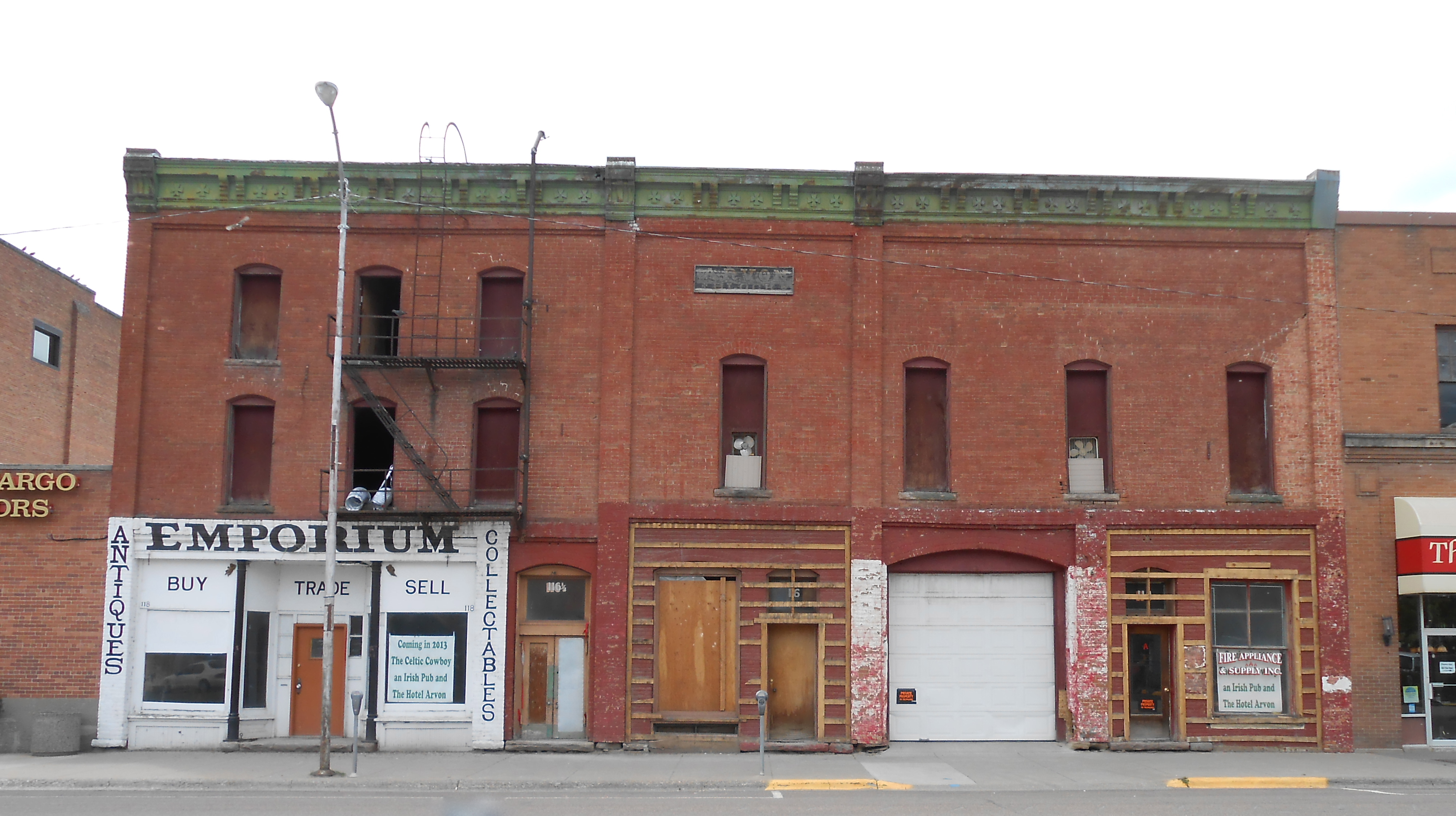
Arvon Block in 2013, prior to renovation

By 2001, the Arvon Block was one of the few remaining structures from the city's early days, and was among the city's oldest buildings. The building had been used for a variety of purposes, including apartment housing, an automobile mechanic's garage, an antique store, and a fire and safety equipment wholesaler. By 2008, the Arvon Block was owned by businessman Zollie Kelman. Although structurally sound, the roof leaked.

In 2005, the Montana state legislature enacted the Montana Main Street Program. Implemented by the Montana Department of Commerce using guidelines for economic development and historic preservation developed by the National Trust for Historic Preservation, the program helps applicant communities preserve as well as revitalize their downtown business districts. Great Falls joined the Montana Main Street Program shortly after it was inaugurated, and began working on a master plan for the city's downtown business district.

In 2011, the Kelman estate was one of four property owners in the downtown business district to receive a grant from the city of Great Falls (via the Main Street program and the Great Falls Business Improvement District) to begin the process of revisualizing and renovating the Arvon Block. Architectural design specialist Joe Lawniczak worked with the Zellman estate to produce architectural drawings in May 2011 that visualized a renovated building. The following year, the City-County Historic Preservation Office provided the Zellman estate with a Technical Assistance Grant to cover half the cost of conducting a study to determine the financial feasibility of renovating the Arvon Block while retaining its historic nature. Randy Hafer, an architect with High Plains Architects (a Billings firm) assisted in assessing the building.

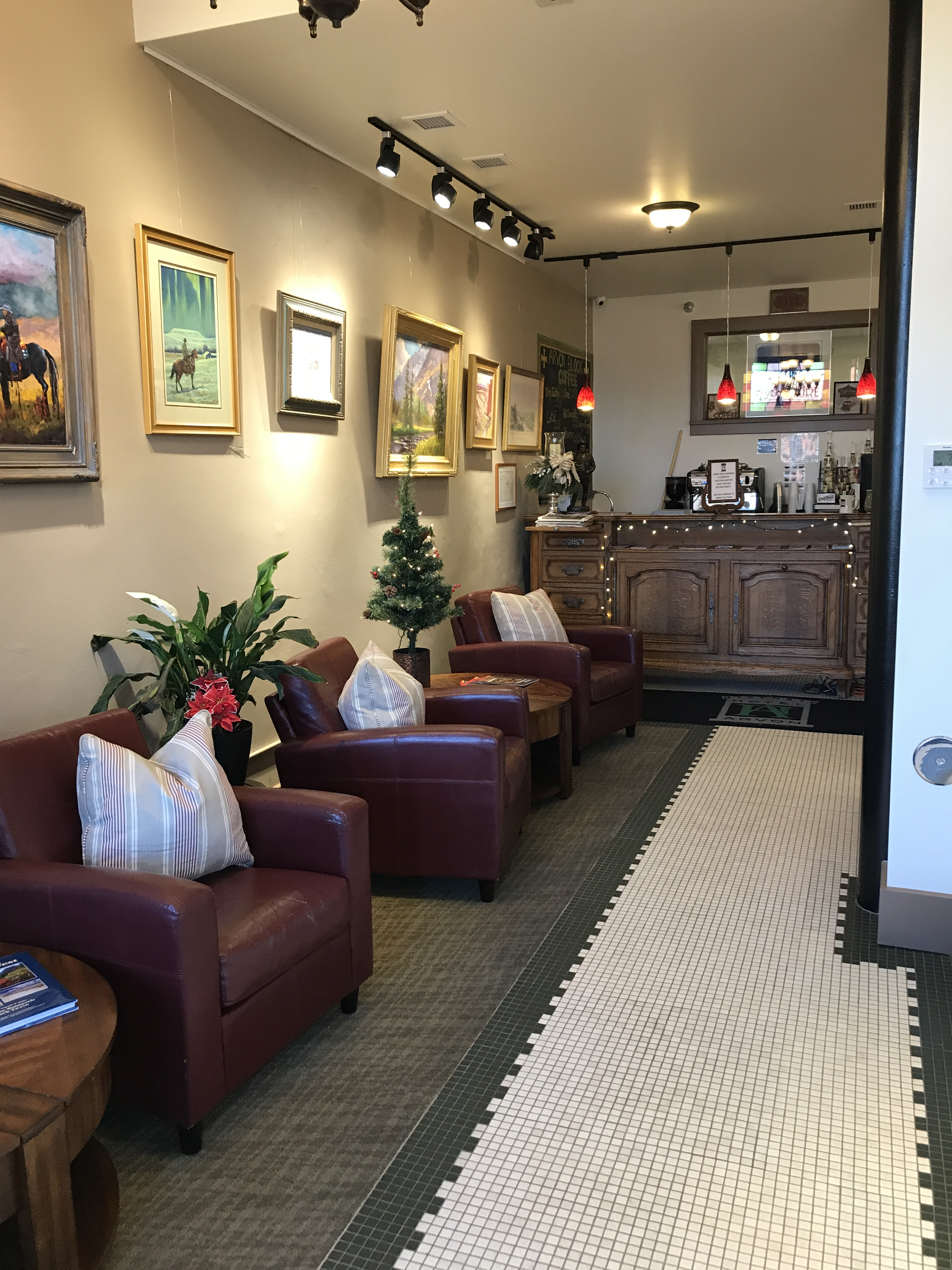
Lobby of the renovated Hotel Arvon, 2019

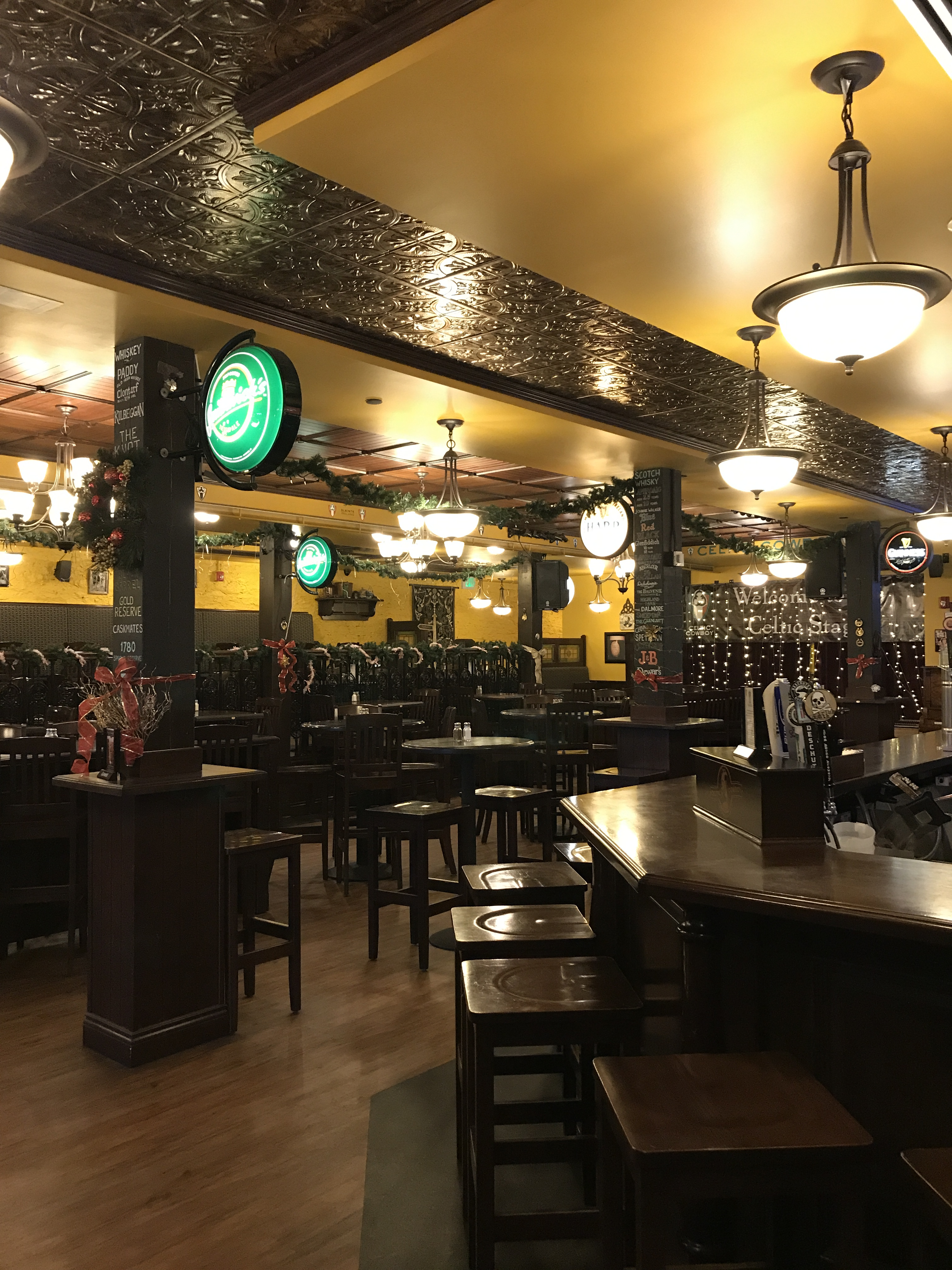
The Celtic Cowboy Pub and Restaurant, 2019

The Arvon Block was sold in October 2012 as plans moved ahead for its renovation. The Zellman estate sold the structure to a consortium of five individuals: Hafer; Mac Smith, a local attorney; Dr. Peter Jennings, a local veterinarian; Wayne Thares (owner of the local restaurant Taco John's and of a local Pepsi-Cola bottling operation); and Channing Hartelius (a local attorney). The five investors planned to turn the Arvon Block into a boutique hotel, with a 4,500-square-foot (420 m^{2}), Irish-themed bar on the first floor. The bar, to be owned by Thares and Hartelius, would be a franchise of The Irish Pub Co., a company which specialized in building Irish-themed bars. "The Celtic Cowboy," one of Robert Vaughn's nicknames, was chosen as the name of the pub. The investors agreed to spend $3.5 million to renovate the building and build the hotel and pub. About 25 percent of the cost would be paid for with historic and other tax credits. Work on the project was expected to begin in January 2013 and be complete by early summer 2013. Days later, the Great Falls Tribune reported that the owners of the Glacier State Electric building at 112 First Avenue South (next door to the west of the Arvon Block) had also received a Technical Assistance Grant and a renovation feasibility study was being conducted.

After a $3.5 million renovation, The Celtic Cowboy pub and restaurant opened three months late in November 2013. The Darkhorse Hall and Darkhorse Wine Snug, in the basement of the structure, opened on October 31, 2014 (a year late). The hall and snug featured a wine bar, private lockers which patrons could lease to store wine, and a meeting and banquet space. Work continued in November 2014 on the boutique hotel, which opened in September 2015 (two years late). The Darkhouse Wine Club, a subscription-based service of the Darkhorse Wine Snug, also opened .

== Name ==
"Arvon" is an Anglicized version of the Welsh word "Arfon". Arfon references the Welsh medieval administrative district Cantref Arfon. This area figures prominently in Welsh mythology. In the fourth saga of the Mabinogi (the collection of great medieval stories of Wales), it is the home of several heroes and kings.

Robert Vaughn named his daughter Arvonia after this mythological region, and a masculine form of her name graces the building.

== Bibliography ==
- Federal Writers' Project. Montana: A State Guide Book. Washington, D.C.: Federal Works Agency, Work Projects Administration, 1939.
- "Great Falls, Montana." In Encyclopedia of the Great Plains. David J. Wishart, ed. Lincoln, Neb.: University of Nebraska Press, 2004.
- Malone, Michael P. James J. Hill: Empire Builder of the Northwest. Reprint ed. Stillwater, Okla.: University of Oklahoma Press, 1996.
- Vaughn, Robert. Then and Now, or, Thirty-Six Years in the Rockies: Personal Reminiscences of Some of the First Pioneers of the State of Montana: Indians and Indian Wars: The Past and Present of the Rocky Mountain Country: 1864-1900. Minneapolis: Tribune Printing Co., 1900.
- Walters, Dale. "Introduction." In Then and Now, or, Thirty-Six Years in the Rockies: Personal Reminiscences of Some of the First Pioneers of the State of Montana. By Robert Vaughn. Reprint ed. Helena, Mont.: Farcountry Press, 2001.
