= H. N. Black =

American architect

Henry Nelson Black
- Born: August 1, 1854; Malden, Massachusetts
- Died: October 28, 1922 (aged 68); Great Falls, Montana, U.S.
- Resting place: Highland Cemetery, Great Falls, Montana, U.S.
- Occupation: Architect

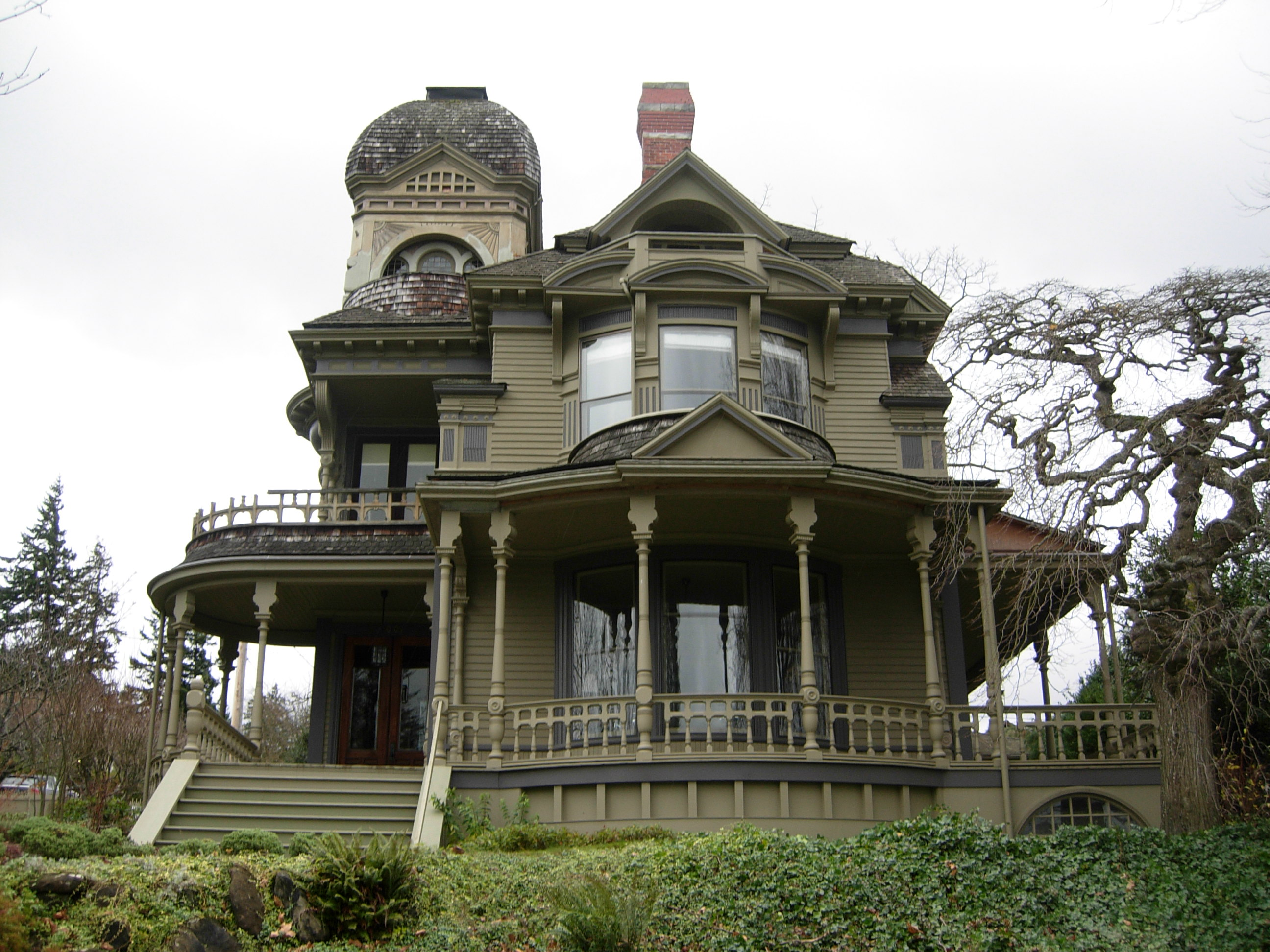
The Gamwell House in Bellingham, Washington, designed by Black and Longstaff.

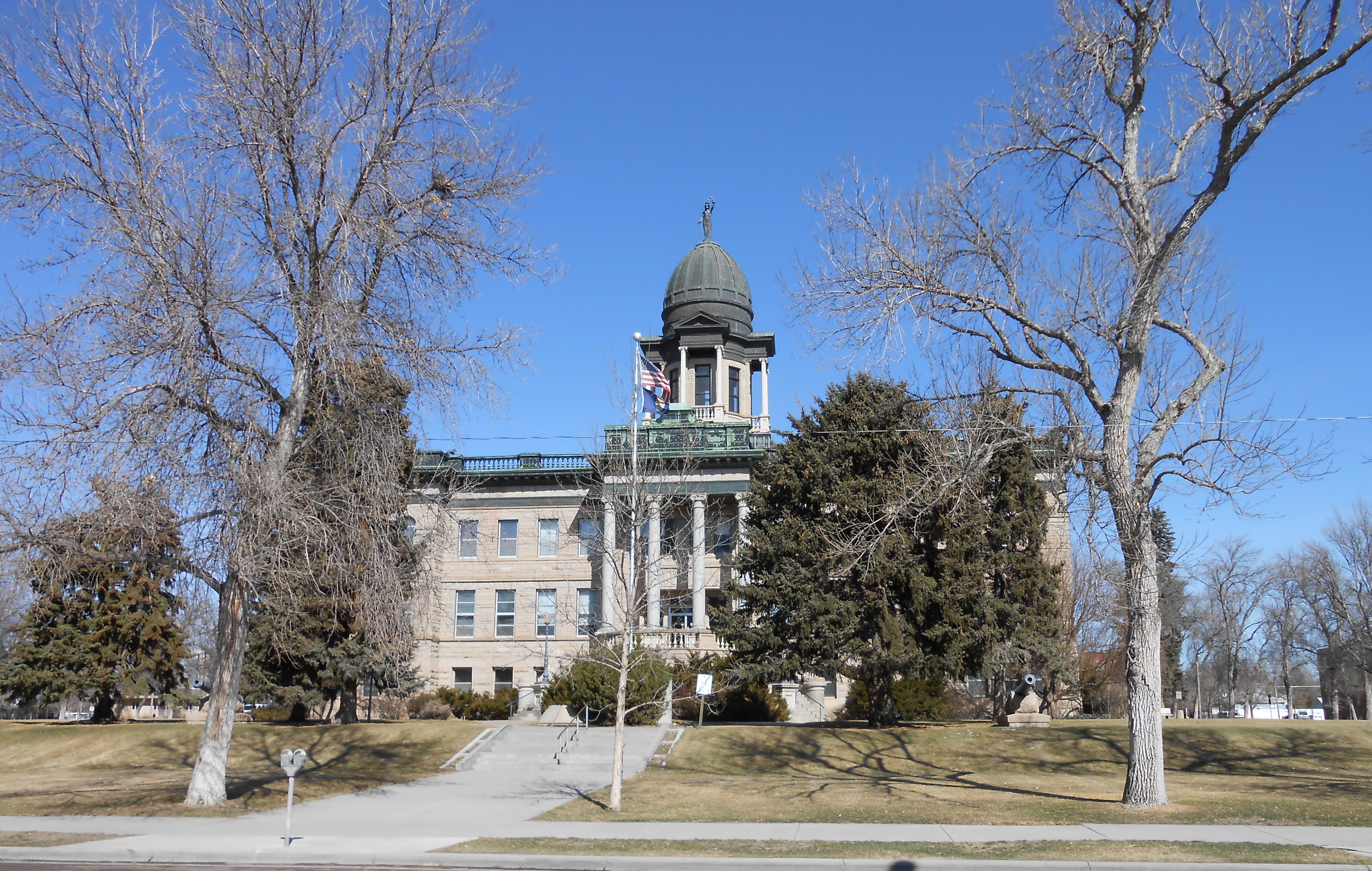
The Cascade County Courthouse in Acadconda, Montana, designed by Black and Longstaff.

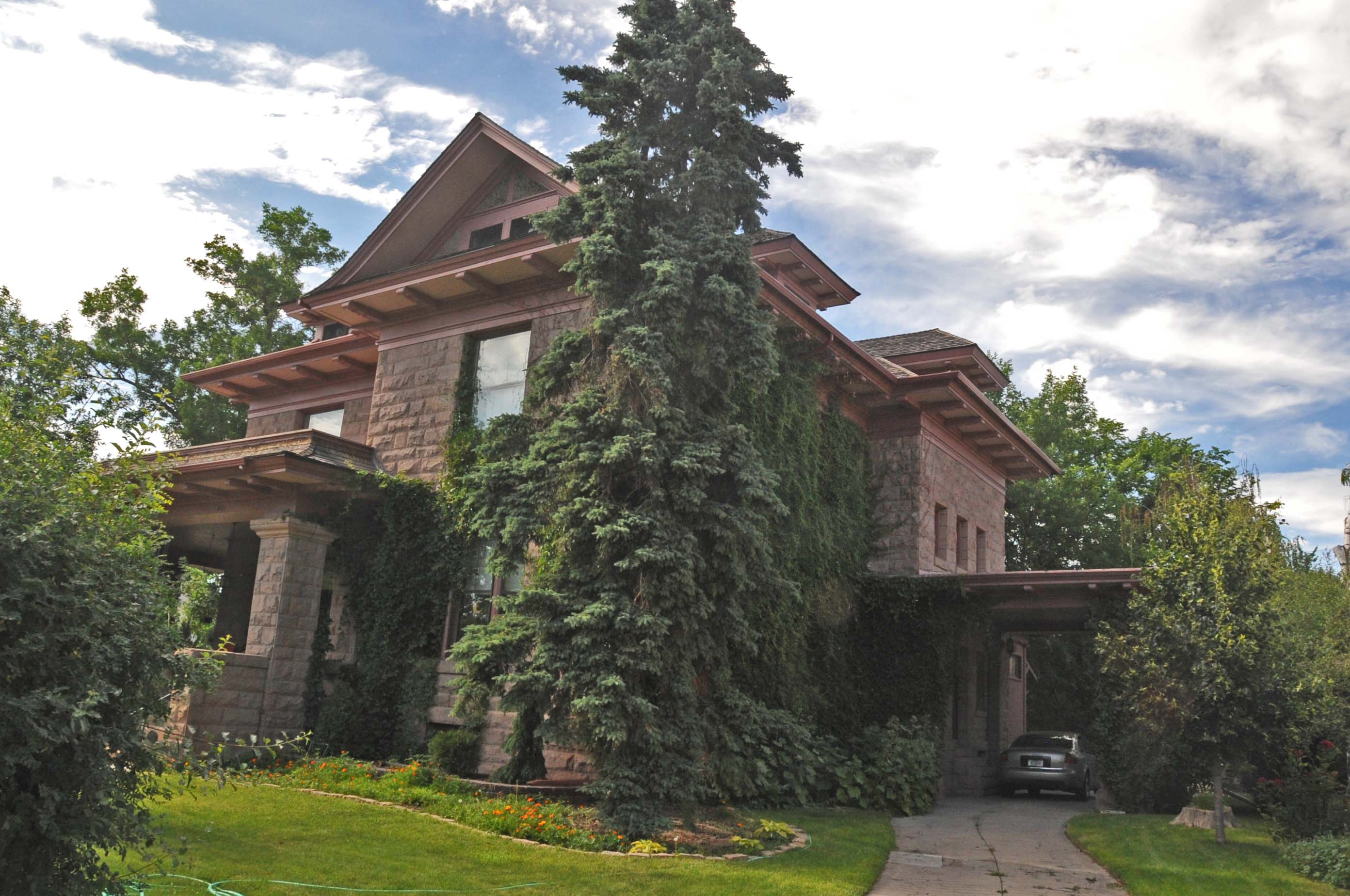
The Lee M. Ford House in Great Falls, Montana, designed by Black.

H. N. Black (August 1, 1854 - October 28, 1922) was an American architect who designed many buildings in the Western United States, including Washington, Idaho and Montana, some of which are listed on the National Register of Historic Places.

== Early life ==
Black was born on August 1, 1854, in Malden, Massachusetts. He was educated near Boston.

== Career ==
With Frank Longstaff, Black designed the Gamwell House in Bellingham, Washington, completed in 1892. It is listed on the National Register of Historic Places. The two men designed many more buildings in Fairhaven, Bellingham, Washington.

Black moved to Montana in 1895. With Longstaff, he designed the NRHP-listed Cascade County Courthouse in Great Falls, Montana, completed in 1901–1903. Black designed many more buildings in Anaconda.

Black designed the NRHP-listed First Methodist Church in Moscow, Idaho, completed in 1904.

Black also designed many buildings in Great Falls, Montana, including "schools, commercial blocks, churches, and residences" like the Lee M. Ford House, completed in 1908. It is also listed on the NRHP.

== Death ==
Black died of paralysis and diabetes on October 28, 1922, in Great Falls, Montana. He was buried in Highland Cemetery, Great Falls.
