= Robert Vaughn (Montana rancher) =

19th-century rancher and businessman in Montana, United States

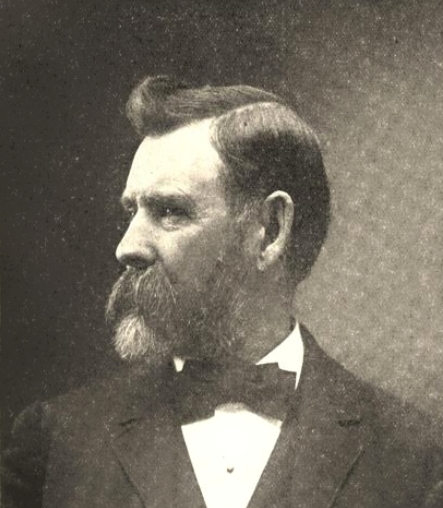
- Robert Vaughn in 1900
- Born: Robert Vaughan; June 5, 1836; Near Dinas Mawddwy, Merionethshire, Wales, UK
- Died: March 23, 1918 (aged 81); Great Falls, Montana, US
- Occupations: Miner, rancher, farmer, businessman
- Spouse(s): Elizabeth Donahue Vaughn (1886-1888; her death); 1 child Ella De Vee (married 1893– divorced 189?)
- Children: Arnovia Elizabeth Vaughn

Robert Vaughn (born Robert Vaughan; June 5, 1836 – March 23, 1918) was a Welsh immigrant to the United States and an important rancher, farmer, and businessman in the U.S. state of Montana during the years before and after its statehood. He homesteaded the Vaughn ranch in the Sun River valley in Montana, building a sandstone mansion as his home there. The town of Vaughn, Montana, is named in his honor. He also helped co-found the city of Great Falls, where he built the Arvon Block, a hotel and stable and one of the city's earliest buildings; the ranch and the hotel are both listed on the National Register of Historic Places.

== Early life and career ==
Robert Vaughan was born on June 5, 1836, to Edward and Elizabeth Vaughan. The family lived near the village of Dinas Mawddwy in what was at the time the county of Meirionnydd (now the southeast part of the county of Gwynedd) in Wales, United Kingdom. He was the third of six children. His siblings included Jane, Hugh, Robert, Edward, John, and Mary. His father was a warden of the royal forest. He was educated minimally at home, worked on the family farm, and attended the Anglican Church in Wales. He spoke Welsh at home, but no English.

Vaughan left home at the age of 19 to take a position as a gardener for the wealthy banker Benjamin Heywood Jones in Liverpool (where his sister Jane lived). There he learned English, and in the fall of 1858 he traveled to Rome, New York, in the United States, to visit his brother Hugh, who had emigrated to the U.S. a year earlier. Vaughan traveled to America without telling his parents (doing so only after he arrived), and fully intended to return to Wales. After three months, he traveled to Palmyra, New York, to visit his father's sister. He stayed there a year, then moved to Youngstown, Ohio, where he worked as a coal miner and farmer. Vaughan then moved from Youngstown to live with Hugh in McLean County, Illinois, where he assisted on his brother's farm for three months in the summer of 1863 before moving to Fairbury, Illinois, where he mined coal.

Shortly after arriving in the United States, Vaughan resolved to become an American citizen. The official who filled out the paperwork misspelled his name as "Vaughn", an error noticed only after his citizenship had been approved. To avoid legal difficulties, Vaughan used the erroneous spelling for the rest of his life.

== Travel to and early life in Montana ==
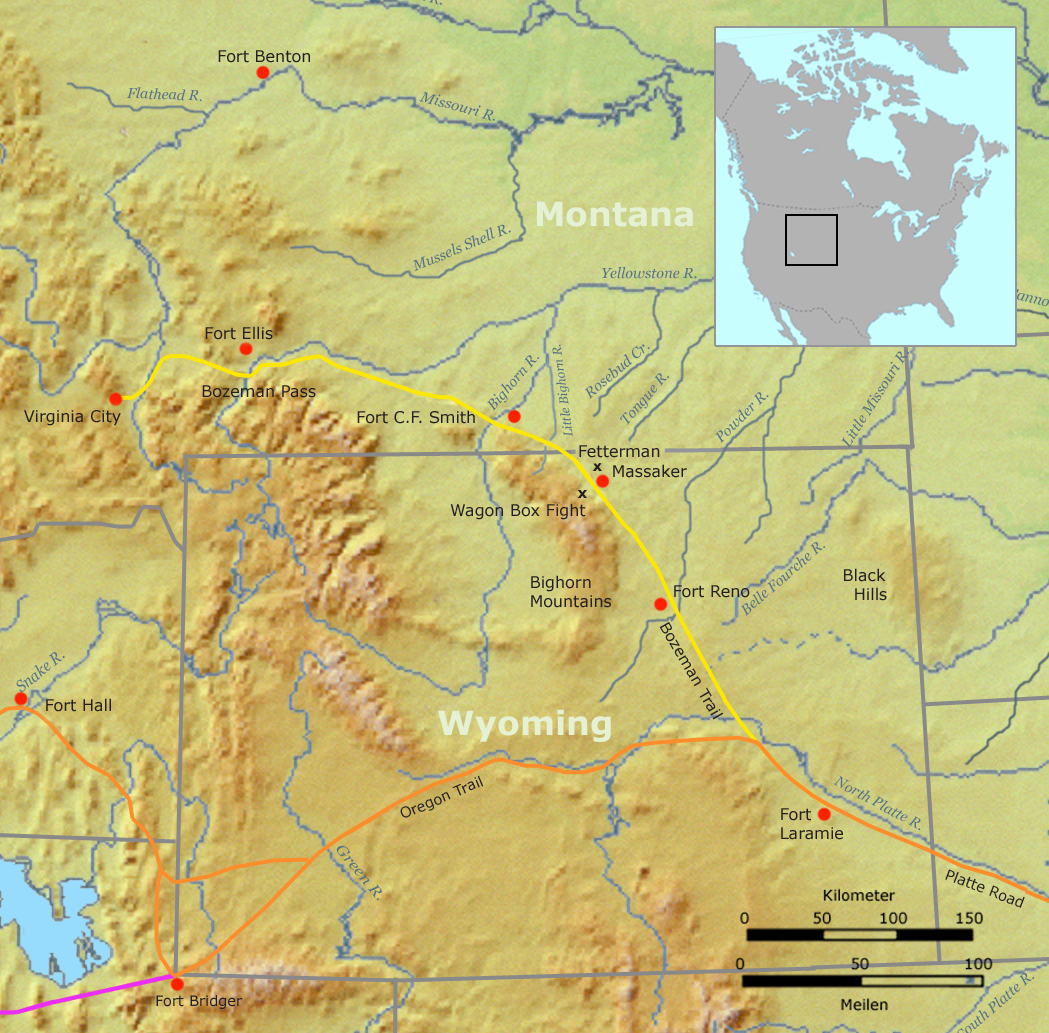
Map showing the Bozeman Trail

On March 4, 1864, Vaughn and six others left Youngstown for the gold fields of the Idaho Territory. They traveled by horse-drawn wagon to Council Bluffs, Iowa (which took 25 days), crossed the Mississippi River by ferryboat, and arrived in Omaha, Nebraska. They joined a large train of 65 wagons taking the Oregon Trail to points west. They followed the trail along the North Platte River until they reached the junction with the Bozeman Trail (about 50 miles (80 km) northeast of Fort Laramie in Wyoming). John Bozeman, who had blazed the Bozeman Trail only the year before, led the Vaughn party and 19 other wagons out along the trail. The party was joined by other wagons coming in from Fort Laramie, and soon numbered more than 100 wagons.

The wagon train arrived in Alder Gulch (near Virginia City, Madison County, Montana) on July 13, 1864. They were startled to learn they were not in the Idaho Territory but rather in the Montana Territory, which Congress had created on May 26, 1864, out of part of the Idaho Territory. His goal was to get rich mining for gold in Montana. He spent July and August working for the company of Boon & Vivian mining gold as a day laborer. In September 1864, he and four other men headed east (encountering petrified wood in the Tom Miner Basin in what is now Park County), but found no gold deposits. They returned to Alder Gulch having spent 29 days in the wilderness.

In December 1864, Vaughn and three others took two mules and followed the Madison River to the Missouri River and thence to Last Chance Gulch, in what is now the city of Helena, Montana. In the gulch, he dug drainage ditches (and found a mastodon tooth). He moved to nearby Nelson Gulch, and was present when a gigantic gold nugget worth $2,000 was discovered on the Maxwell & Rollins Co. claim on July 3, 1865. He stayed in Nelson Gulch for three years, working first as a miner and then opening a meat market. His goal still was to get rich mining, but he had no luck doing so.

== The Vaughn Ranch ==
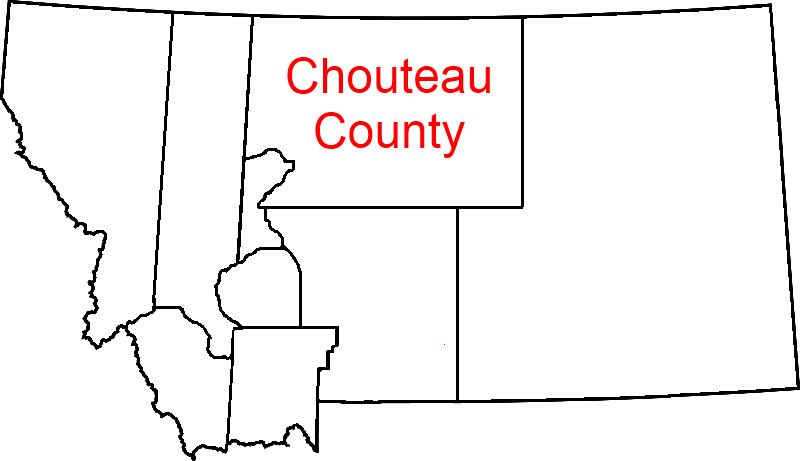
Chouteau County as it existed in 1869

While living in Nelson Gulch, Vaughn became convinced that Montana was excellent ranching and farming country. In the fall of 1869, he traveled into Chouteau County, Montana, which at the time covered nearly a sixth of the state. About 9 miles (14 km) upstream from where the Sun River joined the Missouri River, he decided to homestead. He returned to Helena and filed paperwork to claim the land, and learned he was the first individual to formally file for a homestead in Chouteau County.

Over the next few years, numerous homesteads and small settlements were established along the Sun River. A town, originally named Sun River Crossing, grew up near "The Leavings" (where the road left the Sun River valley), and Vaughn and his neighbors constructed an irrigation ditch that allowed them to grow barley, oats, potatoes, and wheat. Although Vaughn started out farming, he quickly turned to ranching. He imported a large number of pure-bred cattle and horses, and his horses were some of the best in the state.

Vaughn helped found the city of Great Falls in 1883. Businessman Paris Gibson visited the Great Falls of the Missouri River in 1880 and was deeply impressed by the possibilities for building a major industrial city near the falls with power provided by hydroelectricity. He returned in 1883 with Vaughn and several surveyors, and platted a permanent settlement on the south side of the river. The city's first citizen, Silas Beachley, arrived later that year. With investments from railroad owner James J. Hill and Helena businessman Charles Arthur Broadwater, houses, a store, and a flour mill were established in 1884. The town plat was filed on September 30, 1884. By 1887 the town had 1,200 citizens, and in October of that year the St. Paul, Minneapolis & Manitoba Railway (later part of the Great Northern Railway) arrived in the city. Great Falls was incorporated on November 28, 1888.

== Marriages ==
On August 25, 1886, 50-year-old Robert Vaughn married 31-year-old Elizabeth Donahue of Toronto, Ontario, Canada. She gave birth to a daughter, Arvonia Elizabeth Vaughn, on January 1, 1888. Elizabeth died of complications from childbirth twelve days later. When she grew up, Arvonia Vaughn married civil engineer Hugh Max Sprague, a native of Fullerville, New York, on October 4, 1911. The couple had four children, one of whom died in infancy.

On January 17, 1893, Vaughn married Ella de Vee, a native of Indiana, but the couple soon divorced.

== Great Falls ==
Robert Vaughn was devastated by his young wife's death. He determined to sell his ranch and move into Great Falls. In 1889, he began construction of two of the earliest buildings to be constructed in the city. The first was the Arvon Block (named for his daughter), a 40-room hotel with a modern and sophisticated horse stable, located at 114-116 First Avenue South. The other was the Vaughn Block, the city's first apartment building, located at the corner of Central Avenue and Third Street South. Both were completed in 1890. Vaughn and his daughter moved into rooms at the Vaughn Block. Vaughn sold his ranch in 1890 to "Captain" Thomas Couch, a Cornish immigrant and expert miner who managed the Boston and Montana Consolidated Copper and Silver Mining Company.

A close friend of Paris Gibson, Vaughn quickly became one of the most prominent businessmen in Great Falls. He speculated in real estate, built warehouses and other commercial buildings, and financed mining operations throughout the state. He became a member of the Benevolent and Protective Order of Elks and the Freemasons, and an active participant in the Society of Montana Pioneers (an organization established in 1884 whose members had to have arrived in Montana prior to December 1, 1868). Widely known in the city as a kind and generous man, Vaughn became known as "Uncle Bob" to the people of Great Falls.

In 1890, the North Western Coal and Navigation Company constructed the Great Falls & Canada Railway, a narrow-gauge railway (3-foot (0.91 m)) which ran from Sweet Grass, Montana (at the Canada–U.S. border) to a terminus adjacent to the Vaughn ranch. Designed to carry coal to Lethbridge, Alberta, the railroad was dubbed the "Turkey Trail". The railroad led to settlement around the terminus. In 1910, Couch platted a town there, named Vaughn after Robert Vaughn.

== Death ==
In his last years, Vaughn suffered from severe osteoarthritis. He needed a cane, and later a crutch, to walk. He moved in with his daughter and son-in-law as his health worsened, and died at their home on March 23, 1918, aged 81. Methodist preacher William "Brother Van" Van Orsdel officiated at his funeral. Large throngs of people came to the service. "Throughout all his eventful life ... he did things worthwhile in his home life, in his Christian life, in the lodges, and in the community. We are all bereft", Van Orsdel told the crowd. Robert Vaughn was buried beneath a large obelisk in Highland Cemetery (now Old Highland Cemetery) near Great Falls, as are his close family members.

== Then and Now ==
In 1900, Robert Vaughn published a book titled Then and Now, or, Thirty-Six Years in the Rockies: Personal Reminiscences of Some of the First Pioneers of the State of Montana: Indians and Indian Wars: The Past and Present of the Rocky Mountain Country: 1864-1900. Vaughn conceived of the book as a collection of the letters he had written to his daughter, Arvonia. (The first was written seven weeks after her birth.)

Over time, however, Vaughn expanded his vision of the book to include pieces written by other pioneers of the Old West (some republished from other sources, but many written specifically for Vaughn's book). Vaughn also changed the audience for whom the book was written, expanding it to include the general public. Vaughn's good friend, the nationally famous "cowboy artist" Charles Marion Russell, illustrated the book. It was only the second book illustrated by Russell.

Historian Dave Walter said that Then and Now "affords a rare glimpse into the early white settlement of Montana" and declared it "...a remarkable contribution to 'the Montana story'".

Vaughn, who lived close to Russell, collected about 25 of Russell's paintings during his lifetime. Among the more notable of these are There May Be Danger Ahead (1893), Trouble on the Horizon (1893), Plunder on the Horizon (1894), Indians Hunting Buffalo (1894), Attack on the Mule Train (1894), and The Ambush (1896). Both The Ambush and another important Russell work, Big Nose George and the Road Agents (1895), are based on a story about stagecoach robbers told by Vaughn to Russell in a letter.

== Bibliography ==
- Aarstad, Rich; Arguimbau, Ellen; Baumler, Ellen; Porsild, Charlene L.; and Shovers, Brian. Montana Place Names From Alzada to Zortman. Helena, MT: Montana Historical Society Press 2009. ISBN 9780975919613.
- Cooper, Walter; Newby, Rick; and Peterson, Larry Len. A Most Desperate Situation: Frontier Adventures of a Young Scout, 1858-1864. Helena, MT: TwoDot Press, 2000, ISBN 9781560448914.
- Dippie, Brian W. Remington & Russell: The Sid Richardson Collection. Austin, TX: University of Texas Press, 1994, ISBN 9780292715691.
- Federal Writers' Project. Montana: A State Guide Book. Washington, D.C.: Federal Works Agency, Work Projects Administration, 1939.
- "Great Falls, Montana." In Encyclopedia of the Great Plains. David J. Wishart, ed. Lincoln, NE: University of Nebraska Press, 2004, ISBN 9780803247871.
- Malone, Michael P. James J. Hill: Empire Builder of the Northwest. Reprint ed. Stillwater, OK: University of Oklahoma Press, 1996.
- Poor, Henry Varnum. Manual of the Railroads of the United States NY: H.V. & H.W. Poor, 1894.
- Taliaferro, John. Charles M. Russell: The Life and Legend of America's Cowboy Artist. Norman, OK: University of Oklahoma Press, 2003, ISBN 9780806134956.
- Vaughn, Robert. Then and Now, or, Thirty-Six Years in the Rockies: Personal Reminiscences of Some of the First Pioneers of the State of Montana: Indians and Indian Wars: The Past and Present of the Rocky Mountain Country: 1864-1900. Minneapolis, MN: Tribune Printing Co., 1900.
- Walter, Dave. "Introduction." In Then and Now, or, Thirty-Six Years in the Rockies: Personal Reminiscences of Some of the First Pioneers of the State of Montana. By Robert Vaughn. Reprint ed. Nabu Press, 2012, ISBN 9781286590652.
