= Sluice Boxes State Park =

State park in Montana, United States

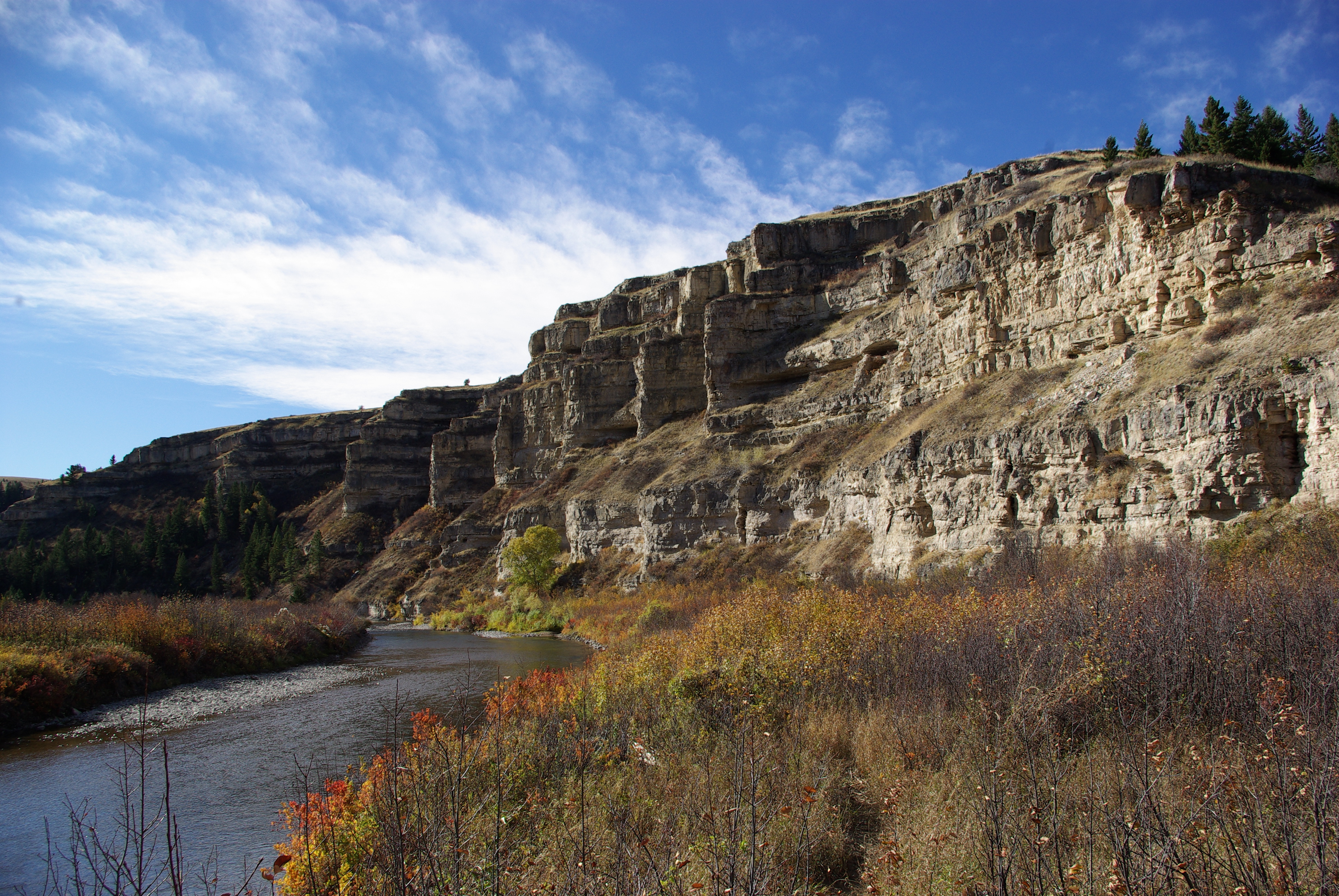
- Cliffs of the Belt Creek canyon

- Location within Montana
- Location: Cascade County, Montana, United States
- Nearest town: Belt, Montana
- Coordinates: 47°11′32″N 110°56′29″W
- Area: 1,454 acres (5.88 km^{2})
- Elevation: 4,035 ft (1,230 m)
- Designation: Montana state park
- Established: 1974
- Visitors: 31,498 (in 2023)
- Administrator: Montana Fish, Wildlife & Parks
- Website: Sluice Boxes State Park

Sluice Boxes State Park is a public recreation area in the Little Belt Mountains of Montana, United States, located twelve miles (19 km) south of Belt on the Kings Hill Scenic Byway. The state park is highlighted by large cliffs and ledges where the northernmost eight miles of the Belt Creek canyon winds out of the Little Belt Mountains. Remains of the area's mining and railroading days are found throughout the canyon. The park offers fishing, hiking, floating, picnicking, and backcountry camping.
