= Belt Creek =

Belt Creek may refer to:

- Belt Creek (Ontario) in Ontario, Canada.
- Belt Creek (Montana), a tributary of the Missouri River in Montana in the United States.
