= Belt Creek (Montana) =

River in Montana, United States of America

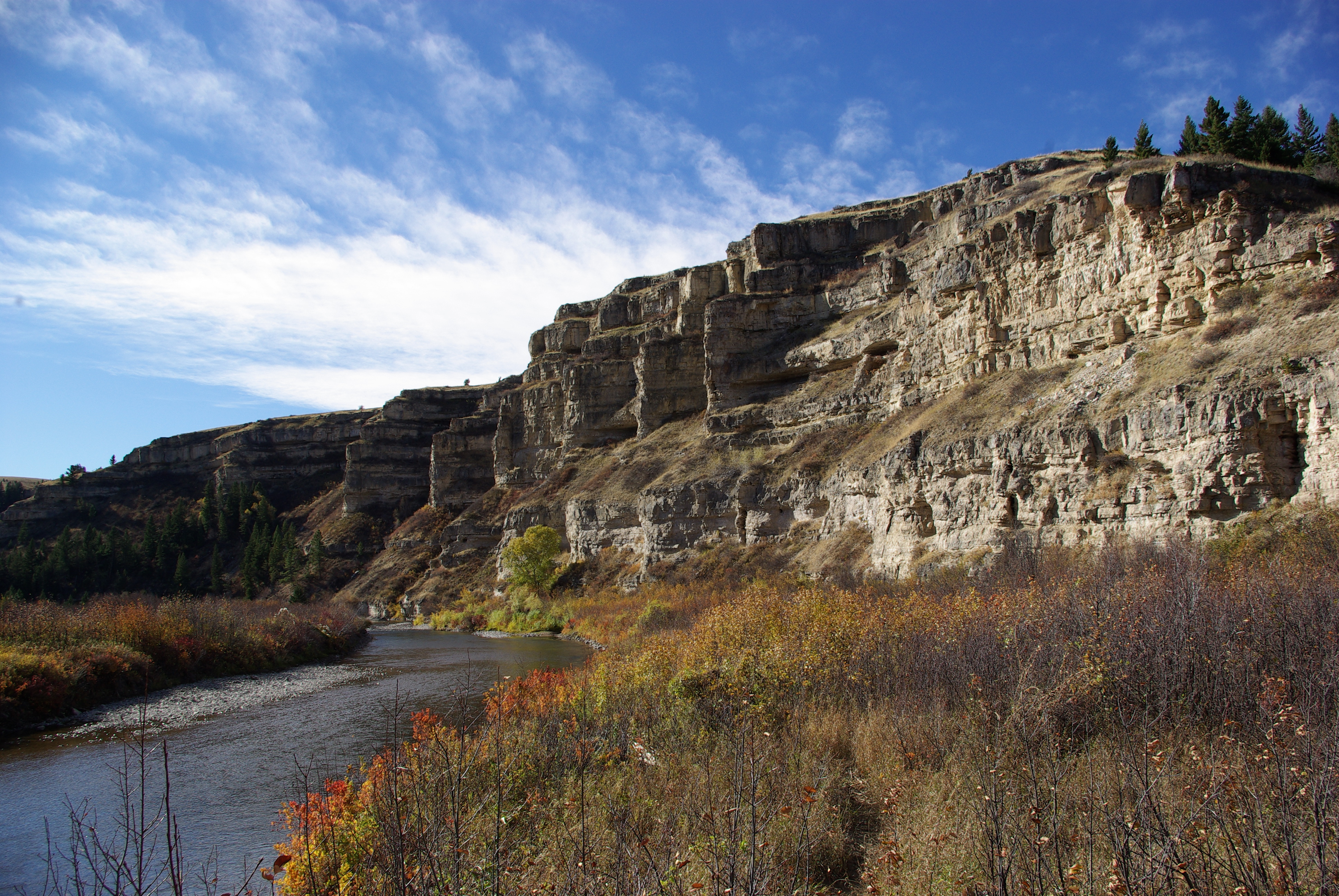
- Belt Creek flowing below the cliffs of Sluice Boxes State Park

- Mouth of Belt Creek in Montana
- Native name: kɔyɔ́ɔteihíniicááh (Gros Ventre)

Location
- Country: Cascade and Chouteau County, Montana

Physical characteristics
- Source
  - coordinates: 46°50′45″N 110°40′09″W
- Mouth
  - coordinates: 47°35′53″N 111°02′55″W
  - elevation: 2,792 feet (851 m)
- Discharge
  - location: near Portage
  - average: 249 cu ft/s (7.1 m^{3}/s)

Basin features
- River system: Missouri River

Belt Creek (Gros Ventre: kɔyɔ́ɔteihíniicááh, lit. 'belt river') is a tributary, approximately 80 mi (129 km) long, of the Missouri River in western Montana in the United States.

It originates in the Lewis and Clark National Forest north of Big Baldy Mountain, in the Little Belt Mountains in western Judith Basin County. It flows northwest through mountainous canyons (Limestone Canyon) past Monarch, through Sluice Boxes State Park, and flows through Armington and Belt. It finally joins the Missouri approximately 15 mi (25 km) northwest of Great Falls of the Missouri and 2 miles (3 km) downstream of Morony Dam.

It is named for the Little Belt Mountains, which it flows through.

Willow, cottonwood, chokecherry, and wild roses grow in part of the canyon stretch and in a large band in the foothill zone. Brook, Brown, and Rainbow Trout have been introduced to the creek. Native fish include several minnows, mooneye, perch, sculpin, 4 types of suckers, and 2 types of trout.

== See also ==
- List of rivers of Montana
- Montana Stream Access Law
