= First Methodist Church (Moscow, Idaho) =

- U.S. National Register of Historic Places
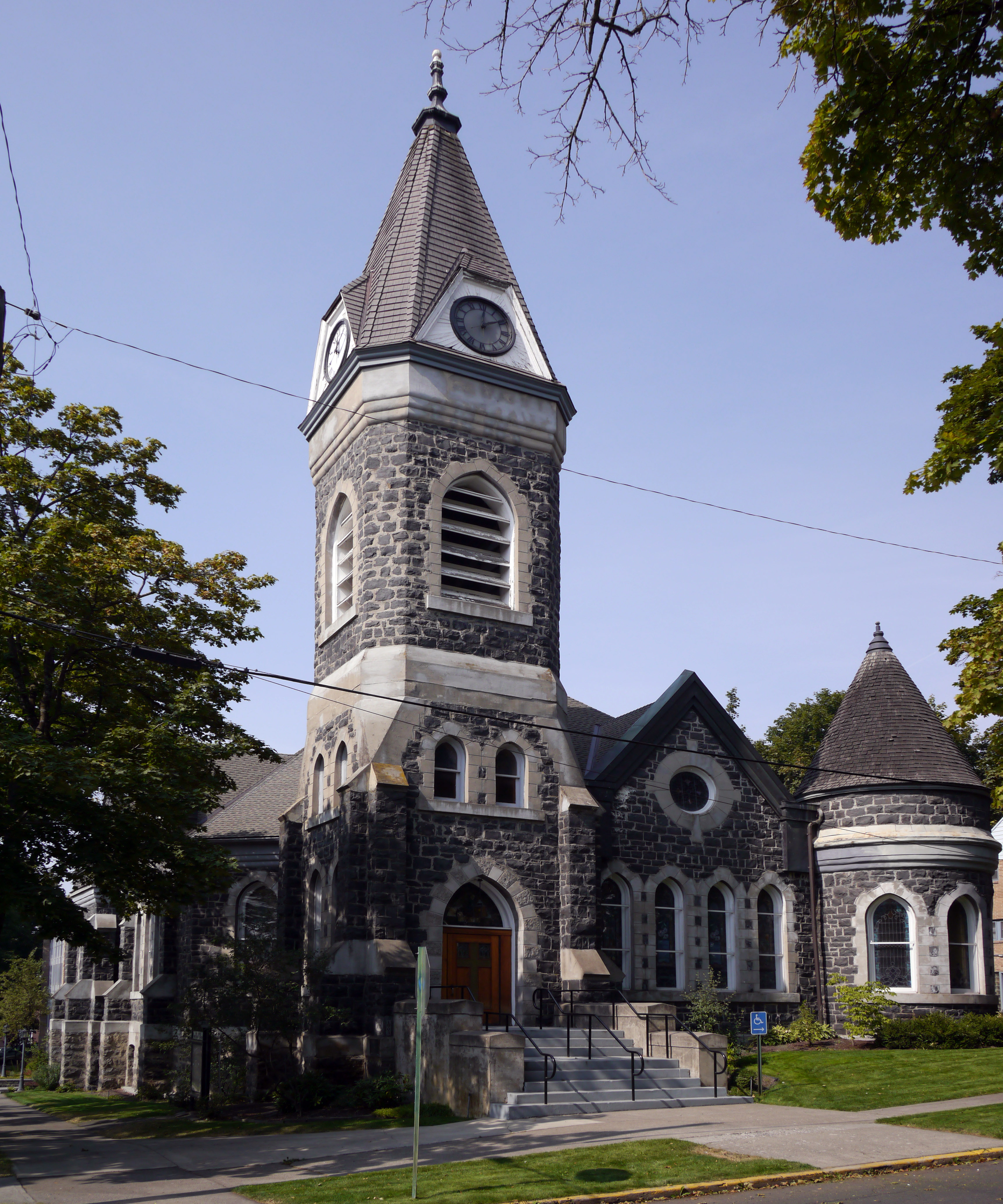
- The church in 2012

- Location within Idaho Location within the United States
- Location: 322 East 3rd Street, Moscow, Idaho
- Coordinates: 46°43′57″N 116°59′48″W
- Area: less than one acre
- Built: 1904
- Architect: H. N. Black
- Architectural style: Gothic, Romanesque
- NRHP reference No.: 78001073
- Added to NRHP: October 5, 1978

The First Methodist Church is a historic building in Moscow, Idaho. It was built in 1904. The first minister was Reverend William Tell Euster, who authored The Philosophy of Church Building.

The building was designed by architect H. N. Black in the Gothic Revival and Romanesque Revival styles. It has been listed on the National Register of Historic Places since October 5, 1978.
