= Margaret Block =

- U.S. National Register of Historic Places
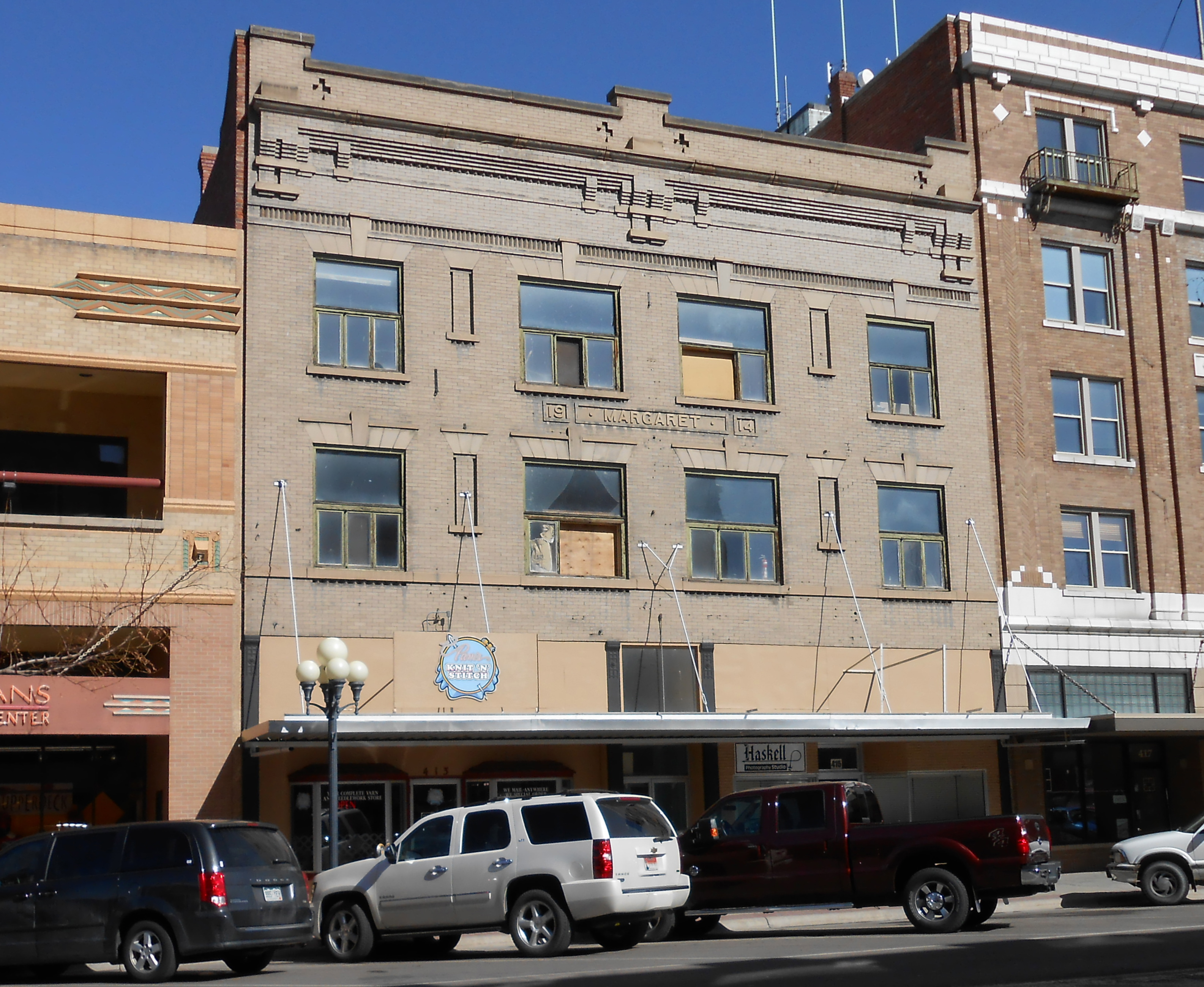
- The building in 2013

- Location within Montana Location within the United States
- Location: 413-415 Central Avenue, Great Falls, Montana
- Coordinates: 47°30′20″N 111°17′57″W
- Area: less than one acre
- Built: 1914
- Architect: Hiram N. Black
- Architectural style: Prairie School
- NRHP reference No.: 84002447
- Added to NRHP: August 2, 1984

Margaret Block is a historic three-story building in Great Falls, Montana. It was designed in the Prairie School style by architect Hiram N. Black, and built in 1914 by A. W. Kingsbury. The first floor was used for retail, including a jewelry store, and the second and third floors were a hotel. It has been listed on the National Register of Historic Places since August 2, 1984.
