= Matt Maki =

Finland-born American architect

Matt Maki was a Finland-born carpenter/builder and self-styled architect in Montana. He and others brought fine Finnish craftwork into use in construction in the new world, in a wild, forested area in Cascade County, Montana. Among the Finnish immigrants, Maki "was probably the greatest influence and source of building knowledge in the area." A good deal about his craftsmanship but few facts about his life are known.

A number of Maki's works are listed on the U.S. National Register of Historic Places.

Works include:

- Crocker-Jarvi Homestead, built 1893, Address Restricted, Belt, MT (Maki, Matt; Maki, Emil), NRHP-listed
- Heikkila-Mattila Homestead, Address Restricted, Belt, MT (Maki, Matt), NRHP-listed
- Kraftenberg Homestead, Address Restricted, Belt, MT (Maki, Matt), NRHP-listed
- Lewis-Nevala Homestead, Address Restricted, Belt, MT (Maki, Matt), NRHP-listed

== See also ==
- Stone Homestead, also Address Restricted, Belt, MT, NRHP-listed as part of Korpivaara MPS
