= Lee M. Ford House =

Historic house in Montana, United States

- U.S. National Register of Historic Places
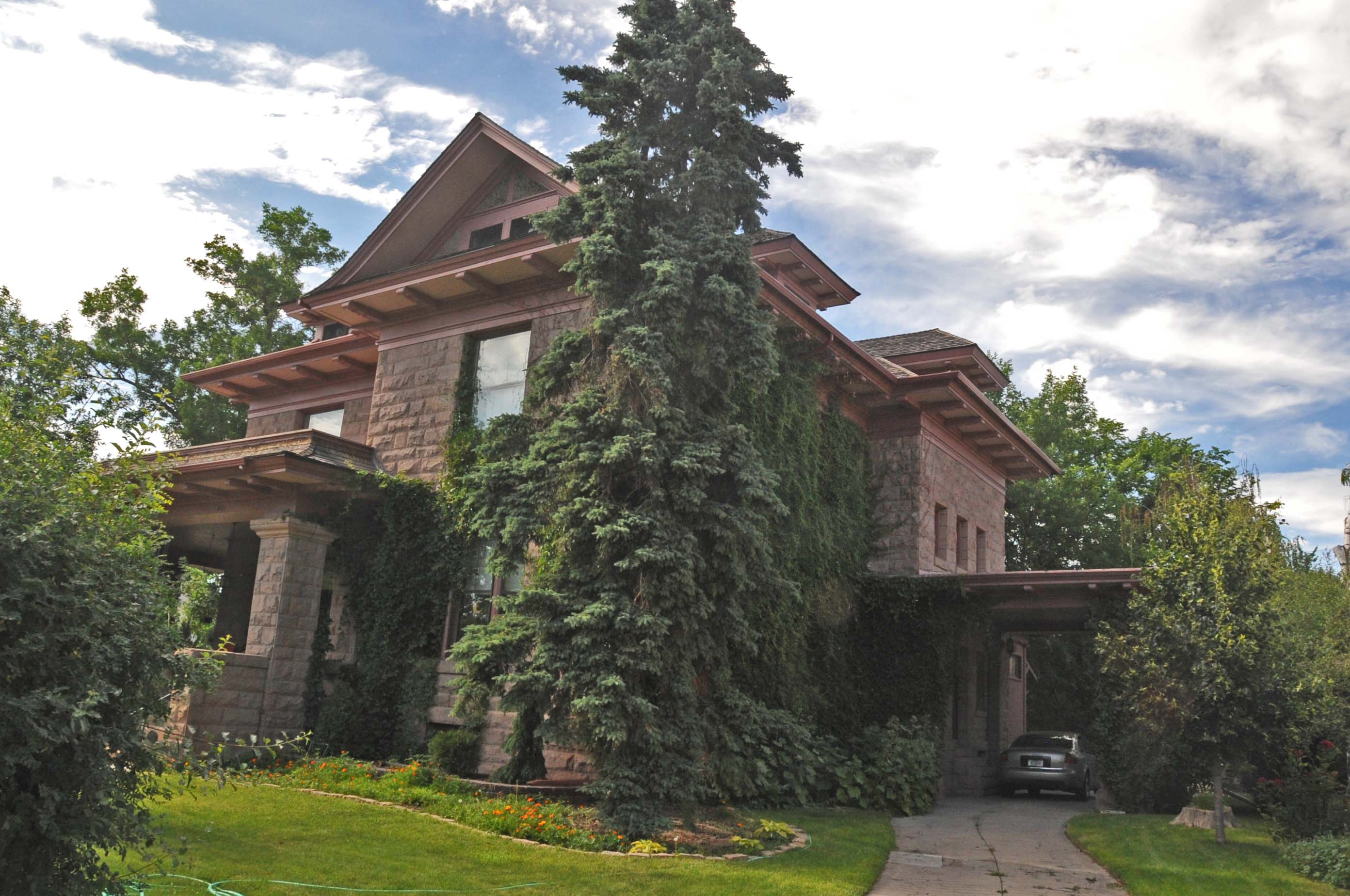
- The house in 2013

- Location within Montana Location within the United States
- Location: 401 4th Avenue North, Great Falls, Montana
- Coordinates: 47°30′37″N 111°18′00″W
- Area: less than one acre
- Built: 1908
- Built by: C. O. Jarl
- Architect: H. N. Black
- Architectural style: Prairie School, American Craftsman
- NRHP reference No.: 90001215
- Added to NRHP: August 10, 1990

The Lee M. Ford House is a historic house in Great Falls, Montana. It was designed in the Prairie School and American Craftsman styles by architect H. N. Black, and built by C. O. Jarl in 1908. Ford was the son of Robert S. Ford, a pioneer cattleman, and his father built it for him. Ford and architect Black were related. The house has been listed on the National Register of Historic Places since August 10, 1990.
