= Great Falls Portage =

- U.S. National Register of Historic Places
- U.S. National Historic Landmark District
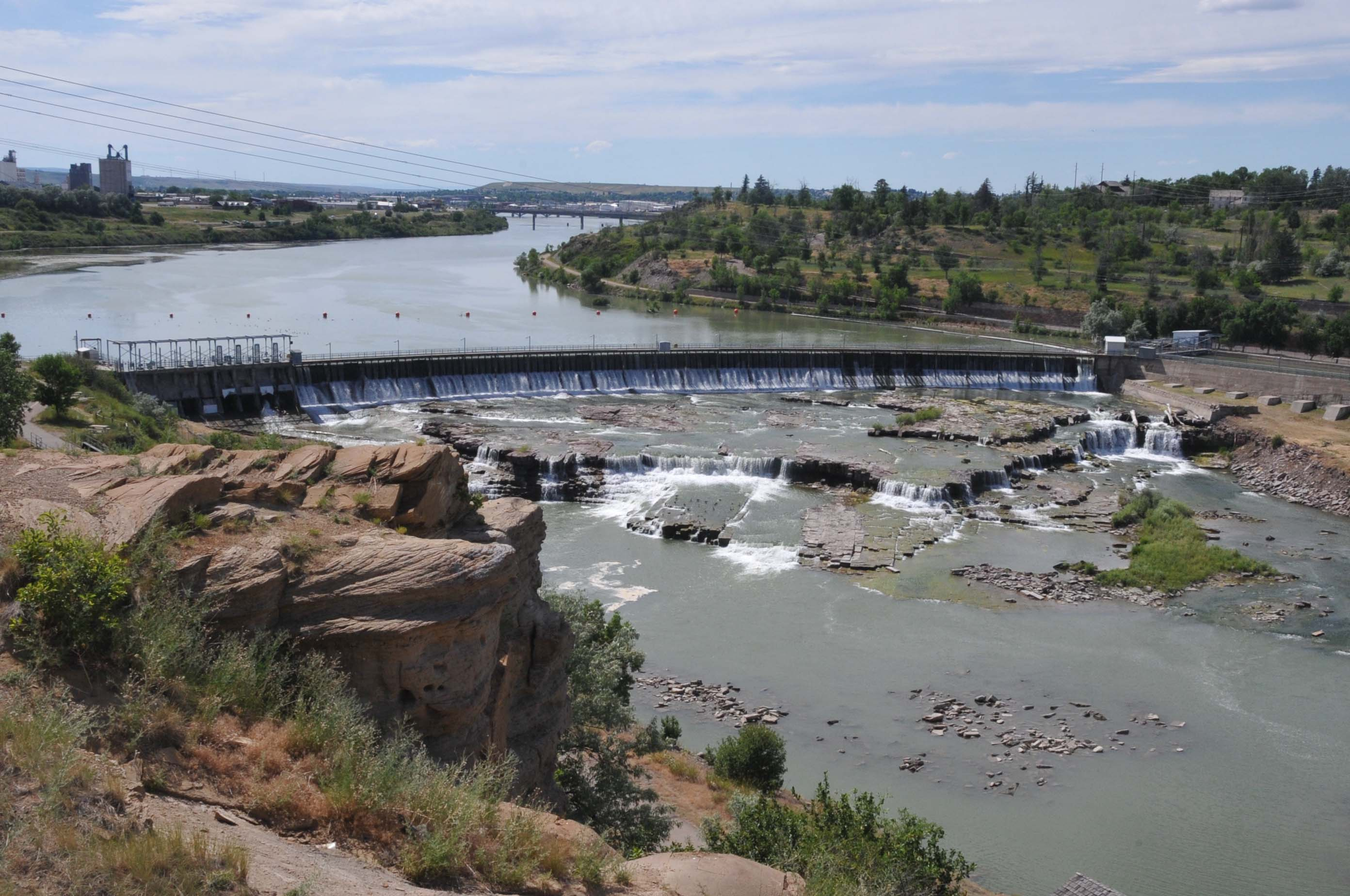
- One of the (now dammed) falls bypassed by the portage

- Location within Montana Location within the United States
- Nearest city: Great Falls, Montana
- Coordinates: 47°31′52″N 111°9′5″W
- Area: 7,700 acres (3,100 ha)
- Built: 1805
- NRHP reference No.: 66000429

Significant dates
- Added to NRHP: October 15, 1966
- Designated NHLD: May 23, 1966

The Great Falls Portage is the route taken by the Lewis and Clark Expedition in 1805 to portage around the Great Falls of the Missouri River during the outbound portion of the expedition. The 18-mile (29 km) portage took 31 days. Two portions of the route, which have largely escaped development, are part of a National Historic Landmark District, designated in 1966 to commemorate this achievement. The River's Edge Trail forms a modern footpath along the falls.

== History ==
The 1804–1806 Lewis and Clark Expedition was the first major incursion of English-speaking white men into the northwestern American plains. Ascending the Missouri River, the party reached the Great Falls area on June 13, 1805. Having been forewarned of the falls' existence by the Hidatsa with whom they had overwintered, an advance team led by Meriwether Lewis scouted the extent of the falls, which then consisted of a series of cascades extending beyond what is now the city of Great Falls. Many of these have since been dammed to produce hydroelectric power, and some are hemmed in by the city.

The route selected by Clark began with an ascent of over 1 mile (1.6 km) up what is now called Belt Creek, about 1 mile below present-day Morony Dam. From there, the expedition boats were carried overland on crude wagons constructed by the team overland to a site near the White Bear Islands, south of the modern city. The expedition's largest boat, a pirogue, was left at Belt Creek. The team celebrated Independence Day at the upper camp, and departed upstream on July 15, having constructed two additional canoes to compensate for the loss of the boat.

== Landmarked areas ==
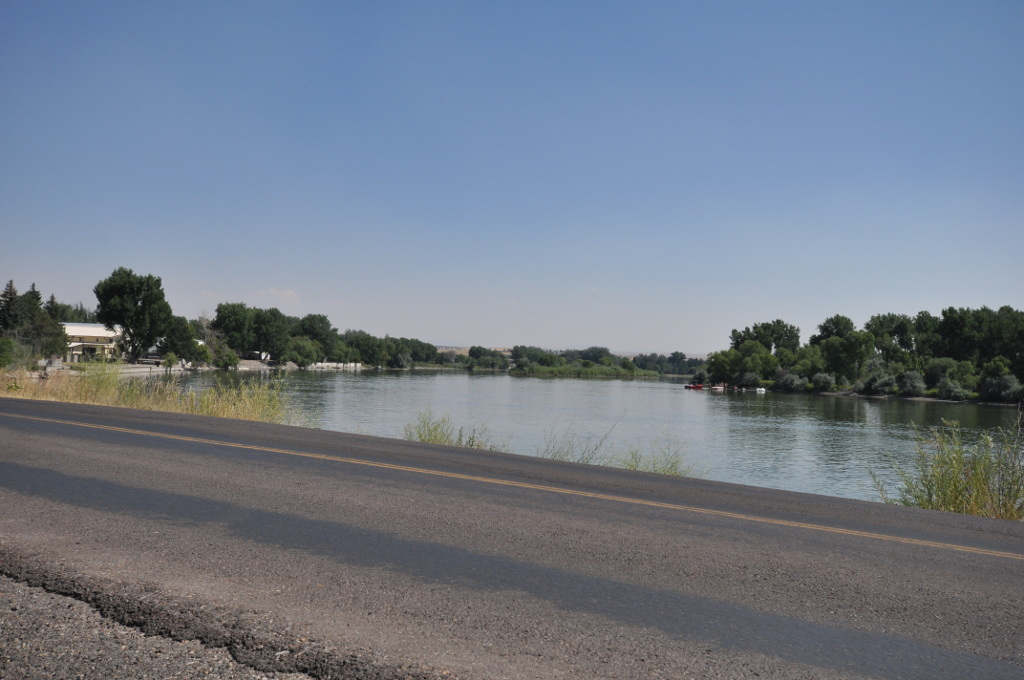
White Bear Islands area

Two separate portions of the expedition portage route form part of the National Historic Landmark District designated in 1966. At the lower end of the portage, the area on the east bank of the river where the party made camp (approximately 47°36′15.3″N 111°02′43.7″W) is included, as is the portage route up Belt Creek, continuing for about 8 miles (13 km) across what are now mainly agricultural fields. Also included in this section is Sulphur Spring, located above the west bank of the river opposite the mouth of Belt Creek. Water from this source, reputed to have curative powers, was used to treat Sacagawea, who had fallen seriously ill at the camp. This entire area is privately owned, and is difficult to access by land.

The other element of the portage that is landmarked is the last 2.5 miles (4.0 km) of the route, extending from Mount Olivet Cemetery to the White Bear Islands area (approximately 47°27′34.7″N 111°17′57.4″W). At the time of the expedition there were three White Bear Islands; one has since become attached to the western shore by silting action, and the actual camp site was probably some way east of the current eastern bank. The land in this area is also privately owned but is crossed by public roads.

In May 2008 the National Trust for Historic Preservation listed the site on their list of America's Most Endangered Places due to a proposed coal-fired power plant in the vicinity.

== See also ==
- National Register of Historic Places listings in Cascade County, Montana
- List of National Historic Landmarks in Montana
