= Boston and Montana Consolidated Copper and Silver Mining Company =

US mining, smelting, and refining company

- Type: Public company
- Industry: Mining, smelting, refining
- Founded: 1887
- Defunct: 1901
- Successor: Amalgamated Copper Company
- Headquarters: Butte, Montana
- Area served: United States

The Boston and Montana Consolidated Copper and Silver Mining Company (the "Boston and Montana" or "B&M") was a mining, smelting, and refining company which operated primarily in the state of Montana in the United States. It was established in 1887 and merged with the Amalgamated Copper Company in 1901. The Amalgamated Copper Company changed its name to Anaconda Copper in 1910 and became one of America's largest corporations. Historian Michael P. Malone has written, "Well financed and well managed, the Boston and Montana came to rank among the world's greatest copper companies."

== Corporate history ==
Adolph and Leonard Lewisohn were German Jews whose father had established in 1858 an American subsidiary, Lewisohn Brothers, which bought and sold bristles, feathers, hair, metals, and wood. In 1867, Adolph and Leonard emigrated to the United States and took over the company, focusing their attention on the trading of copper, lead, and zinc. In 1879, the brothers were invited to purchase some mines in Arizona, Montana, and Tennessee. With $75,000, they organized the Montana Copper Company, the Tennessee Copper and Chemical Company, and the Miami Copper Company (in Arizona). In 1887, Adolph and Leonard bought Lewisohn Brothers from their father and turned it into an independent company.

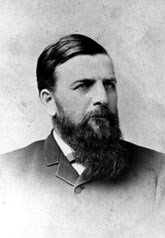
C. X. Larrabee, who co-founded the Boston and Montana smelting company in the 1890s

The Boston and Montana was organized on July 22, 1887, by the merger of Lewisohn Brothers, the Montana Copper Company, and the mine holdings of C. X. Larrabee (owner of the highly productive and famous Larrabee and Mountain View mines). It quickly became the second-largest company in Montana (only the Anaconda Copper Company in Butte was larger). It owned mines in Arizona, Michigan, Montana, and Tennessee. For many years, it was managed by "Captain" Thomas Couch, a Cornish immigrant and expert miner.

In Montana, the B&M relied heavily on copper mined from the Leonard and the Colusa mines, near Butte. The company owned a small smelter in Meaderville, a small town just east of Butte (now consumed by the Berkeley Pit mine). Other productive mines (the Badger State, Comanche, Liquidator, Mountain View, Pennsylvania, Wandering Jew, and West Colusa) now added their ores to the stream needing smelting and refining. The Meaderville smelter was too small, and any smelter would need cheap power and much water. Leonard Lewisohn considered both Helena and Great Falls for his new smelter.

The balance was tipped in favor of Great Falls due to several factors. First was the existence of a railroad to Great Falls. James Jerome Hill, primary stockholder and president of the Great Northern Railway had established a subsidiary, the Montana Central Railway, on January 25, 1886. Few railroads served Montana at that time. But Butte was a booming mining town that needed to get its metals to market, gold and silver had been discovered near Helena, and coal companies in Canada were eager to get their fuel to Montana's smelters. Hill's close friend and business associate, Paris Gibson, had founded the town of Great Falls on the Great Falls of the Missouri River in 1883, and was promoting it as a site for the development of cheap hydroelectricity and heavy industry. Hill was building the Great Northern across the northern tier of Montana, and it made sense to build a north-south railroad through central Montana to connect Great Falls with Helena and Butte. Surveyors and engineers had begun grading a route between Helena and Great Falls in the winter of 1885–1886 (even before the company had been incorporated), and by the end of 1886 had surveyed a route from Helena to Butte. Construction on the Great Northern's line westward began in late 1886, and on October 16, 1887, the link between Devils Lake, North Dakota; Fort Assinniboine (near the present-day city of Havre); and Great Falls was complete. Service to Helena began in November 1887, and Butte followed on November 10, 1888.

The second reason was Hill's own investment in the city of Great Falls. Hill organized the Great Falls Water Power & Townsite Company in 1887, with the goal of developing the town of Great Falls; providing it with power, sewage, and water; and attracting commerce and industry to the city. To attract industry to the new city, he offered low rates on the Montana Central Railway. In case cheap power, plenty of water, and low shipping rates were not enough of an inducement, Hill also gave Leonard Lewisohn 1,500 shares in the Great Falls Water Power & Townsite Company.

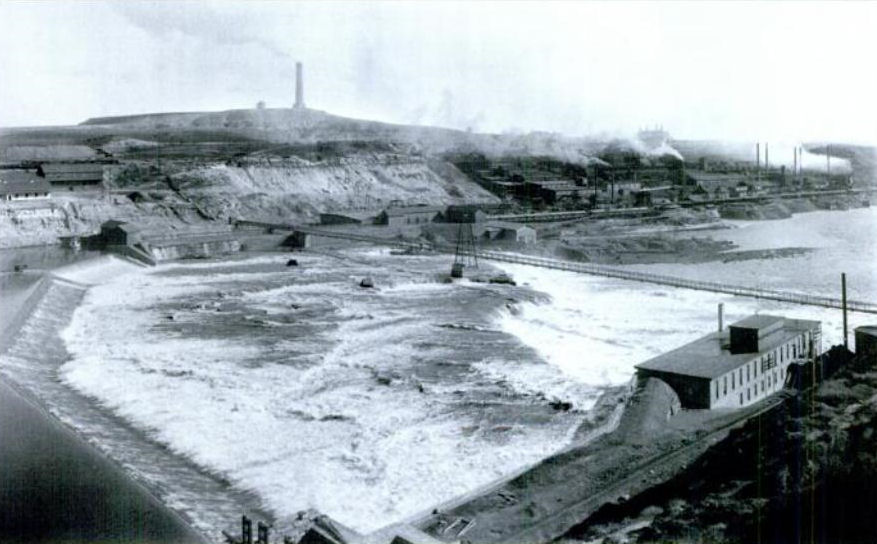
The Boston and Montana Smelter in Great Falls, Montana, circa 1907. Black Eagle Dam is to the left.

On September 12, 1889, the Boston and Montana signed an agreement with Great Falls Water Power & Townsite Company in which the power company agreed to build a dam that would supply the mining firm with at least 1,000 horsepower (or 0.75 MW) of power by September 1, 1890, and 5,000 horsepower (or 3.73 MW) of power by January 1, 1891. In exchange, Boston and Montana agreed to build a $300,000 copper smelter near the dam. Black Eagle Dam began generating electricity in December 1890. Water was permitted to flow over the crest of the dam on January 6, 1891, and the dam was considered complete on March 15, 1891.

Ground was broken on the smelter in the spring of 1890. It was located on a bluff overlooking Black Eagle Dam next to the hamlet of Black Eagle, Montana. The concentrator opened in March 1891; Brückner cylinders and reverberatory furnaces in April 1892; converters in August 1892; refining furnaces in January 1893; an electrolytic refinery in February 1893; and blast furnaces in April 1893. The cost of the original plant was $2 million, and by 1892 more than 1,000 workers were employed at the smelter.

Along with Anaconda Copper, the Butte and Boston Consolidated Mining Company, and the Montana Ore Purchasing Company, the Boston and Montana was the most powerful mining and refining concern in Montana in the early 1890s. In 1890, 50 percent of all copper mined in the U.S. came from Montana. In 1897, Anaconda Copper supplied 341,500,000 pounds (154,900,000 kg) of copper; Calumet and Hecla (in Michigan) supplied 88,400,000 pounds (40,100,000 kg) of copper; and the Boston and Montana 60,000,000 pounds (27,000,000 kg).

In 1899, Henry Huttleston Rogers, a business associate of John D. Rockefeller, proposed the creation of a giant copper company through the consolidation of smaller firms. F. Augustus Heinze, owner of Montana Ore, opposed these efforts. After losing several battles in Montana state courts, Rogers and his business associates incorporated in the state of New York and attempted to obtain control of several Montana copper mining and smelting companies. Their goal was to establish diversity of jurisdiction so that any future lawsuits would be heard by federal courts (which Rogers believed would be less considerate of Heinze's interests). Heinze's associates bought stock in the New York company, and then initiated a lawsuit (financed by Heinze) in which they claimed that the reincorporation had been done without shareholder consent. Rogers lost the suit, and was forced to re-reincorporate (a process which took several years). Rogers purchased Anaconda Copper in 1899, then established a new holding company (the Amalgamated Copper Company) to control Anaconda and the other firms Rogers coveted. By November 1900, Amalgamated had purchased the Colorado Smelter and Mining Company and the Washoe Copper Company, and had a controlling interest in the stock of the Parrott Silver and Copper Mining Company. The following year, Rogers obtained a majority stockholder position in the Boston and Montana and the Butte and Montana companies.

== Post-consolidation ==
In 1903, the Amalgamated shut down its smelting operations in an attempt to force Heinze to shut down his mines. This would turn Heinze's miners, who idolized their young chief executive officer, against him. Unfortunately, Heinze kept his mining operations open. In 1904, he disobeyed a federal injunction and began mining an underground area whose ownership was in dispute. Heinze was fined $20,000, and held in contempt of court. John D. Ryan, president of the Daly Bank and Trust Co. in Butte and former president of the Anaconda Company, convinced Heinze to sell out to Amalgamated. Heinze did so in 1906, accepting $10.5 million in compensation and agreeing to end more than 110 lawsuits which had tied up $70 to $100 million worth of Amalgamated property.

The B&M's site in Great Falls later became known for a record-setting smokestack. On April 7, 1908, construction began on the "Big Stack," a chimney for dispersal of fumes 506 feet (154 m) high, with an interior measurement of 78.5 feet (23.9 m) in diameter at the base and 50 feet (15 m) in diameter at the top. Built by the Alphonse Custodis Construction Co. of New York, it was completed on October 23, 1908, and was the tallest chimney in the world when finished.

The former Boston and Montana smelter in Great Falls closed in 1980.

In 2011, the old B&M smelter was listed by the United States Environmental Protection Agency (EPA) as a Superfund hazardous and toxic waste site. The EPA also said it would begin sampling for the riverbed above and below Black Eagle Dam, as well as residential areas in the town of Black Eagle, for heavy metals contamination. Historic records show that plant wastes were routinely dumped into the Missouri River below Black Eagle dam. The Montana Department of Environmental Quality estimated in 2002 that between 27,500,000 cubic yards (21,000,000 m^{3}) and 31,000,000 cubic yards (24,000,000 m^{3}) of waste were dumped into the river between 1892 and 1915. EPA samples indicated that the contamination could extend as far downstream as Fort Benton, 34 miles (55 km) away. Toxins present in the water and riverbed, according to the EPA, include antimony, arsenic, cadmium, chromium, cobalt, copper, iron, lead, manganese, mercury, nickel, silver, sodium, and zinc.

== Bibliography ==
- Chernow, Ron. Titan: The Life of John D. Rockefeller, Sr. New York: Vintage, 1997.
- Frederick, David C. Rugged Justice: The Ninth Circuit Court of Appeals and the American West, 1891–1941. Berkeley, Calif.: University of California Press, 1994.
- "Great Falls, Montana." Mines and Minerals. March 1909.
- Guthrie, C.W. All Aboard! for Glacier: The Great Northern Railway and Glacier National Park. Helena, Mont.: Farcountry Press, 2004.
- Hidy, Ralph W.; Hidy, Muriel E.; and Scott, Roy V. The Great Northern Railway: A History. Minneapolis: University of Minnesota Press, 2004.
- Hofman, H.O. "Notes on the Metallurgy of Copper of Montana." Transactions of the American Institute of Mining Engineers. New York: American Institute of Mining Engineers, 1904.
- Hyde, Charles K. Copper for America: The United States Copper Industry From Colonial Times to the 1990s. Tucson: University of Arizona Press, 1998.
- Ingham, John N. "Lewisohn, Adolph." In Biographical Dictionary of American Business Leaders. Wesport, Conn.: Greenwood Press, 1983.
- Malone, Michael P. The Battle for Butte: Mining and Politics on the Northern Frontier, 1864–1906. Seattle: University of Washington Press, 2006.
- Malone, Michael P. James J. Hill: Empire Builder of the Northwest. Norman, Okla.: University of Oklahoma Press, 1996.
- Marcosson, Isaac F. Anaconda. New York: Anaconda Company, 1957.
- Martin, Albro. James J. Hill and the Opening of the Northwest. St. Paul: Minnesota Historical Society Press, 1991.
- McCormick, Mary. Written Descriptive and Historical Data. Black Eagle Hydroelectric Facility. Great Falls Hydroelectric Facilities. Great Falls Vicinity, Cascade County, Montana. HAER No. MT-97. Historic American Engineering Office. National Park Service. Department of the Interior. September 1996.
- McNeils, Sarah. Copper King at War: The Biography of F. Augustus Heinze. Missoula, Mont.: University of Montana Press, 1968.
- Morris, Patrick F. Anaconda, Montana: Copper Smelting Boom Town on the Western Frontier. Bethesda, Md.: Swann Publishing, 1997.
- The Montana Almanac. Missoula, Mont.: Montana State University, 1958.
- Mutschler, Charles V. Wired for Success: The Butte, Anaconda & Pacific Railway, 1892–1985. Pullman, Wash.: Washington State University Press, 2002.
- Parker, Maurice S. "Black Eagle Falls Dam, Great Falls, Montana." Transactions of the American Society of Civil Engineers. July 1892.
- Peterson, Don. Great Falls. Charleston, S.C.: Arcadia Publishing, 2010.
- Punke, Michael. Fire and Brimstone: The North Butte Mining Disaster of 1917. New York: Hyperion, 2006.
- Report of the Bureau of Agriculture, Labor and Industry of the State of Montana. Bureau of Agriculture, Labor, and Industry. State of Montana. Helena, Mont.: Independent Publishing Co., 1908.
- "St. Paul Minneapolis and Manitoba." Railway News. November 30, 1889.
- Strom, Claire. Profiting From the Plains: The Great Northern Railway and Corporate Development of the American West. Seattle: University of Washington Press, 2003.
- Taliaferro, John. Charles M. Russell: The Life and Legend of America's Cowboy Artist. Norman, Okla.: University of Oklahoma Press, 2003.
- Whitten, David O. and Whitten, Bessie Emrick. The Birth of Big Business in the United States, 1860–1914: Commercial, Extractive, and Industrial Enterprise. Westport, Conn.: Praeger, 2006.
