= Roberts Building (Great Falls, Montana) =

- U.S. National Register of Historic Places
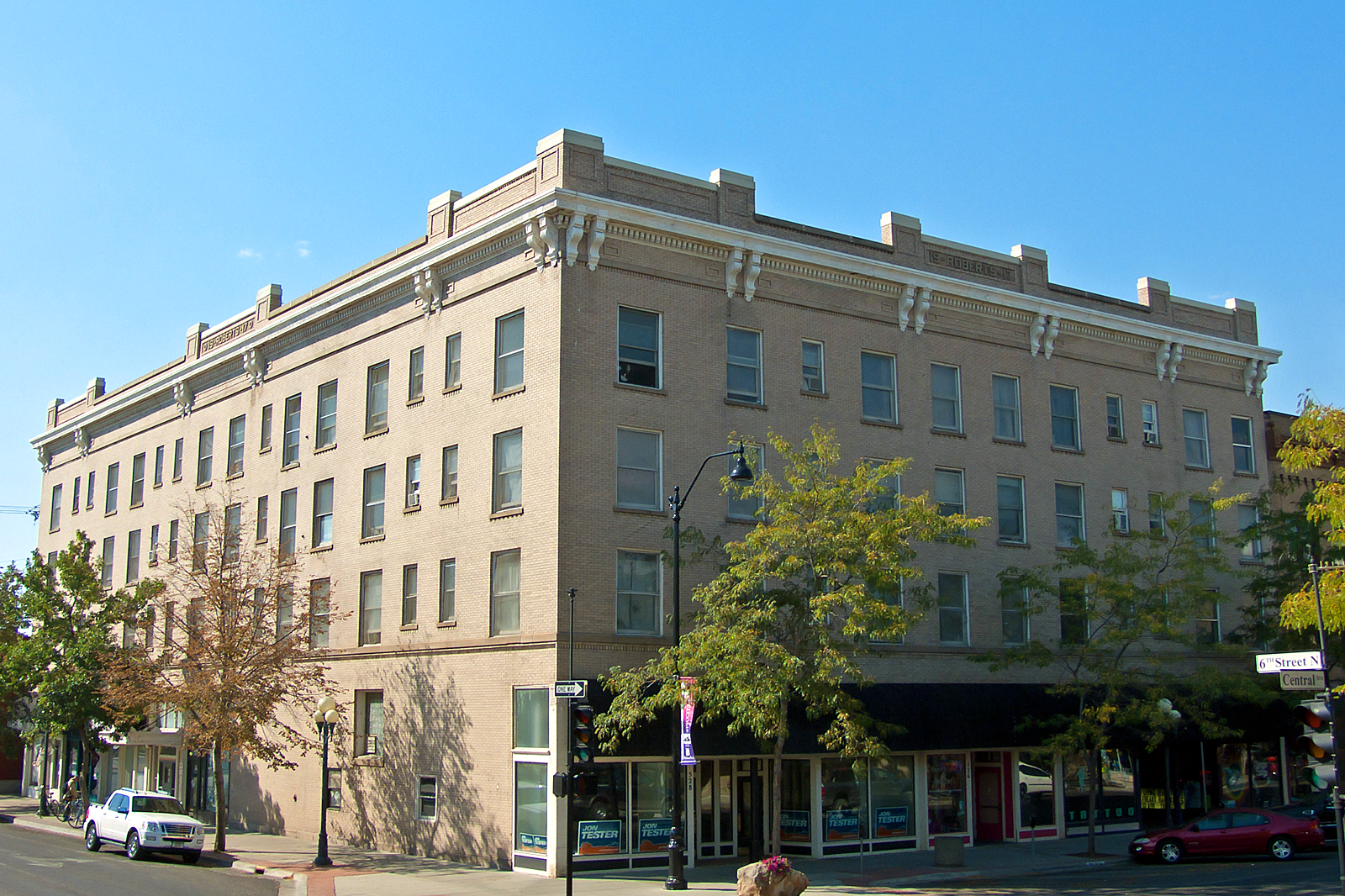

- Location within Montana Location within the United States
- Location: 520--526 Central Ave., Great Falls, Montana
- Coordinates: 47°30′18″N 111°17′49″W
- Area: less than one acre
- Built: 1917
- Architect: Roberts, William; Black, H.N.
- Architectural style: Classical Revival
- NRHP reference No.: 85002165
- Added to NRHP: September 12, 1985

The Roberts Building in Great Falls, Montana, also known as Elmore Hotel, was built in 1917. It was listed on the National Register of Historic Places in 1985.

It is notable for its association with William Roberts, who was important in the development of downtown Great Falls during 1886–1926.
