= Belt Commercial Historic District =

Historic district in Montana, United States

- U.S. National Register of Historic Places
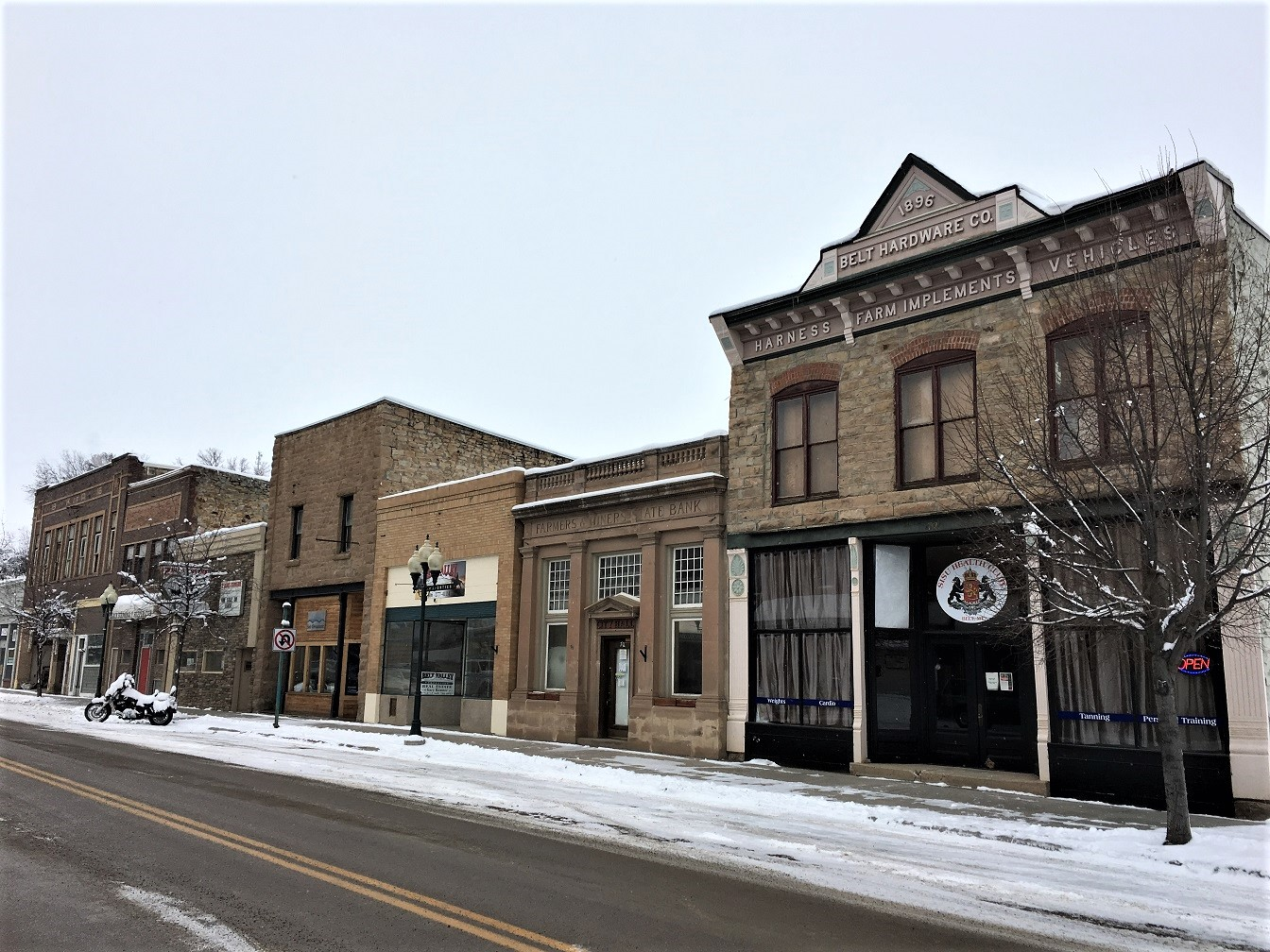

- Location within Montana Location within the United States
- Location: Castner St., Belt, Montana
- Coordinates: 47°23′12″N 110°55′39″W
- Area: 8 acres (3.2 ha)
- Built: 1896
- Built by: Barto, Eugene Barto, Nels Roman, Otto Hokanson, Lease & Lease
- Architectural style: Classical Revival, Western Commercial
- NRHP reference No.: 04001380
- Added to NRHP: December 23, 2004

The Belt Commercial Historic District, on Castner St. in Belt, Montana, dates from 1896. It was listed on the National Register of Historic Places in 2004 as a historic district. The listing included 13 contributing buildings and two contributing structures.
