= Gamwell House =

Historic house in Washington, United States

- U.S. National Register of Historic Places
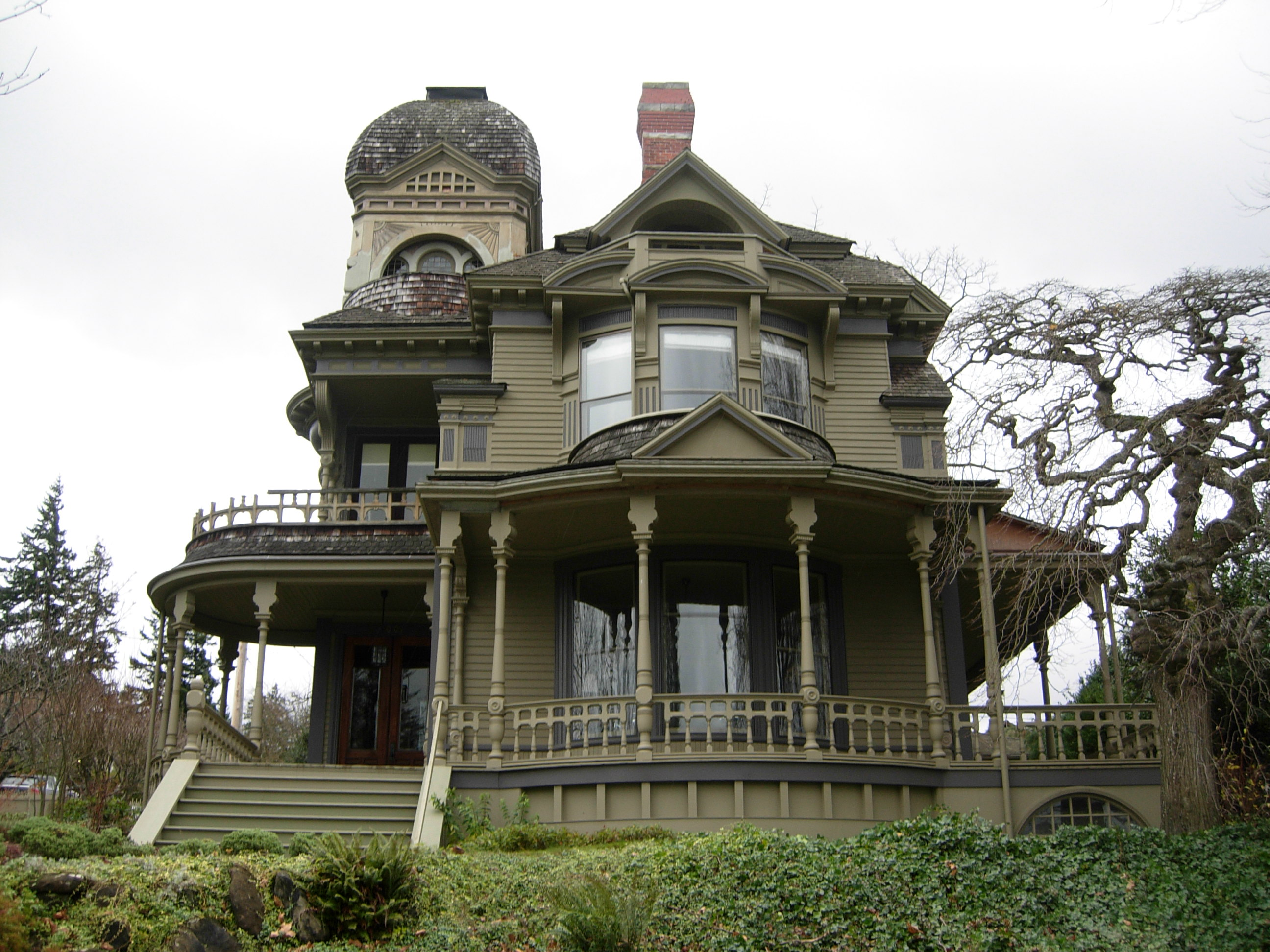

- Location within Washington (state)
- Location: 1001 16th St., Bellingham, Washington
- Coordinates: 48°43′26″N 122°29′44″W
- Area: 0.3 acres (0.12 ha)
- Built: 1890
- Architect: Longstaff & Black
- Architectural style: Late Victorian
- NRHP reference No.: 72001282
- Added to NRHP: March 16, 1972

The Gamwell House was designed by architects Longstaff & Black and was built in 1892. It is one of the most distinguished Late Victorian era homes in the area of Bellingham, Washington. It was listed on the National Register of Historic Places in 1972.

The architectural firm of Longstaff and Black was "an eastern firm who had come from the Boston area to the Bellingham Bay real estate boom"; they also are credited with designing the Cascade County Courthouse in Montana.
