= Charles Arthur Broadwater =

American banker

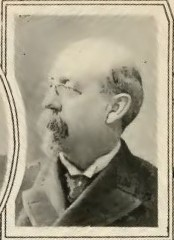
Charles A. Broadwater

Charles Arthur Broadwater (September 25, 1840 – May 24, 1892) was a wealthy and influential Montana railroad, real estate, and banking magnate.

Broadwater was born in St. Charles, Missouri. He was president of the Montana Central Railway, a spur line which ran between Great Falls, Montana Helena and Butte, Montana. He opened the Montana National Bank in Helena, and had extensive real estate holdings in the state. Montana's Broadwater County is named after him.

Broadwater began his career in 1862 as a livestock trader in the gold rush town of Bannack, Montana. He soon extended his interests into transportation, becoming superintendent of the large Diamond R Freighting Company, which dominated shipping in the Territory of Montana before the coming of the railroads. In the 1870s, Broadwater allied himself with James J. Hill, founder of the St. Paul, Minneapolis & Manitoba Railway, which, in 1890, became the Great Northern Railway (U.S.). Broadwater was also one of the Democratic "Big Four" of early Montana politics, along with Marcus Daly, William A. Clark, and Samuel T. Hauser.

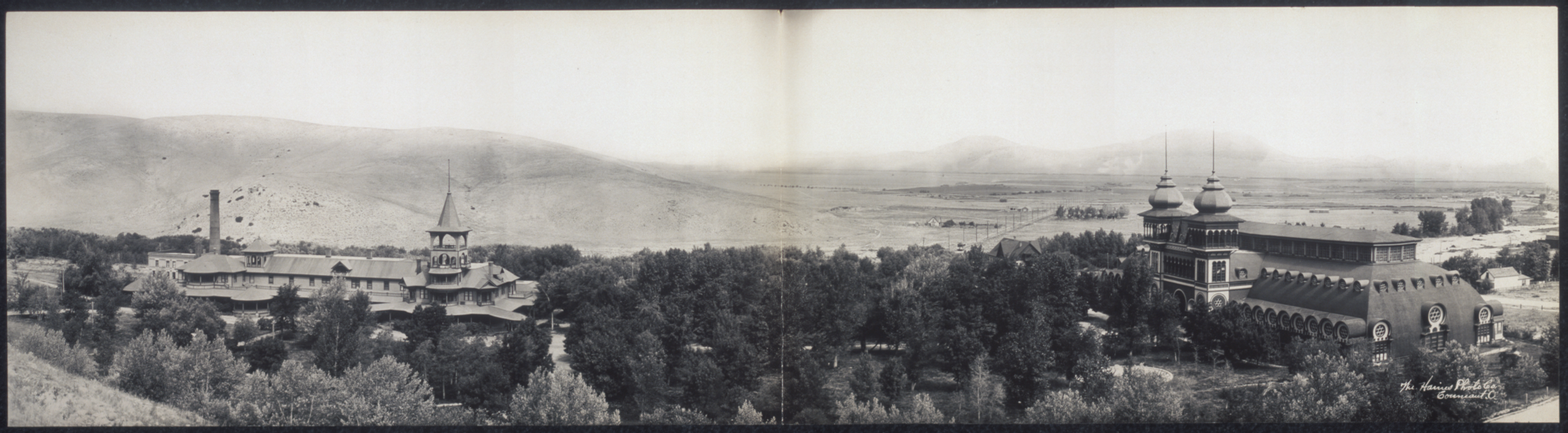
The Hotel Broadwater and Natatorium.

He may, however, be best remembered for the luxurious but ill-fated Hotel Broadwater and Natatorium, which he built near Helena between 1888 and 1889. He hoped to capitalize on Montana's newfound mining elite and the wealth that came along with it but although the hotel was the last word in luxury and innovation it was never able to draw the wealthy crowds that Charles Broadwater predicted.

Broadwater died at his hotel in Helena, Montana on May 24, 1892, aged 51, of the effects of influenza contracted in New York the previous year. More than 5,000 people attended his funeral. He is buried in Forestvale Cemetery.
