= Cascade County Courthouse =

- U.S. National Register of Historic Places
- U.S. Historic district – Contributing property
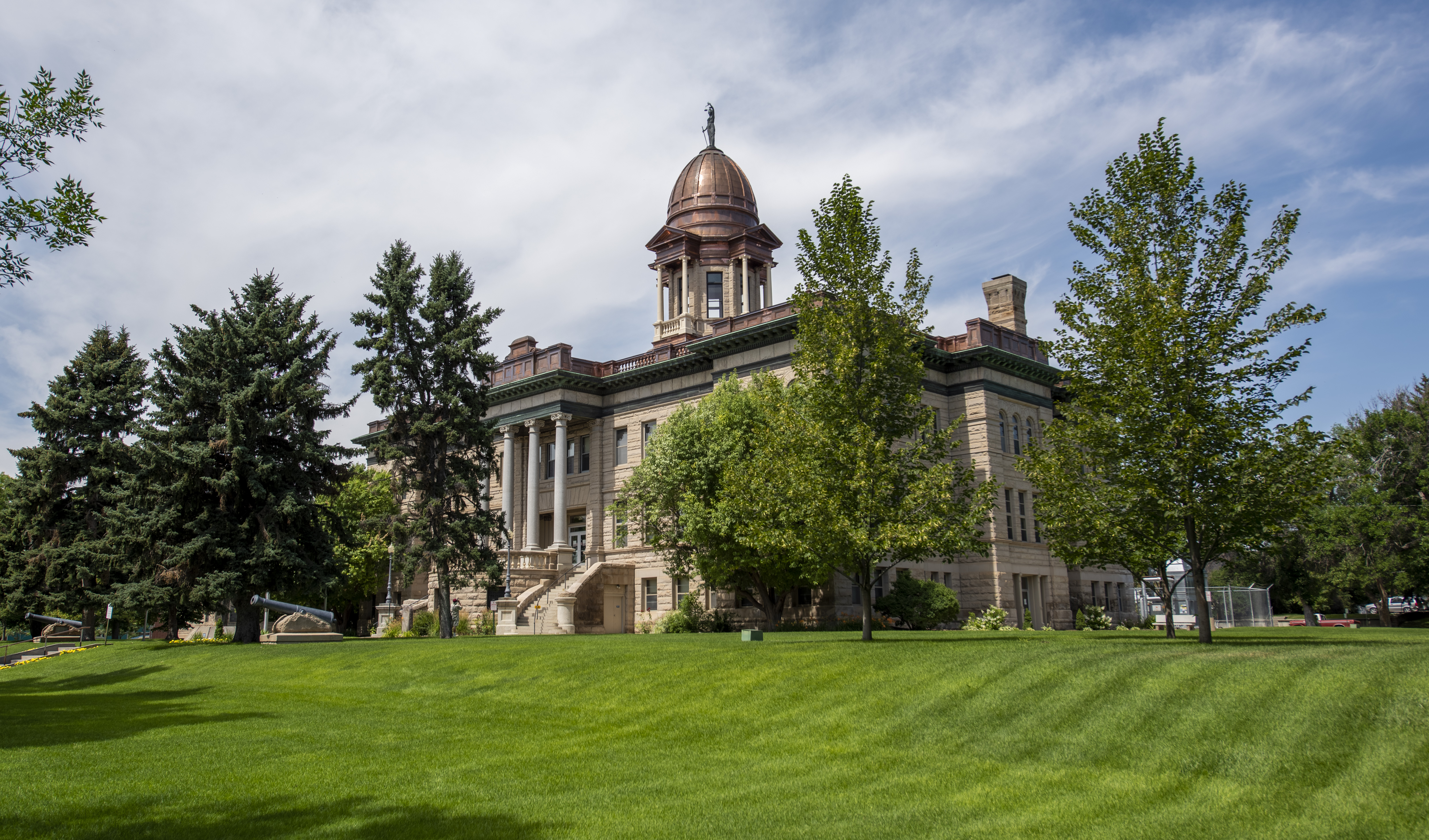

- Location within Montana Location within the United States
- Interactive map showing the location of Cascade County Courthouse
- Location: 415 2nd Ave., N., Great Falls, Montana
- Coordinates: 47°30′29″N 111°17′58″W
- Area: 2.8 acres (1.1 ha)
- Built: 1901
- Architect: H.N. Black; Frank Longstaff
- Architectural style: Late 19th and 20th Century Revivals, French Renaissance
- Part of: Great Falls Northside Residential Historic District (ID91000355)
- NRHP reference No.: 80002401

Significant dates
- Added to NRHP: April 16, 1980
- Designated CP: April 1, 1991

The Cascade County Courthouse in Great Falls, Montana is a historic courthouse built in 1901–1903, located in the town's civic district. Founded in 1887, Cascade County conducted its business from several office buildings in town until the courthouse was built. The full city block site was purchased in 1891 at a cost of $20,000, but there was not enough tax revenue for the county to build a courthouse until a decade later. The grey sandstone used in construction was quarried within six miles of the building. A stone dome had been planned, but a copper dome was built instead. It is crowned by a 14-foot statue of Justice. The dome was used during World War II as a lookout for Japanese aircraft.

The building was listed on the National Register of Historic Places (NRHP) in 1980, and is included in the Great Falls Northside Residential Historic District, which was listed on the NRHP in 1991.

Architects Langstaff and Black also designed the Late Victorian style Gamwell House in Bellingham, Washington, which was built in 1890 and is also NRHP-listed. The architectural firm of Longstaff and Black was "an eastern firm who had come from the Boston area to the Bellingham Bay real estate boom."
