= Belt, Montana =

- Town
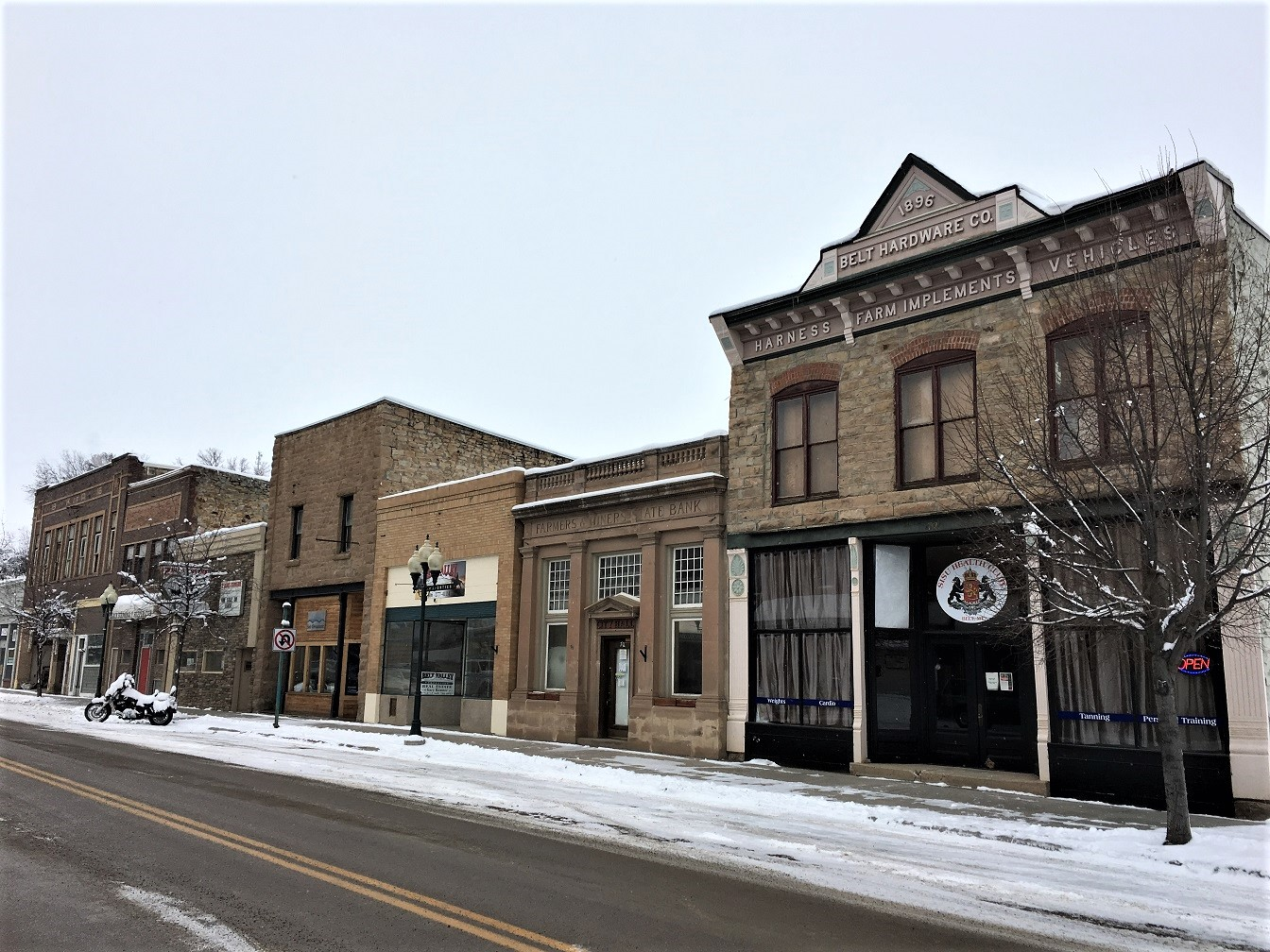

- Seal

- Location of Belt, Montana
- Coordinates: 47°23′14″N 110°55′40″W
- Country: United States
- State: Montana
- County: Cascade

Area
  - Total: 0.34 sq mi (0.88 km^{2})
  - Land: 0.34 sq mi (0.88 km^{2})
  - Water: 0 sq mi (0.00 km^{2})
- Elevation: 3,511 ft (1,070 m)

Population (2020)
  - Total: 510
  - Density: 1,509/sq mi (582.8/km^{2})
- Time zone: UTC-7 (Mountain (MST))
  - Summer (DST): UTC-6 (MDT)
- ZIP code: 59412
- Area code: 406
- FIPS code: 30-05275
- GNIS feature ID: 2409827
- Website: www.cityofbelt.org

Belt is a town in Cascade County, Montana, United States. The population was 510 according to the 2020 census. It is part of the Great Falls, Montana metropolitan area.

The town was named for Belt Butte, a nearby mountain which has a dark layer resembling a belt.

== History ==
Belt was home to Montana's first coal mine. It supplied fuel to Fort Benton. During the coal boom the town was referred to as "Little Pittsburgh", "Coal Banks", or "Black Diamond City". The post office opened on February 2, 1885, with Eugene Clingan as postmaster.

Several talented Finnish carpenters and architects contributed to the growth of the town. Fifteen buildings are included in the Belt Commercial Historic District listing on the National Register of Historic Places.

The Belt Museum is housed in the original town jail, also on the National Register of Historic Places.

When the Great Falls smelters converted from coal to natural gas in 1930, the town's economy lost a significant source of income.

== Geography ==
According to the United States Census Bureau, the town has a total area of 0.34 square miles (0.88 km^{2}), all land.

Belt Creek flows through town. The creek has several types of minnows, suckers, and trout. Nearby are the Highwood Mountains and Little Belt Mountains.

=== Climate ===
According to the Köppen Climate Classification system, Belt has a semi-arid climate, abbreviated "BSk" on climate maps.

== Demographics ==
Historical population
| Census | Pop. | Note | %± |
|---|---|---|---|
| 1910 | 1,158 | | — |
| 1920 | 967 | | −16.5% |
| 1930 | 810 | | −16.2% |
| 1940 | 744 | | −8.1% |
| 1950 | 702 | | −5.6% |
| 1960 | 757 | | 7.8% |
| 1970 | 656 | | −13.3% |
| 1980 | 825 | | 25.8% |
| 1990 | 571 | | −30.8% |
| 2000 | 633 | | 10.9% |
| 2010 | 597 | | −5.7% |
| 2020 | 510 | | −14.6% |
U.S. Decennial Census

=== 2010 census ===
As of the census of 2010, there were 597 people, 261 households, and 159 families living in the town. The population density was 1,705.7 inhabitants per square mile (658.6/km^{2}). There were 295 housing units at an average density of 842.9 per square mile (325.4/km^{2}). The racial makeup of the town was 95.5% White, 1.7% Native American, 0.5% Asian, 0.2% from other races, and 2.2% from two or more races. Hispanic or Latino of any race were 1.0% of the population.

There were 261 households, of which 29.1% had children under the age of 18 living with them, 47.5% were married couples living together, 10.7% had a female householder with no husband present, 2.7% had a male householder with no wife present, and 39.1% were non-families. 33.0% of all households were made up of individuals, and 13.7% had someone living alone who was 65 years of age or older. The average household size was 2.29 and the average family size was 2.92.

The median age in the town was 43.4 years. 23.8% of residents were under the age of 18; 7.6% were between the ages of 18 and 24; 20.4% were from 25 to 44; 30.4% were from 45 to 64; and 18.1% were 65 years of age or older. The gender makeup of the town was 50.1% male and 49.9% female.

=== 2000 census ===
As of the census of 2000, there were 666 people, 273 households, and 168 families living in the city. The population density was 1,877.0 inhabitants per square mile (724.7/km^{2}). There were 295 housing units at an average density of 874.7 per square mile (337.7/km^{2}). The racial makeup of the city was 94.94% White, 1.42% African American, 1.42% Native American, 0.32% Pacific Islander, 0.16% from other races, and 1.74% from two or more races. Hispanic or Latino of any race were 1.11% of the population.

There were 273 households, out of which 28.9% had children under the age of 18 living with them, 49.1% were married couples living together, 8.8% had a female householder with no husband present, and 38.1% were non-families. 35.9% of all households were made up of individuals, and 18.7% had someone living alone who was 65 years of age or older. The average household size was 2.32 and the average family size was 3.03.

In the city, the population was spread out, with 26.5% under the age of 18, 7.4% from 18 to 24, 25.9% from 25 to 44, 24.2% from 45 to 64, and 16.0% who were 65 years of age or older. The median age was 39 years. For every 100 females, there were 90.7 males. For every 100 females age 18 and over, there were 83.8 males.

The median income for a household in the city was $25,469, and the median income for a family was $30,104. Males had a median income of $21,477 versus $20,192 for females. The per capita income for the city was $14,970. About 10.2% of families and 12.9% of the population were below the poverty line, including 19.8% of those under age 18 and 16.5% of those age 65 or over.

== Government ==
Belt has a mayor and city council. In November 2025 Travis S. Page ran unopposed for mayor. The mayor in 2022 was Jim Olson.

== Education ==
Belt Public Schools educates students from kindergarten through 12th grade. They are known as the Huskies. Belt High School is a Class C school, a classification used for athletic competitions in the state.

== Media ==
The Judith Basin Press is the newspaper serving Belt. It is based in Stanford and published weekly.

Radio station KGFJ is licensed in Belt. It is part of Christian Satellite Network (CSN) International.

== Infrastructure and economy ==
U.S. Route 89 runs south and west of town. Montana Secondary Highway 331 enters town from the west and exits through the north.

The nearest airport is the Great Falls International Airport.

Great Falls also has the nearest medical facilities.

Harvest Moon Brewing Company produces craft beer. As of 2023 they have distributors in five states.

== Notable people ==
- James R. Browning, judge on the United States Court of Appeals for the Ninth Circuit
- Matt Maki, Finnish-born master carpenter and builder of the 1890s

== See also ==
- List of cities and towns in Montana
