= Montana Central Railway =

US railway company, 1886–1907

Overview
- Reporting mark: MC
- Locale: Devils Lake, North Dakota to Butte, Montana
- Dates of operation: 1887–1907
- Successor: Great Northern Railway

Technical
- Track gauge: 4 ft 8 1/2 in (1,435 mm) standard gauge

The Montana Central Railway was a railway company which operated in the American state of Montana from 1886 to 1907. It was constructed by James Jerome Hill's St. Paul, Minneapolis & Manitoba Railway, and became part of the Great Northern Railway in 1889.

== History ==
James Jerome Hill, primary stockholder and president of the St. Paul, Minneapolis & Manitoba Railway (StPM&M), established the Montana Central Railway on January 25, 1886. Few railroads served Montana at that time. But Butte, Montana, was a booming mining town that needed to get its metals to market; gold and silver had been discovered near Helena, Montana; and coal companies in Canada were eager to get their fuel to Montana's smelters. Hill had already decided to build the StPM&M across the northern tier of Montana, and it made sense to build a north-south railroad through central Montana to connect Great Falls with Helena and Butte. Another reason for building the Montana Central was Hill's investment in the city of Great Falls. Hill's close friend and business associate, Paris Gibson, had founded the town of Great Falls on the Great Falls of the Missouri River in 1883, and was promoting it as a site for the development of cheap hydroelectricity and heavy industry. Hill organized the Great Falls Water Power & Townsite Company in 1887, with the goal of developing the town of Great Falls; providing it with power, sewage, and water; and attracting commerce and industry to the city. To attract industry to the new city, he offered low rates on the Montana Central Railway.

Surveyors and engineers began grading a route between Helena and Great Falls in the winter of 1885-1886 (even before the company had been incorporated), and by the end of 1886 had surveyed a route from Helena to Butte. Utah businessmen Alfred W. McCune, John Caplis (also known as John Caplice), and Walter Read along with Helena, Montana, businessman Hugh Kirkendall formed a company to build the road. Construction on the Great Northern's line westward began in late 1886, and on October 16, 1887, the link between Devils Lake, North Dakota; Fort Assinniboine (near the present-day city of Havre); and Great Falls was complete. Service to Helena began in November 1887, and Butte followed on November 10, 1888.

The Montana Central's engines and cars were marked either with "Great Northern" or "Montana Central," with the capital letters "MC" over the number of the car or engine.

On September 18, 1889, Hill changed the name of the Minneapolis and St. Cloud Railway (a railroad which existed primarily on paper, but which held very extensive land grants throughout the Pacific Northwest) to the Great Northern Railway. On February 1, 1890, he transferred ownership of the StPM&M, Montana Central, and other rail systems he owned to the Great Northern. For many years, these subsidiaries operated independently. But most of them were later absorbed into the Great Northern. In 1907, the Montana Central ceased to exist after it was made part of the Great Northern.

== Bibliography ==
- Guthrie, C.W. All Aboard! for Glacier: The Great Northern Railway and Glacier National Park. Helena, Mont.: Farcountry Press, 2004.
- Hidy, Ralph W.; Hidy, Muriel E.; and Scott, Roy V. The Great Northern Railway: A History. Minneapolis: University of Minnesota Press, 2004.
- Malone, Michael P. James J. Hill: Empire Builder of the Northwest. Norman, Okla.: University of Oklahoma Press, 1996.
- Martin, Albro. James J. Hill and the Opening of the Northwest. St. Paul: Minnesota Historical Society Press, 1991.
- McCormick, Mary. Written Descriptive and Historical Data. Black Eagle Hydroelectric Facility. Great Falls Hydroelectric Facilities. Great Falls Vicinity, Cascade County, Montana. HAER No. MT-97. Historic American Engineering Office. National Park Service. Department of the Interior. September 1996.
- The Montana Almanac. Missoula, Mont.: Montana State University, 1958.
- The Official Railway Equipment Register. New York: Railway Equipment and Publication Co., 1901.
- Report of the Bureau of Agriculture, Labor and Industry of the State of Montana. Bureau of Agriculture, Labor, and Industry. State of Montana. Helena, Mont.: Independent Publishing Co., 1908.
- "St. Paul Minneapolis and Manitoba." Railway News. November 30, 1889.
- Strom, Claire. Profiting From the Plains: The Great Northern Railway and Corporate Development of the American West. Seattle: University of Washington Press, 2003.
- Taliaferro, John. Charles M. Russell: The Life and Legend of America's Cowboy Artist. Norman, Okla.: University of Oklahoma Press, 2003.
- Wood, Struthers & Co. Railroad Bond Issues Officially Regarded as Legal Investments in the State of New York on the First of July 1916. New York: Wood, Struthers & Co., 1916.
- Yenne, Bill. Great Northern Empire Builder. St. Paul, Minn.: MBI Publishing, 2005.
- Whitney, Orson Ferguson. History of Utah. Salt Lake City: G.Q. Cannon, 1904.
