= Missouri River =

Major river in central United States

Missouri River Pekitanoui, Big Muddy, Mighty Mo, Wide Missouri, Kícpaaruksti’, Mnišoše, Ñíšúje
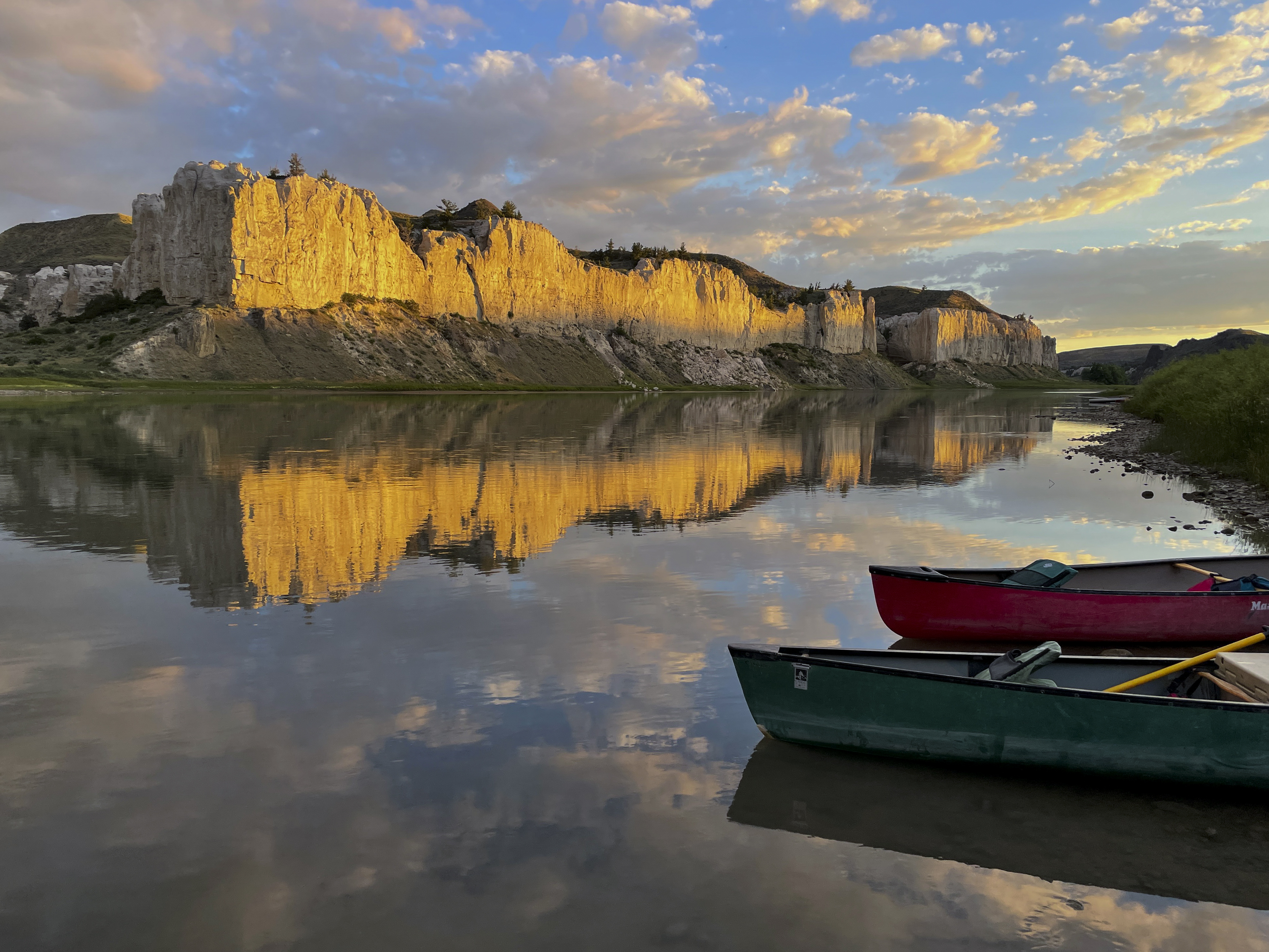
- The Missouri River in Montana

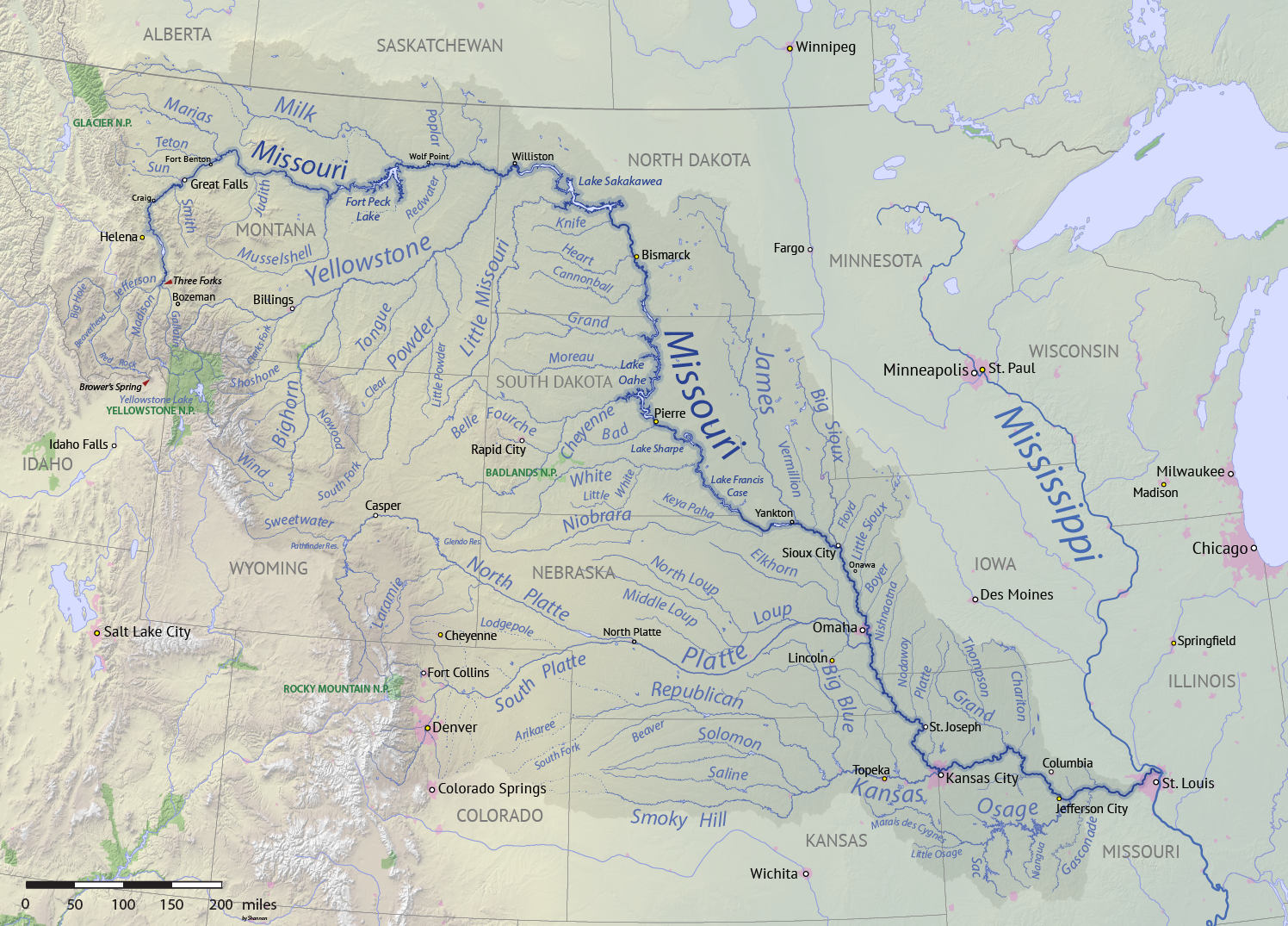
- Map of the Missouri River and its tributaries in North America
- Etymology: The Missouri tribe, whose name in turn means "people with wooden canoes"
- Native name: Kícpaaruksti’ (Pawnee); Mnišóše (Lakota); Ñíšúje (Iowa-Oto)

Location
- Country: United States
- State: Montana, North Dakota, South Dakota, Nebraska, Iowa, Kansas, Missouri
- Major cities: Great Falls, MT, Bismarck, ND, Pierre, SD, Sioux City, IA, Omaha, NE, Brownville, NE, Saint Joseph, MO, Kansas City, MO-KS

Physical characteristics
- Source: Brower's Spring
  - location: near Brower's Spring
  - coordinates: 44°33′02″N 111°28′21″W
  - length: 295 mi (475 km)
  - elevation: 9,100 ft (2,800 m)
- 2nd source: Firehole River–Madison River
  - location: Madison Lake, Yellowstone National Park, WY
  - coordinates: 44°20′55″N 110°51′53″W
  - length: 183 mi (295 km)
  - elevation: 8,215 ft (2,504 m)
- Source confluence: Missouri Headwaters State Park
  - location: Three Forks, MT
  - coordinates: 45°55′39″N 111°20′39″W
  - elevation: 4,042 ft (1,232 m)
- Mouth: Mississippi River
  - location: Spanish Lake, MO
  - coordinates: 38°48′49″N 90°07′11″W
  - elevation: 404 ft (123 m)
- Length: 2,341 mi (3,767 km)
- Basin size: 529,350 sq mi (1,371,000 km^{2})
- Discharge
  - location: Hermann, MO; RM 97.9 (RKM 157.6)
  - average: 87,520 cu ft/s (2,478 m^{3}/s)
  - minimum: 602 cu ft/s (17.0 m^{3}/s)
  - maximum: 750,000 cu ft/s (21,000 m^{3}/s)

Basin features
- Tributaries
  - left: Jefferson, Dearborn, Sun, Marias, Milk, James, Big Sioux, Grand, Chariton
  - right: Madison, Gallatin, Yellowstone, Little Missouri, Cheyenne, Bad, White, Niobrara, Platte, Kansas, Osage, Gasconade

National Wild and Scenic River
- Type: Wild, Scenic, Recreational

The Missouri River is a river in the Central and Mountain West regions of the United States. The nation's longest, it rises in the eastern Centennial Mountains of the Bitterroot Range of the Rocky Mountains of southwestern Montana, then flows east and south for 2,341 mi (3,767 km) before entering the Mississippi River north of St. Louis, Missouri. The river drains a semi-arid watershed of more than 500,000 sq mi (1,300,000 km^{2}), which includes parts of ten U.S. states and two Canadian provinces. Although a tributary of the Mississippi, the Missouri River is slightly longer and carries a comparable volume of water. A fellow tributary, the Ohio River, carries more water. When combined with the lower Mississippi River, it forms the world's fourth-longest river system.

For over 12,000 years, people have depended on the Missouri River and its tributaries as a source of sustenance and transportation. More than ten major groups of Native Americans populated the watershed, with most leading a nomadic lifestyle and dependent on enormous bison herds that roamed through the Great Plains. The first Europeans encountered the river in the late seventeenth century, and the region passed through Spanish and French hands before becoming part of the United States through the Louisiana Purchase.

The Missouri River was one of the main routes for the westward expansion of the United States during the 19th century. The growth of the fur trade in the early 19th century laid much of the groundwork as trappers explored the region and blazed trails. Pioneers headed west en masse beginning in the 1830s, first by covered wagon, then by the growing numbers of steamboats that entered service on the river. Conflict between settlers and Native Americans in the watershed led to some of the most longstanding violence of the American Indian Wars.

During the 20th century, the Missouri River basin was extensively developed for irrigation, flood control, and the generation of hydroelectric power. Fifteen dams impound the main stem of the river, with hundreds more on tributaries. The Missouri River's reservoirs include the largest, second-largest, and fourth-largest artificial lakes in the United States by surface area: Lake Sakakawea, Lake Oahe, and Fort Peck Lake. Meanders have been cut off and the river channelized to improve navigation, reducing its length by almost 200 mi (320 km) from pre-development times. Although the lower Missouri valley is now a populous and highly productive agricultural and industrial region, heavy development has taken its toll on wildlife and fish populations as well as water quality.

== Course ==
From the Rocky Mountains, three streams rise to form the headwaters of the Missouri River:

- The longest source stream begins near Brower's Spring in southwest Montana, 9,100 feet (2,800 m) above sea level on the southeastern slopes of Mount Jefferson in the Centennial Mountains. From there it flows west then north; runs first in Hell Roaring Creek then west into the Red Rock; swings northeast to become the Beaverhead River; and finally joins with the Big Hole to form the Jefferson River.
- The Firehole River, which originates in northwest Wyoming at Yellowstone National Park's Madison Lake, joins with the Gibbon River to form the Madison River.
- The Gallatin River flows out of Gallatin Lake which is also in Yellowstone National Park.

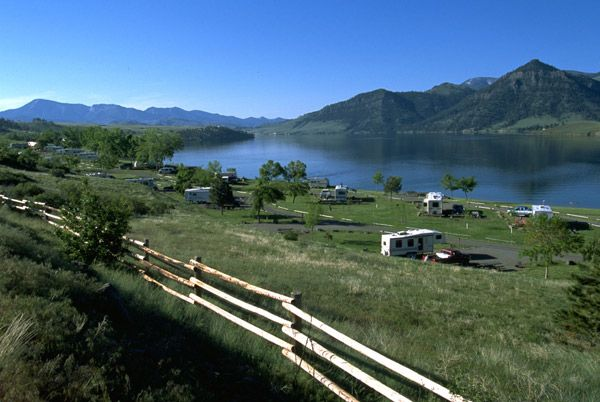
Holter Lake, a reservoir on the upper Missouri River

The Missouri River officially starts at the confluence of the Jefferson and Madison in Missouri Headwaters State Park near Three Forks, Montana, and is joined by the Gallatin a mile (1.6 km) downstream. It then passes through Canyon Ferry Lake, a reservoir west of the Big Belt Mountains. Issuing from the mountains near Cascade, the river flows northeast to the city of Great Falls, where it drops over the Great Falls of the Missouri, a series of five waterfalls. It then winds east through a scenic region of canyons and badlands known as the Missouri Breaks, receiving the Marias River from the west then widening into the Fort Peck Lake reservoir a few miles above the confluence with the Musselshell River. Farther on, the river passes through the Fort Peck Dam, and immediately downstream, the Milk River joins from the north.

Flowing eastward through the plains of eastern Montana, the Missouri receives the Poplar River from the north before crossing into North Dakota where the Yellowstone River, its greatest tributary by volume, joins from the southwest. At the confluence, the Yellowstone is actually the larger river. (Note: The Missouri's flow at Culbertson, Montana, 25 mi (40 km) above the confluence of the two rivers, is about 9,820 cu ft/s (278 m^{3}/s) and the Yellowstone's discharge at Sidney, Montana, roughly the same distance upstream along that river, is about 12,370 cu ft/s (350 m^{3}/s).) The Missouri then meanders east past Williston and into Lake Sakakawea, the reservoir formed by Garrison Dam. Below the dam the Missouri receives the Knife River from the west and flows south to Bismarck, the capital of North Dakota, where the Heart River joins from the west. It slows into the Lake Oahe reservoir just before the Cannonball River confluence. While it continues south, eventually reaching Oahe Dam in South Dakota, the Grand, Moreau and Cheyenne Rivers all join the Missouri from the west.

The Missouri makes a bend to the southeast as it winds through the Great Plains, receiving the Niobrara River and many smaller tributaries from the southwest. It then proceeds to form the boundary of South Dakota and Nebraska and is joined by the James River from the north. At Sioux City the Big Sioux River comes in from the north, after which the Missouri forms the Iowa–Nebraska boundary. It flows south to the city of Omaha where it receives its longest tributary, the Platte River, from the west. Downstream, it begins to define the border between the states of Nebraska and Missouri, then flows between the states of Missouri and Kansas. The Missouri swings east at Kansas City, where the Kansas River enters from the west, and so on into north-central Missouri. To the east of Kansas City, the Missouri receives, on the left side, the Grand River. It passes south of Columbia and receives the Osage and Gasconade Rivers from the south downstream of Jefferson City. The river then rounds the northern side of St. Louis to join the Mississippi River on the border between Missouri and Illinois.

== Watershed ==
There is only one river with a personality, a sense of humor, and a woman's caprice; a river that goes traveling sidewise, that interferes in politics, rearranges geography, and dabbles in real estate; a river that plays hide and seek with you today and tomorrow follows you around like a pet dog with a dynamite cracker tied to his tail. That river is the Missouri.

— George Fitch

The Missouri River's drainage basin spans 529,350 square miles (1,371,000 km^{2}), encompassing nearly one-sixth of the area of the United States or just over five percent of the continent of North America. Comparable to the size of the Canadian province of Quebec, the watershed covers most of the central Great Plains, stretching from the Rocky Mountains in the west to the Mississippi River Valley in the east and from the southern extreme of western Canada to the border of the Arkansas River watershed. Compared with the Mississippi River above their confluence, the Missouri is twice as long (Note: The Mississippi River flows for approximately 1,172 miles (1,886 km) above St. Louis, which is just over half of the Missouri's length.) and drains an area three times as large. (Note: The Mississippi drains an area of 172,200 mi^{2} (446,000 km^{2}) above the confluence with the Missouri River.) The Missouri accounts for 45 percent of the annual flow of the Mississippi past St. Louis, and as much as 70 percent in certain droughts.

In 1990, the Missouri River watershed was home to about 12 million people. This included the entire population of the U.S. state of Nebraska, parts of the U.S. states of Colorado, Iowa, Kansas, Minnesota, Missouri, Montana, North Dakota, South Dakota, and Wyoming, and small southern portions of the Canadian provinces of Alberta and Saskatchewan. The watershed's largest city is Denver, Colorado, with a population of more than six hundred thousand. Denver is the main city of the Front Range Urban Corridor whose cities had a combined population of over four million in 2005, making it the largest metropolitan area in the Missouri River basin. Other major population centers – mostly in the watershed's southeastern portion – include Omaha, Nebraska, north of the confluence of the Missouri and Platte Rivers; Kansas City, Missouri – Kansas City, Kansas, at the confluence of the Missouri with the Kansas River; and the St. Louis metropolitan area, south of the Missouri River just below the latter's mouth, on the Mississippi. In contrast, the northwestern part of the watershed is sparsely populated. However, many northwestern cities, such as Billings, Montana, are among the fastest growing in the Missouri basin.

With more than 170,000 square miles (440,000 km^{2}) under the plow, the Missouri River watershed includes roughly one-fourth of all the agricultural land in the United States, providing more than a third of the country's wheat, flax, barley, and oats. However, only 11,000 square miles (28,000 km^{2}) of farmland in the basin is irrigated. A further 281,000 square miles (730,000 km^{2}) of the basin is devoted to the raising of livestock, mainly cattle. Forested areas of the watershed, mostly second-growth, total about 43,700 square miles (113,000 km^{2}). Urban areas, on the other hand, comprise less than 13,000 square miles (34,000 km^{2}) of land. Most built-up areas are along the main stem and a few major tributaries, including the Platte and Yellowstone Rivers.

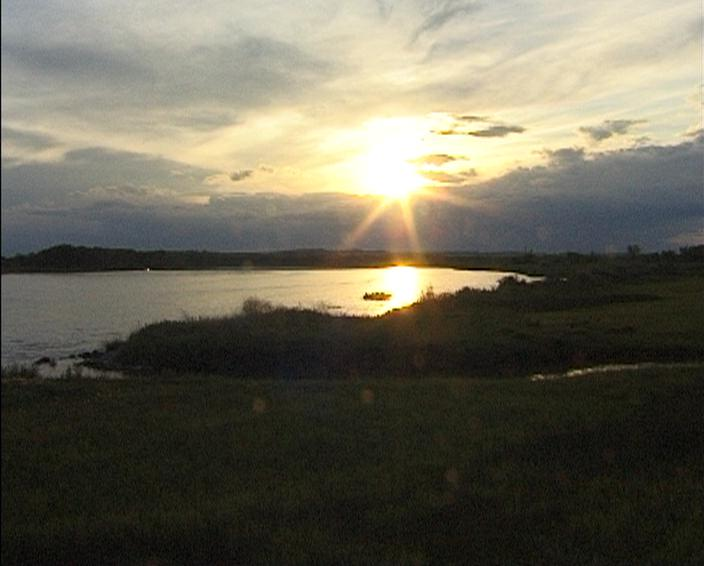
The Missouri in North Dakota, which was the furthest upstream that French explorers traveled on the river

Elevation in the watershed varies from just over 400 feet (120 m) at the Missouri's mouth to the 14,293-foot (4,357 m) summit of Mount Lincoln in central Colorado. The river drops 8,626 feet (2,629 m) from Brower's Spring, the farthest source. Although the plains of the watershed have extremely little local vertical relief, the land rises about 10 feet per mile (1.9 m/km) from east to west. The elevation is less than 500 feet (150 m) at the eastern border of the watershed, but is over 3,000 feet (910 m) above sea level in many places at the base of the Rockies.

The Missouri's drainage basin has highly variable weather and rainfall patterns, Overall, the watershed is defined by a continental climate with warm, wet summers and harsh, cold winters. Most of the watershed receives an average of 8 to 10 inches (200 to 250 mm) of precipitation each year. However, the westernmost portions of the basin in the Rockies as well as southeastern regions in Missouri may receive as much as 40 inches (1,000 mm). The vast majority of precipitation occurs in summer in most of the lower and middle basin, although the upper basin is known for short-lived but intense summer thunderstorms such as the one which produced the 1972 Black Hills flood through Rapid City, South Dakota. Winter temperatures in the northern and western portions of the basin typically drop to −20 °F (−28.9 °C) or lower every winter with extremes as low as −60 °F (−51.1 °C), while summer highs occasionally exceed 100 °F (37.8 °C) in all areas except the higher elevations of Montana, Wyoming and Colorado. Extreme maxima — almost all prior to 1960 — have exceeded 115 °F (46.1 °C) in all US states in the basin.

As one of the continent's most significant river systems, the Missouri's drainage basin borders on many other major watersheds of the United States and Canada. The Continental Divide, running along the spine of the Rocky Mountains, forms most of the western border of the Missouri watershed. The Clark Fork and Snake River, both part of the Columbia River basin, drain the area west of the Rockies in Montana, Idaho and western Wyoming. The Columbia, Missouri and Colorado River watersheds meet at Three Waters Mountain in Wyoming's Wind River Range. South of there, the Missouri basin is bordered on the west by the drainage of the Green River, a tributary of the Colorado, then on the south by the mainstem of the Colorado. Both the Colorado and Columbia Rivers flow to the Pacific Ocean. However, a large endorheic drainage called the Great Divide Basin exists between the Missouri and Green watersheds in western Wyoming. This area is sometimes counted as part of the Missouri River watershed, even though its waters do not flow to either side of the Continental Divide.

To the north, the much lower Laurentian Divide separates the Missouri River watershed from those of the Oldman River, a tributary of the South Saskatchewan River, as well as the Souris, Sheyenne, and smaller tributaries of the Red River of the North. All of these streams are part of Canada's Nelson River drainage basin, which empties into Hudson Bay. There are also several large endorheic basins between the Missouri and Nelson watersheds in southern Alberta and Saskatchewan. The Minnesota and Des Moines Rivers, tributaries of the upper Mississippi, drain most of the area bordering the eastern side of the Missouri River basin. Finally, on the south, the Ozark Mountains and other low divides through central Missouri, Kansas and Colorado separate the Missouri watershed from those of the White River and Arkansas River, also tributaries of the Mississippi River.

=== Major tributaries ===
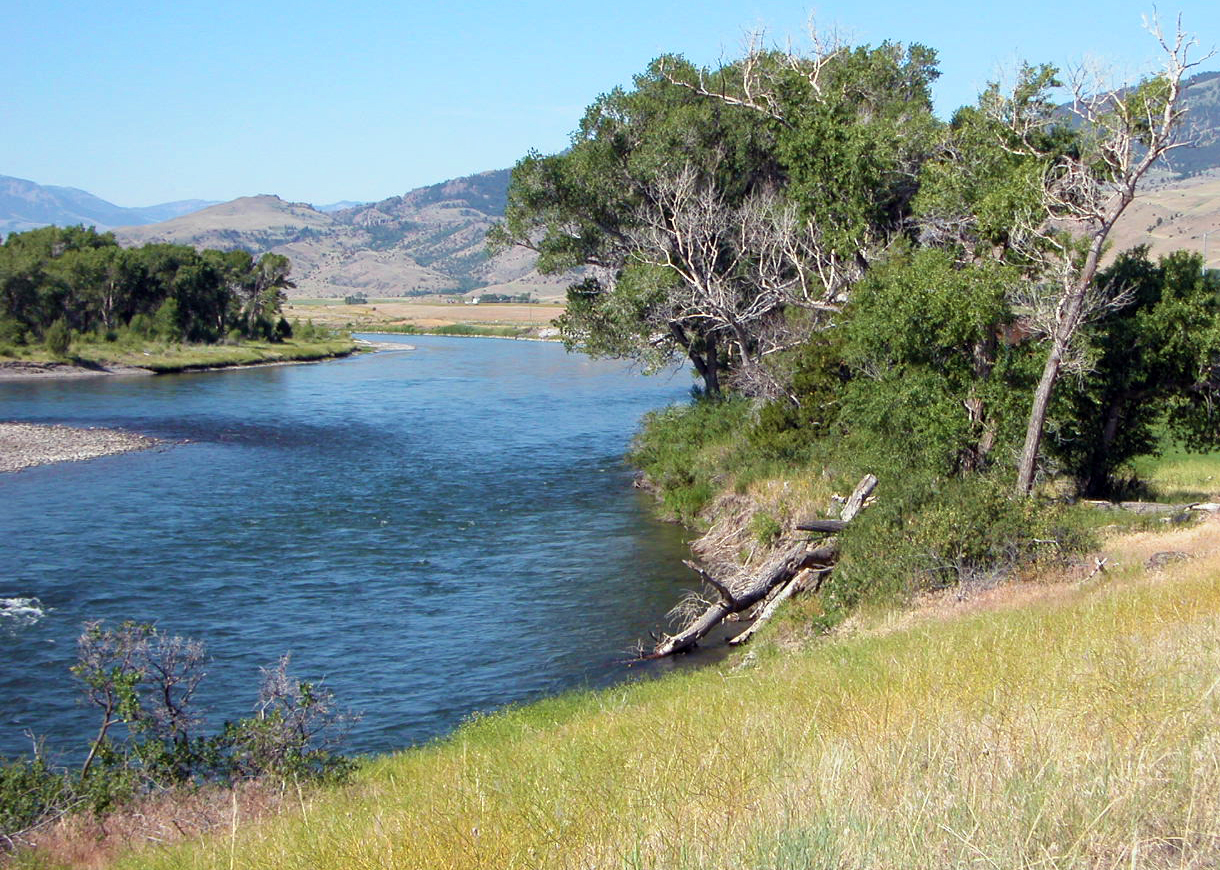
The Yellowstone River, the fifth longest tributary of the Missouri, which it joins in North Dakota

Over 95 significant tributaries and hundreds of smaller ones feed the Missouri River, with most of the larger ones coming in as the river draws close to the mouth. Most rivers and streams in the Missouri River basin flow from west to east, following the incline of the Great Plains; however, some eastern tributaries such as the James, Big Sioux and Grand River systems flow from north to south.

The Missouri's largest tributaries by runoff are the Yellowstone in Montana and Wyoming, the Platte in Wyoming, Colorado, and Nebraska, and the Kansas–Republican/Smoky Hill and Osage in Kansas and Missouri. Each of these tributaries drains an area greater than 50,000 square miles (130,000 km^{2}) or has an average discharge greater than 5,000 cu ft/s (140 m^{3}/s). The Yellowstone River has the highest discharge, even though the Platte is longer and drains a larger area. In fact, the Yellowstone's flow is about 13,800 cu ft/s (390 m^{3}/s) – accounting for sixteen percent of total runoff in the Missouri basin and nearly double that of the Platte. On the other end of the scale is the tiny Roe River in Montana, which at 201 feet (61 m) long is one of the world's shortest rivers.

Longest tributaries of the Missouri River
Name	Length		Watershed		Discharge	
	mi	km	mi^{2}	km^{2}	ft^{3}/s	m^{3}/s
Platte River	1,061	1,708	84,910	219,900	7,037	199
Kansas River	749	1,205	59,500	154,000	7,367	209
Milk River	729	1,170	15,300	39,600	618	17.5
James River	710	1,140	21,500	55,700	646	18.3
Yellowstone River	702	1,130	70,000	180,000	13,800	391
White River	580	933	10,200	26,420	570	16.1
Niobrara River	568	914	13,900	36,000	1,720	48.7
Little Missouri River	560	900	9,550	24,700	533	15.1
Osage River	493	793	14,800	38,300	11,980	339
Big Sioux River	419	674	8,030	20,800	1,320	37.4

The table on the right lists the ten longest tributaries of the Missouri, along with their respective catchment areas and flows. Length is measured to the hydrologic source, regardless of naming convention. The main stem of the Kansas River, for example, is 148 miles (238 km) long. However, including the longest headwaters tributaries, the 453-mile (729 km) Republican River and the 156-mile (251 km) Arikaree River, brings the total length to 749 miles (1,205 km). Similar naming issues are encountered with the Platte River, whose longest tributary, the North Platte River, is more than twice as long as its mainstream.

The Missouri's headwaters above Three Forks extend much farther upstream than the main stem. Measured to the farthest source at Brower's Spring, the Jefferson River is 298 miles (480 km) long. Thus measured to its highest headwaters, the Missouri River stretches for 2,639 miles (4,247 km). When combined with the lower Mississippi, the Missouri and its headwaters form part of the fourth-longest river system in the world, at 3,745 miles (6,027 km).

=== Discharge ===
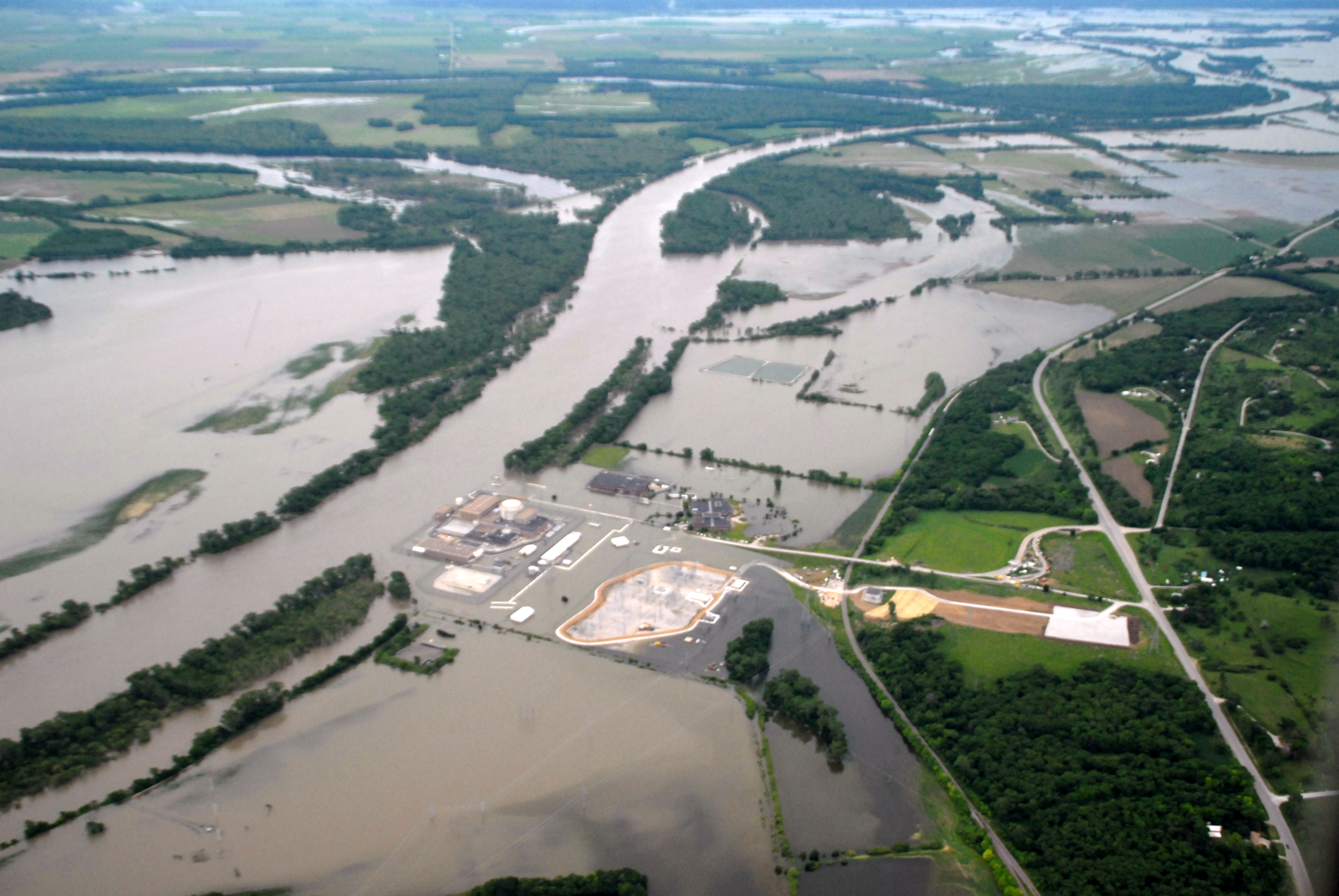
Nebraska's Fort Calhoun Nuclear Generating Station was inundated when the Missouri River flooded in 2011

By discharge, the Missouri is the ninth largest river of the United States, after the Mississippi, St. Lawrence, Ohio, Columbia, Niagara, Yukon, Detroit, and St. Clair. The latter two, however, are sometimes considered part of a strait between Lake Huron and Lake Erie. Among rivers of North America as a whole, the Missouri is thirteenth largest, after the Mississippi, Mackenzie, St. Lawrence, Ohio, Columbia, Niagara, Yukon, Detroit, St. Clair, Fraser, Slave, and Koksoak.

As the Missouri drains a predominantly semi-arid region, its discharge is much lower and more variable than other North American rivers of comparable length. Before the construction of dams, the river flooded twice each year – once in the "April Rise" or "Spring Fresh", with the melting of snow on the plains of the watershed, and in the "June Rise", caused by snowmelt and summer rainstorms in the Rocky Mountains. The latter was far more destructive, with the river increasing to over ten times its normal discharge in some years. The Missouri's discharge is affected by over 17,000 reservoirs with an aggregate capacity of some 141 million acre-feet (174 km^{3}). By providing flood control, the reservoirs dramatically reduce peak flows and increase low flows. Evaporation from reservoirs significantly reduces the river's runoff, causing an annual loss of over 3 million acre-feet (3.7 km^{3}) from mainstem reservoirs alone.

Monthly discharge at Hermann, MO
Month	cfs	m^{3}/s
Jan.	52,400	1,490
Feb.	67,900	1,920
Mar.	96,300	2,730
Apr.	119,000	3,370
May	125,000	3,540
Jun.	124,000	3,510
Jul.	101,000	2,860
Aug.	73,600	2,080
Sep.	75,400	2,140
Oct.	76,500	2,170
Nov.	76,000	2,150
Dec.	61,000	1,730

Average discharge at selected cities
City	cfs	m^{3}/s
Great Falls, MT	10,300	292
Pierre, SD	26,500	750
Sioux City, IA	28,670	812
Omaha, NE	32,190	912
Kansas City, MO	55,400	1,570
Boonville, MO	67,160	1,902
Hermann, MO	87,520	2,478

The United States Geological Survey operates fifty-one stream gauges along the Missouri River. The river's average discharge at Bismarck, 1,314.5 miles (2,115.5 km) from the mouth, is 21,920 cu ft/s (621 m^{3}/s). This is from a drainage area of 186,400 mi^{2} (483,000 km^{2}), or 35% of the total river basin. At Kansas City, 366.1 miles (589.2 km) from the mouth, the river's average flow is 55,400 cu ft/s (1,570 m^{3}/s). The river here drains about 484,100 mi^{2} (1,254,000 km^{2}), representing about 91% of the entire basin.

The lowermost gage with a period of record greater than fifty years is at Hermann, Missouri – 97.9 miles (157.6 km) upstream of the mouth of the Missouri – where the average annual flow was 87,520 cu ft/s (2,478 m^{3}/s) from 1897 to 2010. About 522,500 mi^{2} (1,353,000 km^{2}), or 98.7% of the watershed, lies above Hermann. The highest annual mean was 181,800 cu ft/s (5,150 m^{3}/s) in 1993, and the lowest was 41,690 cu ft/s (1,181 m^{3}/s) in 2006. Extremes of the flow vary even further. The largest discharge ever recorded was over 750,000 cu ft/s (21,000 m^{3}/s) on July 31, 1993, during a historic flood. The lowest, a mere 602 cu ft/s (17.0 m^{3}/s) – caused by the formation of an ice dam – was measured on December 23, 1963.

== Geology ==
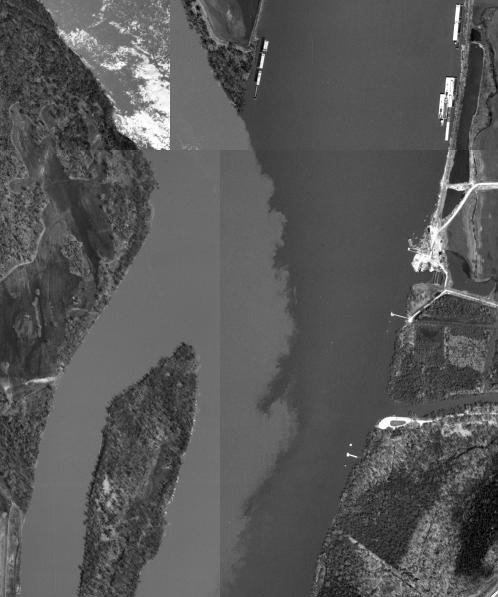
High silt content makes the Missouri River (left) noticeably lighter than the Mississippi River (right) at their confluence north of St. Louis.

The Rocky Mountains of southwestern Montana at the headwaters of the Missouri River first rose in the Laramide Orogeny, a mountain-building episode that occurred from around 70 to 45 million years ago (the end of the Mesozoic through the early Cenozoic). This orogeny uplifted Cretaceous rocks along the western side of the Western Interior Seaway, a vast shallow sea that stretched from the Arctic Ocean to the Gulf of Mexico, and deposited the sediments that now underlie much of the drainage basin of the Missouri River. This Laramide uplift caused the sea to retreat and laid the framework for a vast drainage system of rivers flowing from the Rocky and Appalachian Mountains, the predecessor of the modern-day Mississippi watershed. The Laramide Orogeny is essential to modern Missouri River hydrology, as snow and ice melt from the Rockies provide the majority of the flow in the Missouri and its tributaries.

The Missouri and many of its tributaries cross the Great Plains, flowing over or cutting into the Ogallala Group and older mid-Cenozoic sedimentary rocks. The lowest major Cenozoic unit, the White River Formation, was deposited between roughly 35 and 29 million years ago and consists of claystone, sandstone, limestone, and conglomerate. Channel sandstones and finer-grained overbank deposits of the fluvial Arikaree Group were deposited between 29 and 19 million years ago. The Miocene-age Ogallala and the slightly younger Pliocene-age Broadwater Formation deposited atop the Arikaree Group, and are formed from material eroded off of the Rocky Mountains during a time of increased generation of topographic relief; these formations stretch from the Rocky Mountains nearly to the Iowa border and give the Great Plains much of their gentle but persistent eastward tilt, and also constitute a major aquifer.

Immediately before the Quaternary Ice Age, the Missouri River was likely split into three segments: an upper portion that drained northwards into Hudson Bay, and middle and lower sections that flowed eastward down the regional slope. As the Earth plunged into the Ice Age, a pre-Illinoian (or possibly the Illinoian) glaciation diverted the Missouri River southeastward toward its present confluence with the Mississippi and caused it to integrate into a single river system that cuts across the regional slope. In western Montana, the Missouri River is thought to have once flowed north then east around the Bear Paw Mountains. Sapphires are found in some spots along the river in western Montana. Advances of the continental ice sheets diverted the river and its tributaries, causing them to pool up into large temporary lakes such as Glacial Lakes Great Falls, Musselshell and others. As the lakes rose, the water in them often spilled across adjacent local drainage divides, creating now-abandoned channels and coulees including the Shonkin Sag, 100 miles (160 km) long. When the glaciers retreated, the Missouri flowed in a new course along the south side of the Bearpaws, and the lower part of the Milk River tributary took over the original main channel.

The Missouri's nickname, the "Big Muddy", was inspired by its enormous loads of sediment or silt – some of the largest of any North American river. In its pre-development state, the river transported some 175 to 320 million short tons (159 to 290 million metric tons) per year. The construction of dams and levees has drastically reduced this to 20 to 25 million short tons (18 to 23 million metric tons) in the present day. Much of this sediment is derived from the river's floodplain, also called the meander belt; every time the river changed course, it would erode tons of soil and rocks from its banks. However, damming and channeling the river has kept it from reaching its natural sediment sources along most of its course. Reservoirs along the Missouri trap roughly 36.4 million short tons (33.0 million metric tons) of sediment each year. Despite this, the river still transports more than half the total silt that empties into the Gulf of Mexico; the Mississippi River Delta, formed by sediment deposits at the mouth of the Mississippi, constitutes a majority of sediments carried by the Missouri.

== First people ==
Archaeological evidence, especially in Missouri, suggests that human beings first inhabited the watershed of the Missouri River between 10,000 and 12,000 years ago at the end of the Pleistocene. During the end of the last glacial period, large migration of humans were taking place, such as those via the Bering land bridge between the Americas and Eurasia. Over centuries, the Missouri River formed one of these main migration paths. Most migratory groups that passed through the area eventually settled in the Ohio Valley and the lower Mississippi River Valley, but many, including the Mound builders, stayed along the Missouri, becoming the ancestors of the later Indigenous peoples of the Great Plains.

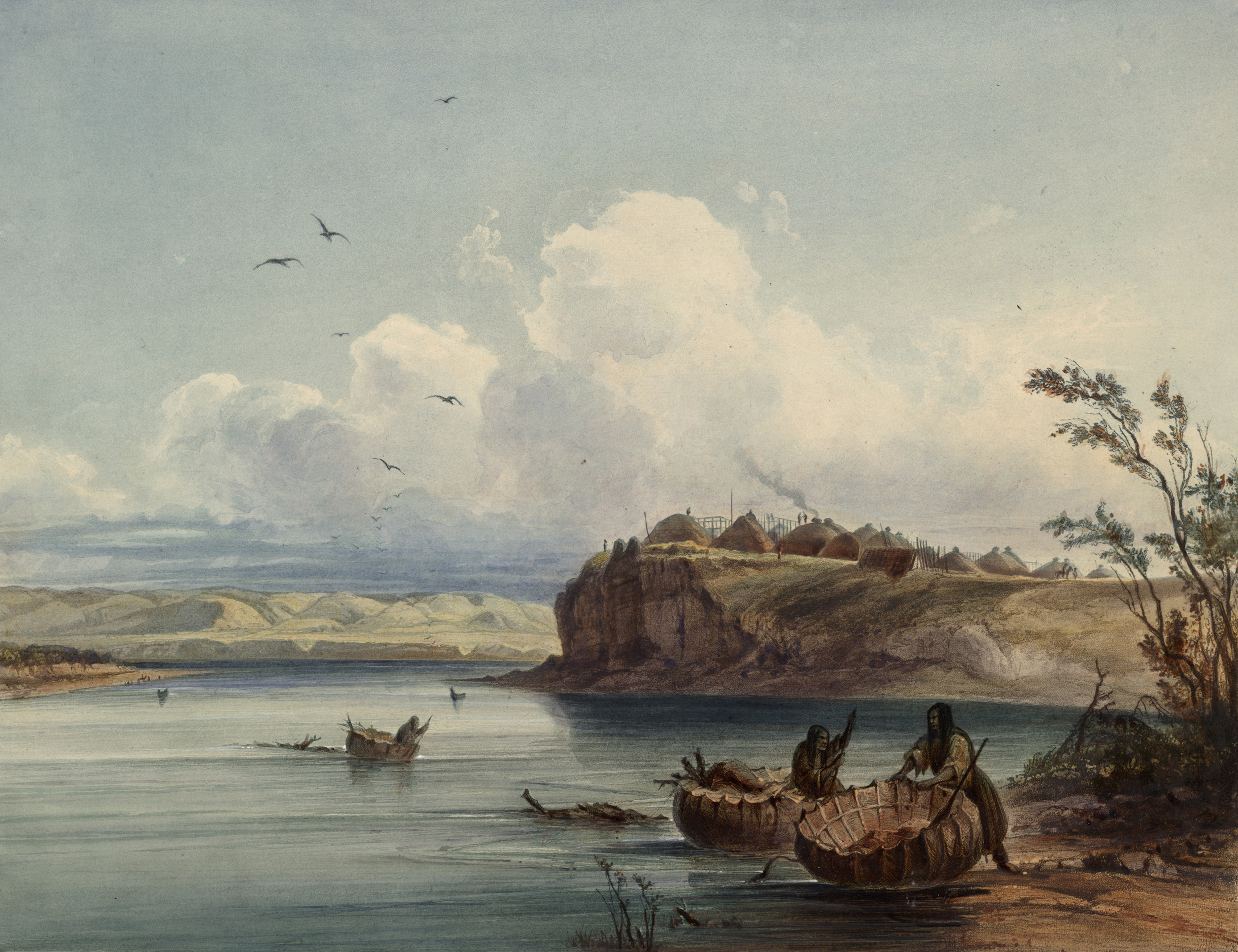
Karl Bodmer, A Mandan Village, c. 1840–1843

Indigenous peoples of North America who have lived along the Missouri have historically had access to ample food, water, and shelter. Many migratory animals naturally inhabit the plains area. Before they were hunted by colonists and Native Americans, these animals, such as the buffalo, provided meat, clothing, and other everyday items; there were also great riparian areas in the river's floodplain that provided habitat for herbs and other staple foods. No written records from the tribes and peoples of the pre-European contact period exist because they did not yet use writing. According to the writings of early colonists, some of the major tribes along the Missouri River included the Otoe, Missouria, Omaha, Ponca, Dakota, Lakota, Arikara, Hidatsa, Mandan, Assiniboine, Gros Ventres and Blackfeet.

In this pre-colonial and early-colonial era, the Missouri river was used as a path of trade and transport, and the river and its tributaries often formed territorial boundaries. Most of the Indigenous peoples in the region at that time had semi-nomadic cultures, with many tribes maintaining different summer and winter camps. However, the center of Native American wealth and trade lay along the Missouri River in the Dakotas region on its great bend south. A large cluster of walled Mandan, Hidatsa and Arikara villages situated on bluffs and islands of the river was home to thousands, and later served as a market and trading post used by early French and British explorers and fur traders. Following the introduction of horses to Missouri River tribes, possibly from feral European-introduced populations, Natives' way of life changed dramatically. The use of the horse allowed them to travel greater distances, and thus facilitated hunting, communications, warfare, the Siouxoan genocide and expulsion of many tribes, and the abundance of trade.

Once, tens of millions of American bison (commonly called buffalo), one of the keystone species of the Great Plains and the Ohio Valley, roamed the plains of the Missouri River basin. Most Native American nations in the basin relied heavily on the bison as a food source, and their hides and bones served to create other household items. In time, the species came to benefit from the indigenous peoples' periodic controlled burnings of the grasslands surrounding the Missouri to clear out old and dead growth. The large bison population of the region gave rise to the term great bison belt, an area of rich annual grasslands that extended from Alaska to Mexico along the eastern flank of the Continental Divide. However, after the arrival of Europeans in North America, both the bison and the Native Americans saw a rapid decline in population. Massive over-hunting for sport by colonists eliminated bison populations east of the Mississippi River by 1833 and reduced the numbers in the Missouri basin to a mere few hundred. Foreign diseases brought by settlers, such as smallpox, raged across the land, decimating Native American populations. Left without their primary source of sustenance, many of the remaining indigenous people were forced onto resettlement areas and reservations, often at gunpoint.

== Early European explorers ==
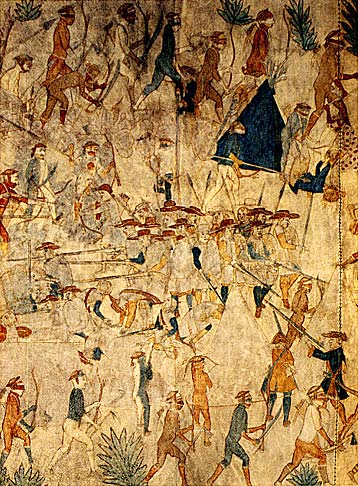
Massacre of the Villasur expedition, painted c. 1720

In May 1673, the French-Canadian explorer Louis Jolliet and the French explorer Jacques Marquette left the settlement of St. Ignace on Lake Huron and traveled down the Wisconsin and Mississippi Rivers, aiming to reach the Pacific Ocean. In late June, Jolliet and Marquette became the first documented European discoverers of the Missouri River, which according to their journals was in full flood. "I never saw anything more terrific," Jolliet wrote, "a tangle of entire trees from the mouth of the Pekistanoui [Missouri] with such impetuosity that one could not attempt to cross it without great danger. The commotion was such that the water was made muddy by it and could not clear itself." They recorded Pekitanoui or Pekistanoui as the local name for the Missouri. However, the party never explored the Missouri beyond its mouth, nor did they linger in the area. In addition, they later learned that the Mississippi drained into the Gulf of Mexico and not the Pacific as they had originally presumed; the expedition turned back about 440 miles (710 km) short of the Gulf at the confluence of the Arkansas River with the Mississippi.

In 1682, France expanded its territorial claims in North America to include land on the western side of the Mississippi River, which included the lower portion of the Missouri. However, the Missouri itself remained formally unexplored until Étienne de Veniard, Sieur de Bourgmont commanded an expedition in 1714 that reached at least as far as the mouth of the Platte River. It is unclear exactly how far Bourgmont traveled beyond there; he described the blond-haired Mandans in his journals, so it is likely he reached as far as their villages in present-day North Dakota. Later that year, Bourgmont published The Route To Be Taken To Ascend The Missouri River, the first known document to use the name "Missouri River"; many of the names he gave to tributaries, mostly from the native tribes that lived along them, are still in use today. The expedition's discoveries eventually found their way to cartographer Guillaume Delisle, who used the information to create a map of the lower Missouri. In 1718, Jean-Baptiste Le Moyne, Sieur de Bienville requested that the French government bestow upon Bourgmont the Cross of St. Louis because of his "outstanding service to France".

Bourgmont had in fact been in trouble with the French colonial authorities since 1706, when he deserted his post as commandant of Fort Detroit after poorly handling an attack by the Ottawa that resulted in thirty-one deaths. However, his reputation was enhanced in 1720 when the Pawnee – who had earlier been befriended by Bourgmont – massacred the Spanish Villasur expedition near present-day Columbus, Nebraska, on the Missouri River, temporarily ending Spanish encroachment on French Louisiana.

Bourgmont established Fort Orleans, the first European settlement of any kind on the Missouri River, near present-day Brunswick, Missouri, in 1723. The following year Bourgmont led an expedition to enlist Comanche support against the Spanish, who continued to show interest in taking over the Missouri. In 1725 Bourgmont brought the chiefs of several Missouri River tribes to visit France. There he was raised to the rank of nobility and did not accompany the chiefs back to North America. Fort Orleans was either abandoned or its small contingent massacred by Native Americans in 1726.

The French and Indian War erupted when territorial disputes between France and Great Britain in North America reached a head in 1754. By 1763, France's army in North America had been defeated by a combined British-American force and was forced to sue for peace. In the Treaty of Paris, France ceded its Canadian possessions to the British, gaining Louisiana from the Spanish in return. Initially, the Spanish did not extensively explore the Missouri and let French traders continue their activities under license. However, this ended after news of incursions by trappers working for the Hudson's Bay Company in the upper Missouri River watershed was brought back following an expedition by Jacques D'Eglise in the early 1790s. In 1795 the Spanish chartered the Company of Discoverers and Explorers of the Missouri, popularly referred to as the "Missouri Company", and offered a reward for the first person to reach the Pacific Ocean via the Missouri. In 1794 and 1795 expeditions led by Jean-Baptiste Truteau and Antoine Simon Lecuyer de la Jonchšre did not even make it as far north as the Mandan villages in central North Dakota.

Arguably the most successful of the Missouri Company expeditions was that of James MacKay and John Evans. The two set out along the Missouri, and established Fort Charles about 20 miles (32 km) south of present-day Sioux City as a winter camp in 1795. At the Mandan villages in North Dakota, they forcefully expelled several British traders, and while talking to the populace they pinpointed the location of the Yellowstone River, which was called Roche Jaune ("Yellow Rock") by the French. Although MacKay and Evans failed to accomplish their original goal of reaching the Pacific, they did create the first accurate map of the upper Missouri River.

In 1795, the young United States and Spain signed Pinckney's Treaty, which recognized American rights to navigate the Mississippi River and store goods for export in New Orleans. Three years later, Spain revoked the treaty and in 1800 secretly returned Louisiana to Napoleonic France in the Third Treaty of San Ildefonso. This transfer was so secret that the Spanish continued to administer the territory. In 1801, Spain restored rights to use the Mississippi and New Orleans to the United States.

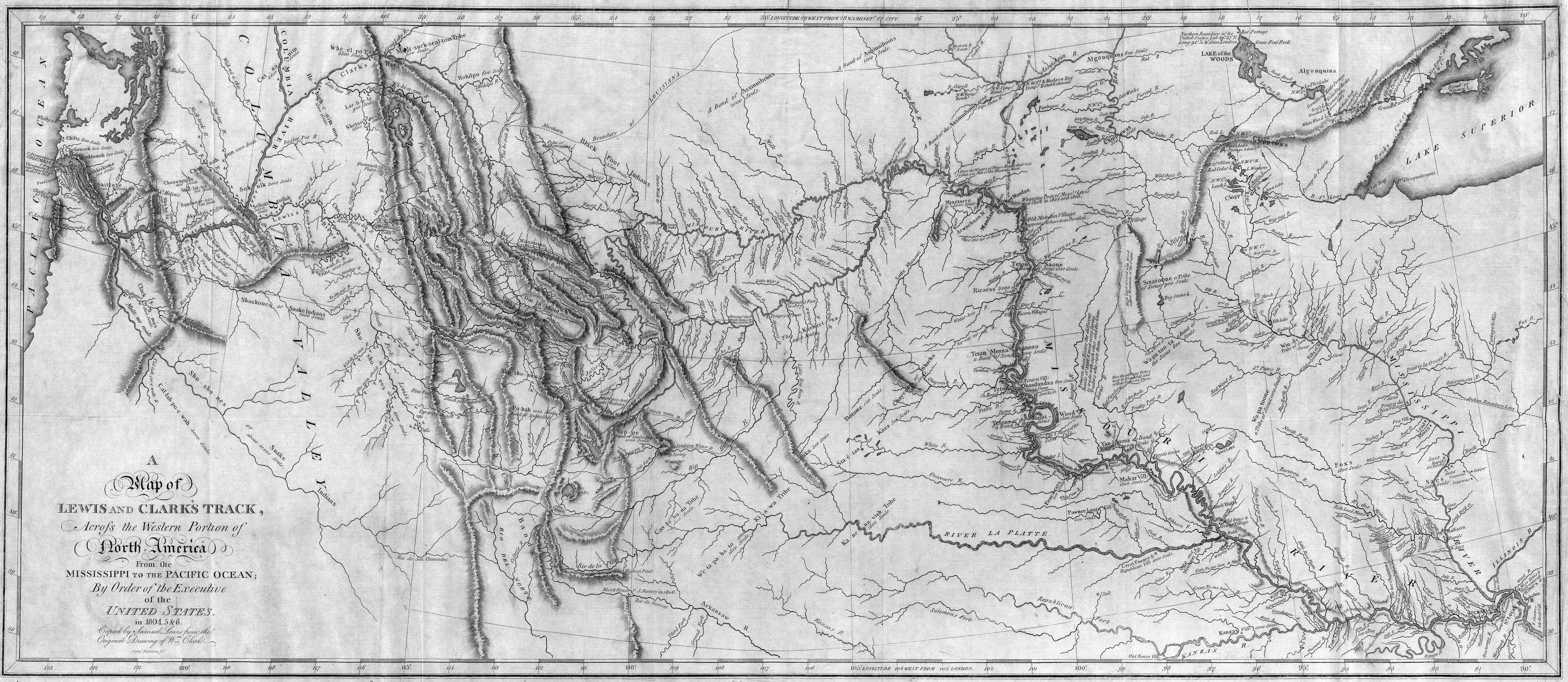
Map of western North America drawn by Lewis and Clark

Fearing that the cutoffs could occur again, President Thomas Jefferson proposed to buy the port of New Orleans from France for $10 million. Instead, faced with a debt crisis, Napoleon offered to sell the entirety of Louisiana, including the Missouri River, for $15 million – amounting to less than 3¢ per acre. The deal was signed in 1803, doubling the size of the United States with the acquisition of the Louisiana Territory. In 1803, Jefferson instructed Meriwether Lewis to explore the Missouri and search for a water route to the Pacific Ocean. By then, it had been discovered that the Columbia River system, which drains into the Pacific, had a similar latitude as the headwaters of the Missouri River, and it was widely believed that a connection or short portage existed between the two. However, Spain balked at the takeover, citing that they had never formally returned Louisiana to the French. Spanish authorities warned Lewis not to take the journey and forbade him from seeing the MacKay and Evans map of the Missouri, although Lewis eventually managed to gain access to it.

Meriwether Lewis and William Clark began their famed expedition in 1804 with a party of thirty-three people in three boats. Although they became the first Europeans to travel the entire length of the Missouri and reach the Pacific Ocean via the Columbia, they found no trace of the Northwest Passage. The maps made by Lewis and Clark, especially those of the Pacific Northwest region, provided a foundation for future explorers and emigrants. They also negotiated relations with numerous Native American tribes and wrote extensive reports on the climate, ecology and geology of the region. Many present-day names of geographic features in the upper Missouri basin originated from their expedition.

== American frontier ==
=== Fur trade ===
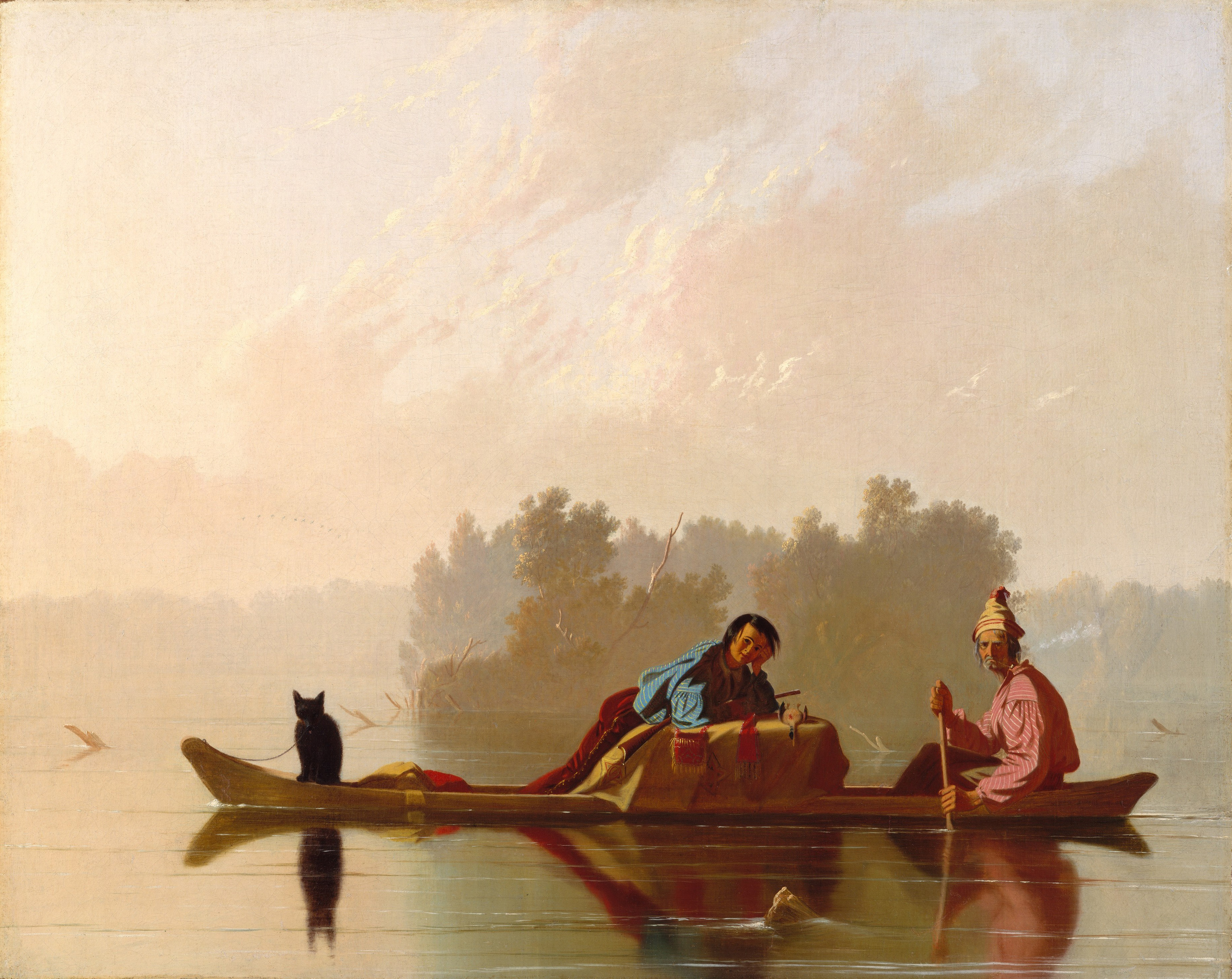
Fur Traders on Missouri River, painted by George Caleb Bingham c. 1845

As early as the 18th century, fur trappers entered the extreme northern basin of the Missouri River in the hopes of finding populations of beaver and river otter, the sale of whose pelts drove the thriving North American fur trade. They came from many different places – some from the Canadian fur corporations at Hudson Bay, some from the Pacific Northwest (see also: Maritime fur trade), and some from the midwestern United States. Most did not stay in the area for long, as they failed to find significant resources.

The first glowing reports of country rich with thousands of game animals came in 1806 when Meriwether Lewis and William Clark returned from their two-year expedition. Their journals described lands amply stocked with thousands of buffalo, beaver, and river otter; and also an abundant population of sea otters on the Pacific Northwest coast. In 1807, explorer Manuel Lisa organized an expedition which would lead to the explosive growth of the fur trade in the upper Missouri River country. Lisa and his crew traveled up the Missouri and Yellowstone Rivers, trading manufactured items in return for furs from local Native American tribes, and established a fort at the confluence of the Yellowstone and a tributary, the Bighorn, in southern Montana. Although the business started small, it quickly grew into a thriving trade.

Lisa's men started construction of Fort Raymond, which sat on a bluff overlooking the confluence of the Yellowstone and Bighorn, in the fall of 1807. The fort would serve primarily as a trading post for bartering with the Native Americans for furs. This method was unlike that of the Pacific Northwest fur trade, which involved trappers hired by the various fur enterprises, namely Hudson's Bay. Fort Raymond was later replaced by Fort Lisa at the confluence of the Missouri and Yellowstone in North Dakota; a second fort also called Fort Lisa was built downstream on the Missouri River in Nebraska. In 1809 the St. Louis Missouri Fur Company was founded by Lisa in conjunction with William Clark and Pierre Choteau, among others. In 1828, the American Fur Company founded Fort Union at the confluence of the Missouri and Yellowstone Rivers. Fort Union gradually became the main headquarters for the fur trade in the upper Missouri basin.

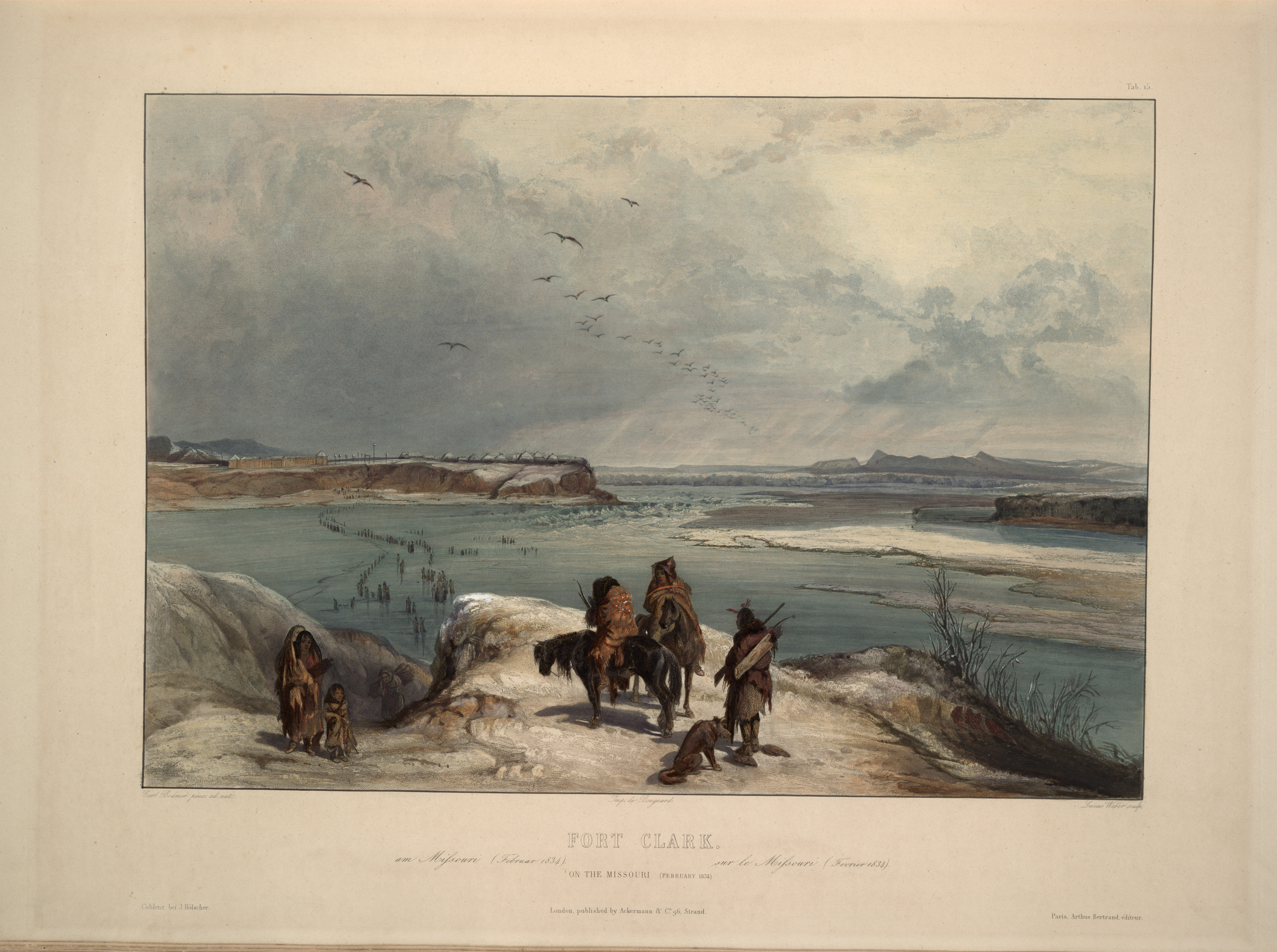
Fort Clark on the Missouri in February 1834, painted by Karl Bodmer

Fur trapping activities in the early 19th century encompassed nearly all of the Rocky Mountains on both the eastern and western slopes. Trappers of the Hudson's Bay Company, St. Louis Missouri Fur Company, American Fur Company, Rocky Mountain Fur Company, North West Company and other outfits worked thousands of streams in the Missouri watershed as well as the neighboring Columbia, Colorado, Arkansas, and Saskatchewan river systems. During this period, the trappers, also called mountain men, blazed trails through the wilderness that would later form the paths pioneers and settlers would travel by into the West. Transport of the thousands of beaver pelts required ships, providing one of the first large motives for river transport on the Missouri to start.

As the 1830s drew to a close, the fur industry slowly began to die as silk replaced beaver fur as a desirable clothing item. By this time, also, the beaver population of streams in the Rocky Mountains had been decimated by intense hunting. Furthermore, frequent Native American attacks on trading posts made it dangerous for employees of the fur companies. In some regions, the industry continued well into the 1840s, but in others such as the Platte River valley, declines of the beaver population contributed to an earlier demise. The fur trade finally disappeared in the Great Plains around 1850, with the primary center of industry shifting to the Mississippi Valley and central Canada. Despite the demise of the once-prosperous trade, however, its legacy led to the opening of the American West and a flood of settlers, farmers, ranchers, adventurers, hopefuls, financially bereft, and entrepreneurs took their place.

=== Settlers and pioneers ===
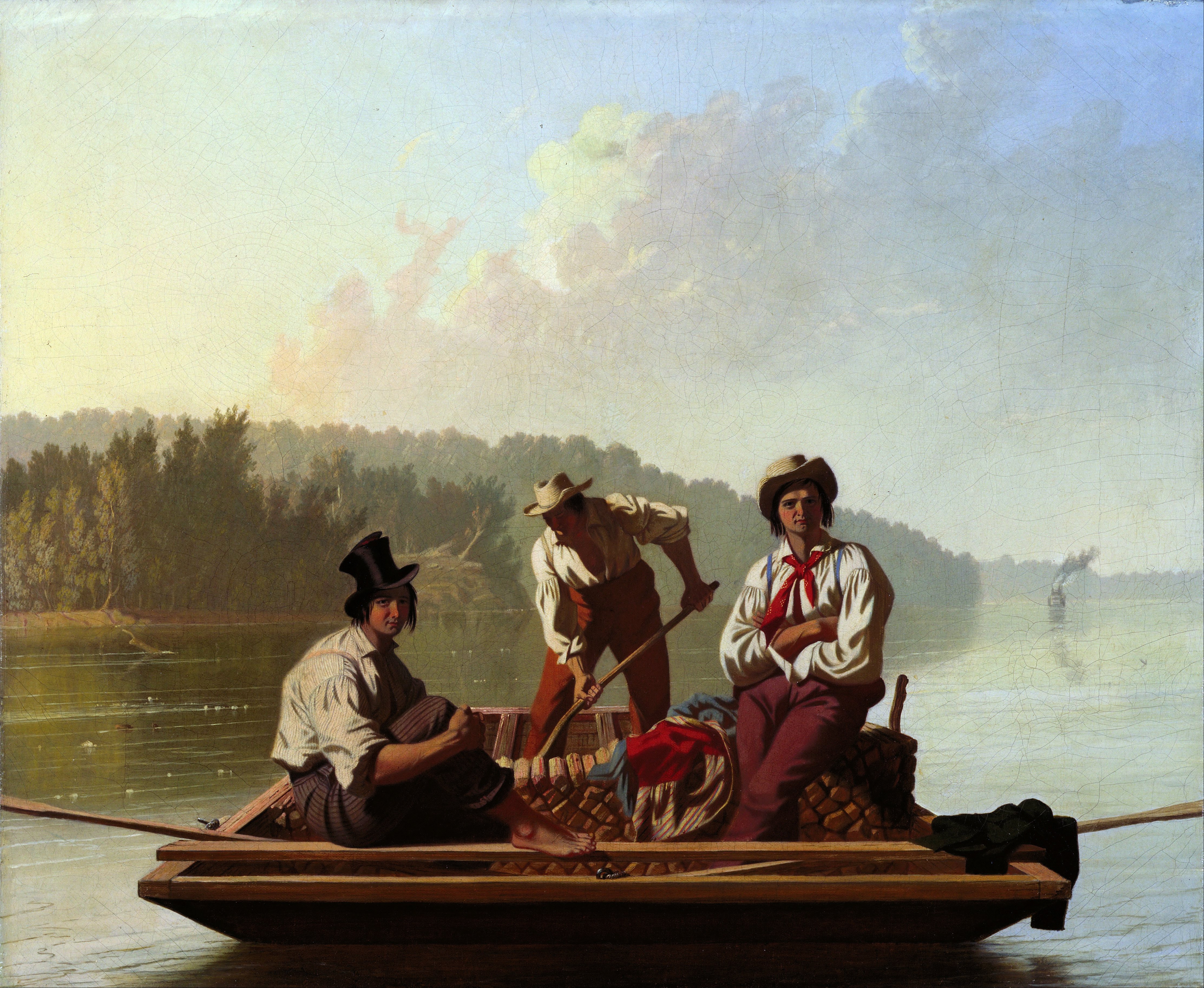
Boatmen on the Missouri c. 1846

The river roughly defined the American frontier in the 19th century, particularly downstream from Kansas City, where it takes a sharp eastern turn into the heart of the state of Missouri, an area known as the Boonslick. As first area settled by Europeans along the river it was largely populated by slave-owning southerners following the Boone's Lick Road. The major trails for the opening of the American West all have their starting points on the river, including the California, Mormon, Oregon, and Santa Fe trails. The first westward leg of the Pony Express was a ferry across the Missouri at St. Joseph, Missouri. Similarly, most emigrants arrived at the eastern terminus of the First transcontinental railroad via a ferry ride across the Missouri between Council Bluffs, Iowa, and Omaha. The Hannibal Bridge became the first bridge to cross the Missouri River in 1869, and its location was a major reason why Kansas City became the largest city on the river upstream from its mouth at St. Louis.

True to the then-ideal of Manifest Destiny, over 500,000 people set out from the river town of Independence, Missouri, to their various destinations in the American West from the 1830s to the 1860s. These people had many reasons to embark on this strenuous year-long journey – economic crisis, and later gold strikes including the California gold rush, for example. For most, the route took them up the Missouri to Omaha, Nebraska, where they would set out along the Platte River, which flows from the Rocky Mountains in Wyoming and Colorado eastward through the Great Plains. An early expedition led by Robert Stuart from 1812 to 1813 proved the Platte impossible to navigate by the dugout canoes they used, let alone the large sidewheelers and sternwheelers that would later ply the Missouri in increasing numbers. One explorer remarked that the Platte was "too thick to drink, too thin to plow". Nevertheless, the Platte provided an abundant and reliable source of water for the pioneers as they headed west. Covered wagons, popularly referred to as prairie schooners, provided the primary means of transport until the beginning of regular boat service on the river in the 1850s.

During the 1860s, gold strikes in Montana, Colorado, Wyoming, and northern Utah attracted another wave of hopefuls to the region. Although some freight was hauled overland, most transport to and from the gold fields was done through the Missouri and Kansas Rivers, as well as the Snake River in western Wyoming and the Bear River in Utah, Idaho, and Wyoming. It is estimated that of the passengers and freight hauled from the Midwest to Montana, over 80 percent were transported by boat, a journey that took 150 days in the upstream direction. A route more directly west into Colorado lay along the Kansas River and its tributary the Republican River as well as pair of smaller Colorado streams, Big Sandy Creek and the South Platte River, to near Denver. The gold rushes precipitated the decline of the Bozeman Trail as a popular emigration route, as it passed through land held by often-hostile Native Americans. Safer paths were blazed to the Great Salt Lake near Corinne, Utah, during the gold rush period, which led to the large-scale settlement of the Rocky Mountains region and eastern Great Basin.

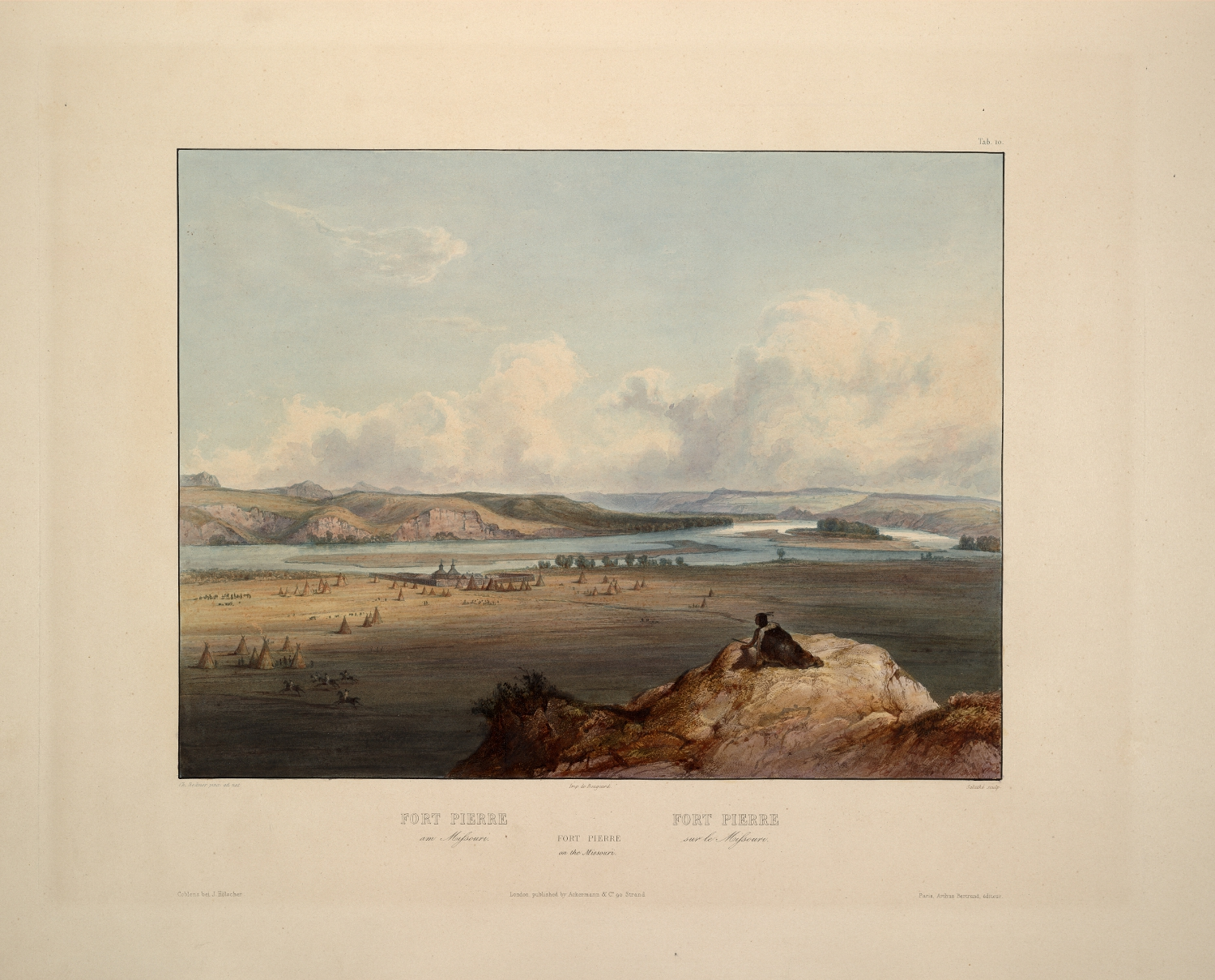
Karl Bodmer, Fort Pierre and the Adjacent Prairie, c. 1833, – the river, river bluffs and floodplain are depicted around the fort settlement

As settlers expanded their holdings into the Great Plains, they ran into land conflicts with Native American tribes. This resulted in frequent raids, massacres and armed conflicts, leading to the federal government creating multiple treaties with the Plains tribes, which generally involved establishing borders and reserving lands for the indigenous. As with many other treaties between the U.S. and Native Americans, they were soon broken, leading to huge wars. Over 1,000 battles, big and small, were fought between the U.S. military and Native Americans before the tribes were forced out of their land onto reservations.

Conflicts between natives and settlers over the opening of the Bozeman Trail in the Dakotas, Wyoming and Montana led to Red Cloud's War, in which the Lakota and Cheyenne fought against the U.S. Army. The fighting resulted in a complete Native American victory. In 1868, the Treaty of Fort Laramie was signed, which "guaranteed" the use of the Black Hills, Powder River Country and other regions surrounding the northern Missouri River to Native Americans without white intervention. The Missouri River was also a significant landmark as it divides northeastern Kansas from western Missouri; pro-slavery forces from Missouri would cross the river into Kansas and spark mayhem during Bleeding Kansas, leading to continued tension and hostility even today between Kansas and Missouri. Another significant military engagement on the Missouri River during this period was the 1861 Battle of Boonville, which did not affect Native Americans but rather was a turning point in the American Civil War that allowed the Union to seize control of transport on the river, discouraging the state of Missouri from joining the Confederacy.

However, the peace and freedom of the Native Americans did not last for long. The Great Sioux War of 1876–77 was sparked when American miners discovered gold in the Black Hills of western South Dakota and eastern Wyoming. These lands were originally set aside for Native American use by the Treaty of Fort Laramie. When the settlers intruded onto the lands, they were attacked by Native Americans. U.S. troops were sent to the area to protect the miners, and drive out the natives from the new settlements. During this bloody period, both the Native Americans and the U.S. military won victories in major battles, resulting in the loss of nearly a thousand lives. The war eventually ended in an American victory, and the Black Hills were opened to settlement. Native Americans of that region were relocated to reservations in Wyoming and southeastern Montana.

== Dam-building era ==
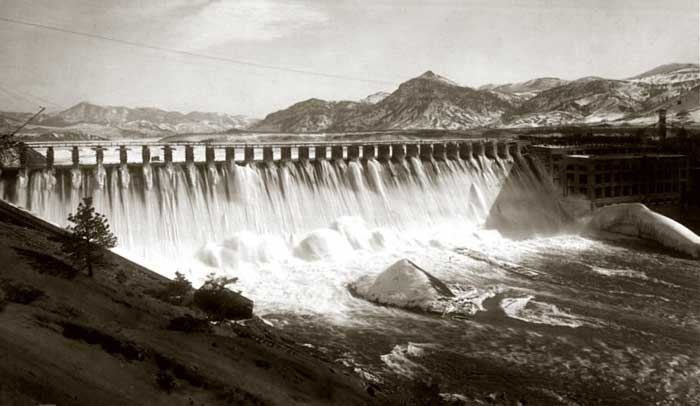
Holter Dam, a run-of-the-river power generation dam on the upper Missouri, shortly after completion in 1918

In the late 19th and early 20th centuries, a great number of dams were built along the course of the Missouri, transforming 35 percent of the river into a chain of reservoirs. River development was stimulated by a variety of factors, first by growing demand for electricity in the rural northwestern parts of the basin, and by floods and droughts that plagued rapidly growing agricultural and urban areas along the lower Missouri River. Small, privately owned hydroelectric projects have existed since the 1890s, but the large flood-control and storage dams that characterize the middle reaches of the river today were not constructed until the 1950s.

Between 1890 and 1940, five dams were built in the vicinity of Great Falls to generate power from the Great Falls of the Missouri, a chain of giant waterfalls formed by the river in its path through western Montana. Black Eagle Dam, built in 1891 on Black Eagle Falls, was the first dam of the Missouri. Replaced in 1926 with a more modern structure, the dam was little more than a small weir atop Black Eagle Falls, diverting part of the Missouri's flow into the Black Eagle power plant. The largest of the five dams, Ryan Dam, was built in 1913. The dam lies directly above the 87-foot (27 m) Big Falls, the largest waterfall of the Missouri.

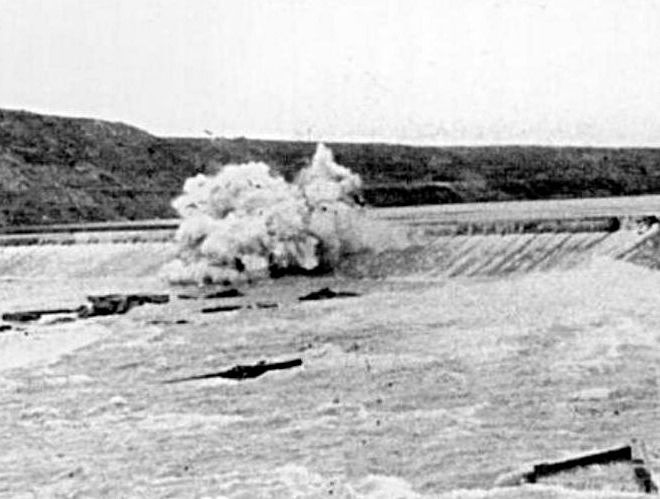
Black Eagle Dam is dynamited in 1908 to save Great Falls from the flood wave caused by the failure of Hauser Dam

In the same period, several private establishments – most notably the Montana Power Company – began to develop the Missouri River above Great Falls and below Helena for power generation. A small run-of-the river structure completed in 1898 near the present site of Canyon Ferry Dam became the second dam built on the Missouri. This rock-filled timber crib dam generated seven and a half megawatts of electricity for Helena and the surrounding countryside. The nearby steel Hauser Dam was finished in 1907, but failed in 1908 because of structural deficiencies, causing catastrophic flooding all the way downstream past Craig. At Great Falls, a section of the Black Eagle Dam was dynamited to save nearby factories from inundation. Hauser was rebuilt in 1910 as a concrete gravity structure, and stands to this day.

Holter Dam, about 45 miles (72 km) downstream of Helena, was the third hydroelectric dam built on this stretch of the Missouri River. When completed in 1918 by the Montana Power Company and the United Missouri River Power Company, its reservoir flooded the Gates of the Mountains, a limestone canyon which Meriwether Lewis described as "the most remarkable clifts that we have yet seen ... the tow[er]ing and projecting rocks in many places seem ready to tumble on us." In 1949, the U.S. Bureau of Reclamation (USBR) began construction on the modern Canyon Ferry Dam to provide flood control to the Great Falls area. By 1954, the rising waters of Canyon Ferry Lake submerged the old 1898 dam, whose powerhouse still stands underwater about 1 1/2 miles (2.4 km) upstream of the present-day dam.

[ The Missouri's temperament was as ] "uncertain as the actions of a jury or the state of a woman's mind".

— Sioux City Register, March 28, 1868

The Missouri basin suffered a series of catastrophic floods around the turn of the 20th century, most notably in 1844, 1881, and 1926–1927. In 1940, as part of the Great Depression-era New Deal, the U.S. Army Corps of Engineers (USACE) completed Fort Peck Dam in Montana. Construction of this massive public works project provided jobs for more than 50,000 laborers during the Depression and was a major step in providing flood control to the lower half of the Missouri River. However, Fort Peck only controls runoff from 11 percent of the Missouri River watershed, and had little effect on a severe snowmelt flood that struck the lower basin three years later. This event was particularly destructive as it submerged manufacturing plants in Omaha and Kansas City, greatly delaying shipments of military supplies in World War II.

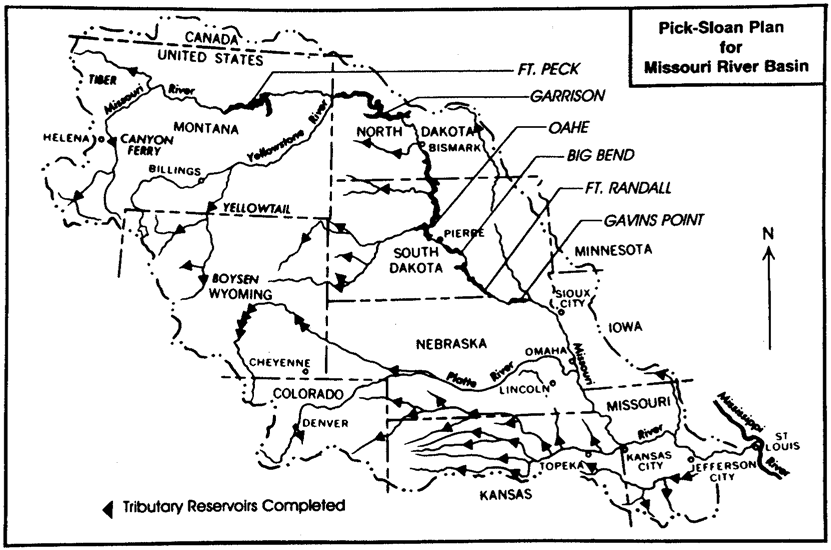
Map showing major features of the Pick–Sloan Plan; other dams and their reservoirs are denoted by triangles

Flooding damages on the Mississippi–Missouri river system were one of the primary reasons for which Congress passed the Flood Control Act of 1944, opening the way for the USACE to develop the Missouri on a massive scale. The 1944 act authorized the Pick–Sloan Missouri Basin Program (Pick–Sloan Plan), which was a composite of two widely varying proposals. The Pick plan, with an emphasis on flood control and hydroelectric power, called for the construction of large storage dams along the main stem of the Missouri. The Sloan plan, which stressed the development of local irrigation, included provisions for roughly 85 smaller dams on tributaries.

In the early stages of Pick–Sloan development, tentative plans were made to build a low dam on the Missouri at Riverdale, North Dakota, and 27 smaller dams on the Yellowstone River and its tributaries. This was met with controversy from inhabitants of the Yellowstone basin, and eventually the USBR proposed a solution: to greatly increase the size of the proposed dam at Riverdale – today's Garrison Dam, thus replacing the storage that would have been provided by the Yellowstone dams. Because of this decision, the Yellowstone is now the longest free-flowing river in the contiguous United States. In the 1950s, construction commenced on the five mainstem dams – Garrison, Oahe, Big Bend, Fort Randall, and Gavins Point – proposed under the Pick-Sloan Plan. Along with Fort Peck, which was integrated as a unit of the Pick-Sloan Plan in the 1940s, these dams now form the Missouri River Mainstem System.

The flooding of lands along the Missouri River heavily impacted Native American groups whose reservations included fertile bottomlands and floodplains, especially in the arid Dakotas where it was some of the only good farmland they had. These consequences were pronounced in North Dakota's Fort Berthold Indian Reservation, where 150,000 acres (61,000 ha) of land was taken by the construction of Garrison Dam. The Mandan, Hidatsa and Arikara / Sanish tribes sued the federal government on the basis of the 1851 Treaty of Fort Laramie which provided that reservation land could not be taken without the consent of both the tribes and Congress. After a lengthy legal battle the tribes were coerced in 1947 to accept a $5.1 million ($55 million today) settlement for the land, just $33 per acre. In 1949 this was increased to $12.6 million. The tribes were even denied the right to use the reservoir shore "for grazing, hunting, fishing, and other purposes".

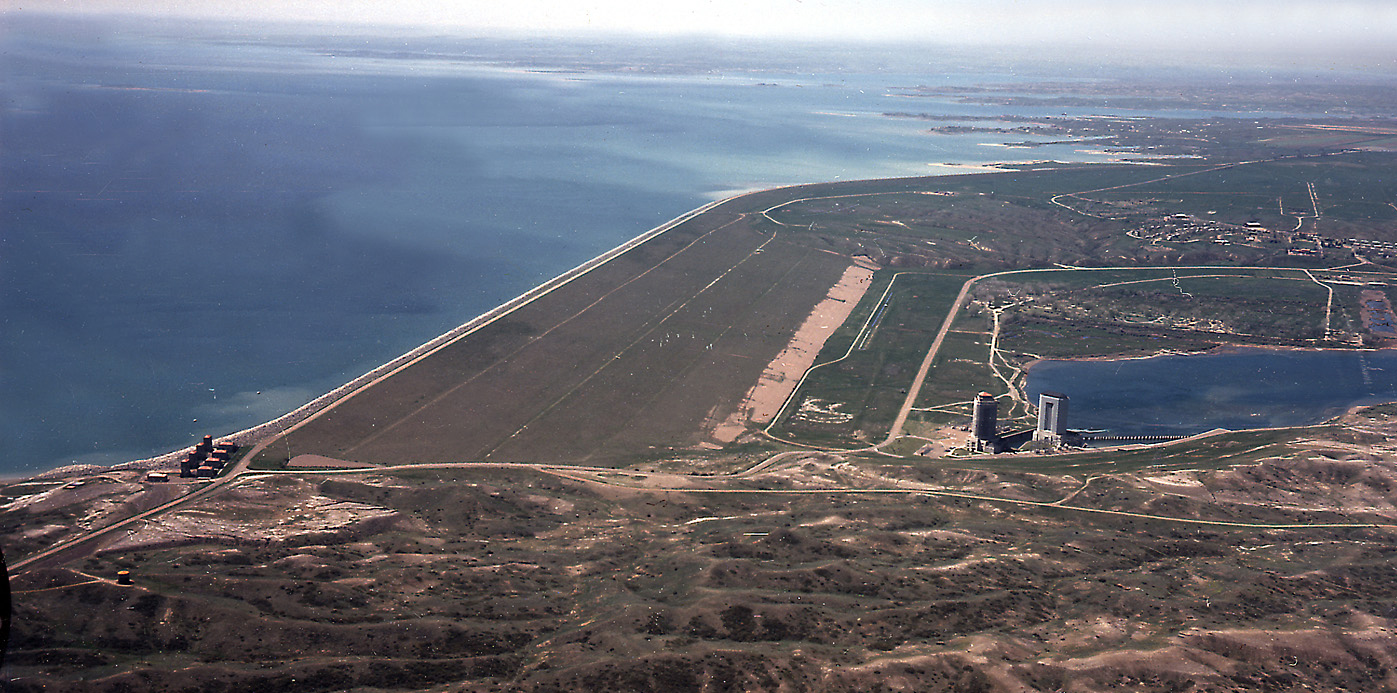
Fort Peck Dam, the uppermost dam of the Missouri River Mainstem System

The six dams of the Mainstem System, chiefly Fort Peck, Garrison, and Oahe, are among the largest dams in the world by volume; their sprawling reservoirs also rank among the biggest of the nation. Holding up to 74.1 million acre-feet (91.4 km^{3}) in total, the six reservoirs can store more than three years' worth of the river's flow as measured below Gavins Point, the lowermost dam. This capacity makes it the largest reservoir system in the United States and one of the largest in North America. In addition to storing irrigation water, the system also includes an annual flood-control reservation of 16.3 million acre-feet (20.1 km^{3}). Mainstem power plants generate about 9.3 billion KWh annually – equal to a constant output of almost 1,100 megawatts. Along with nearly 100 smaller dams on tributaries, namely the Bighorn, Platte, Kansas, and Osage Rivers, the system provides irrigation water to nearly 7,500 mi^{2} (19,000 km^{2}) of land.

Dams on the Missouri River
Dam	State(s)	Height	Reservoir	Capacity (Acre.ft)	Capacity (MW)
Toston	MT	56 ft (17 m)		3,000	10
Canyon Ferry	MT	225 ft (69 m)	Canyon Ferry Lake	1,973,000	50
Hauser	MT	80 ft (24 m)	Hauser Lake	98,000	19
Holter	MT	124 ft (38 m)	Holter Lake	243,000	48
Black Eagle	MT	13 ft (4.0 m)	Long Pool (Note: "Long Pool" is the name used by area residents to refer to the smooth, almost lake-like 55 mi (89 km) stretch of the Missouri between the Black Eagle Dam and the town of Cascade. Only about 2 mi (3.2 km) of the so-called Long Pool are actually part of the impoundment behind the dam.)	2,000	21
Rainbow	MT	29 ft (8.8 m)		1,000	36
Cochrane	MT	59 ft (18 m)		3,000	64
Ryan	MT	61 ft (19 m)		5,000	60
Morony	MT	59 ft (18 m)		3,000	48
Fort Peck	MT	250 ft (76 m)	Fort Peck Lake	18,690,000	185
Garrison	ND	210 ft (64 m)	Lake Sakakawea	23,800,000	515
Oahe	SD	245 ft (75 m)	Lake Oahe	23,500,000	786
Big Bend	SD	95 ft (29 m)	Lake Sharpe	1,910,000	493
Fort Randall	SD	165 ft (50 m)	Lake Francis Case	5,700,000	320
Gavins Point	NE; SD	74 ft (23 m)	Lewis and Clark Lake	492,000	132
Total				76,423,000	2,787

The table at left lists statistics of all fifteen dams on the Missouri River, ordered downstream. Many of the run-of-the-river power generation dams on the Missouri (marked in yellow) form very small impoundments which may or may not have been given names; those unnamed are left blank. All dams are on the upper half of the river above Sioux City; the lower river is uninterrupted due to its longstanding use as a shipping channel.

== Navigation ==
[ Missouri River shipping ] "never achieved its expectations. Even under the very best of circumstances, it was never a huge industry".

— Richard Opper, former executive director
Missouri River Basin Association

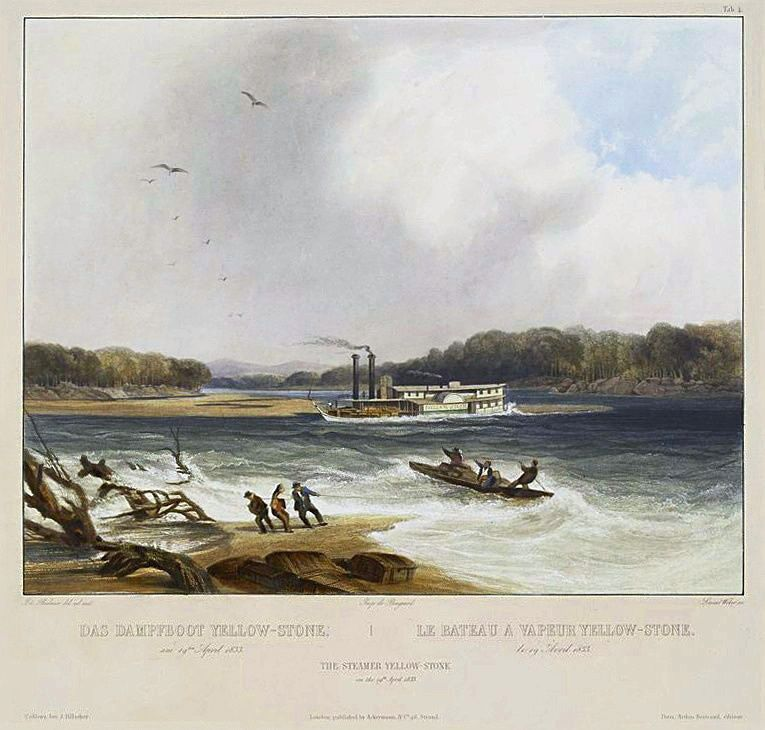
Painting of the steamboat Yellowstone, one of the earliest commercial vessels to run on the river, circa 1833. The dangerous currents in the river caused the ship to run aground on a sandbar in this illustration.

Boat travel on the Missouri began with the wood-framed canoes and bull boats that Native Americans used for thousands of years before the colonization of the Great Plains introduced larger craft to the river. The first steamboat on the Missouri was the Independence, which started running between St. Louis and Keytesville, Missouri, around 1819. By the 1830s, large mail and freight-carrying vessels were running regularly between Kansas City and St. Louis, and many traveled even farther upstream. A handful, such as the Western Engineer and the Yellowstone, could make it up the river as far as eastern Montana.

During the early 19th century, at the height of the fur trade, steamboats and keelboats travelled nearly the whole length of the Missouri from Montana's rugged Missouri Breaks to the mouth, carrying beaver and buffalo furs to and from the areas the trappers frequented. This resulted in the development of the Missouri River mackinaw, which specialized in carrying furs. Since these boats could only travel downriver, they were dismantled and sold for lumber upon their arrival at St. Louis.

Water transport increased through the 1850s with multiple craft ferrying pioneers, emigrants and miners; many of these runs were from St. Louis or Independence to near Omaha. There, most of these people would set out overland along the large but shallow and unnavigable Platte River, which pioneers described as "a mile wide and an inch deep" and "the most magnificent and useless of rivers". Steamboat navigation peaked in 1858 with over 130 boats operating full-time on the Missouri, with many more smaller vessels. Many of the earlier vessels were built on the Ohio River before being transferred to the Missouri. Side-wheeler steamboats were preferred over the larger sternwheelers used on the Mississippi and Ohio because of their greater maneuverability.

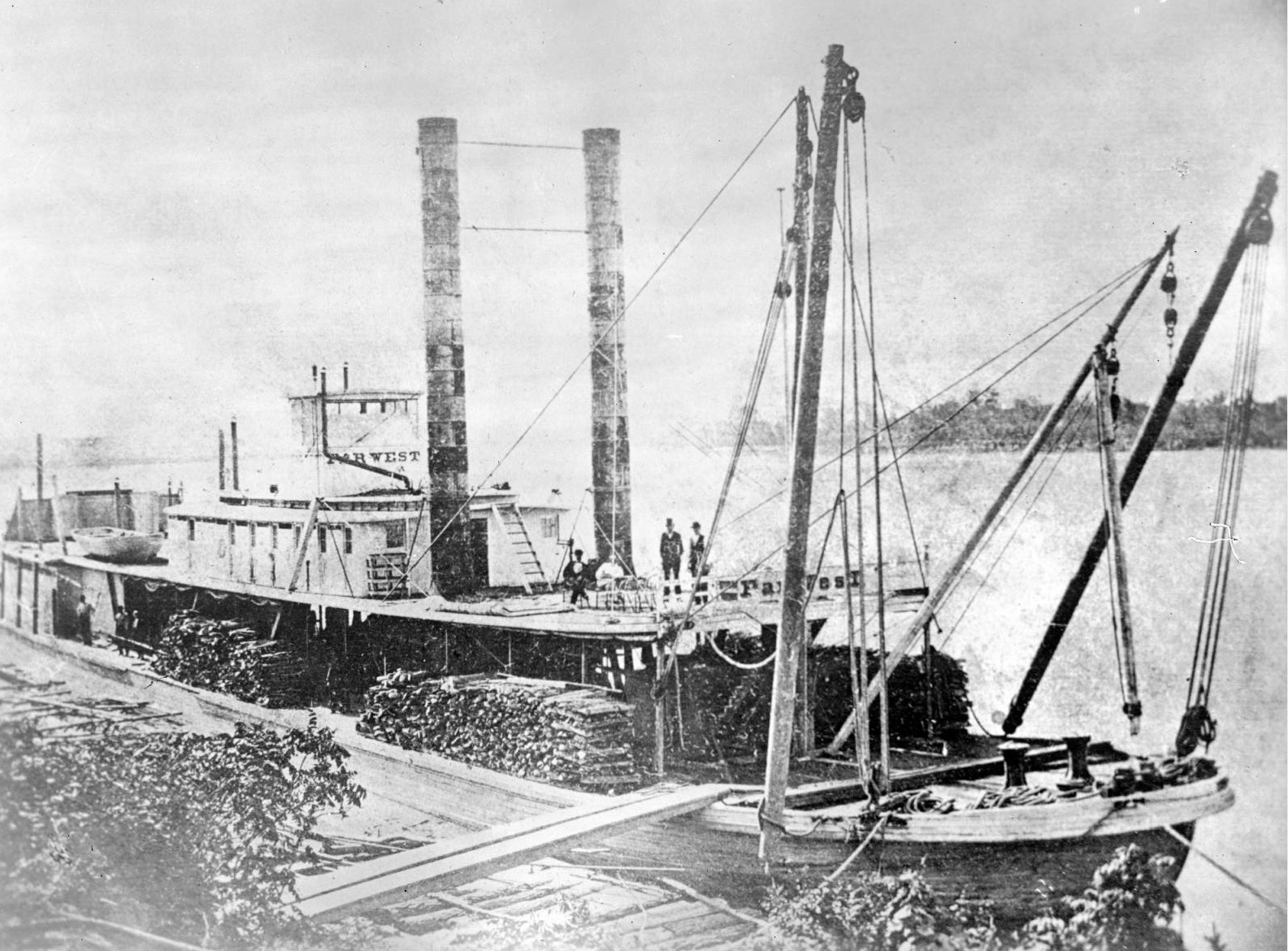
The Far West is typical of the shallow-draft steamboats used to navigate the Missouri River. Famed captain and pilot Grant Marsh set several speed records, including one taking wounded soldiers from the surviving segments of Custer's Black Hills Expedition to get medical care.

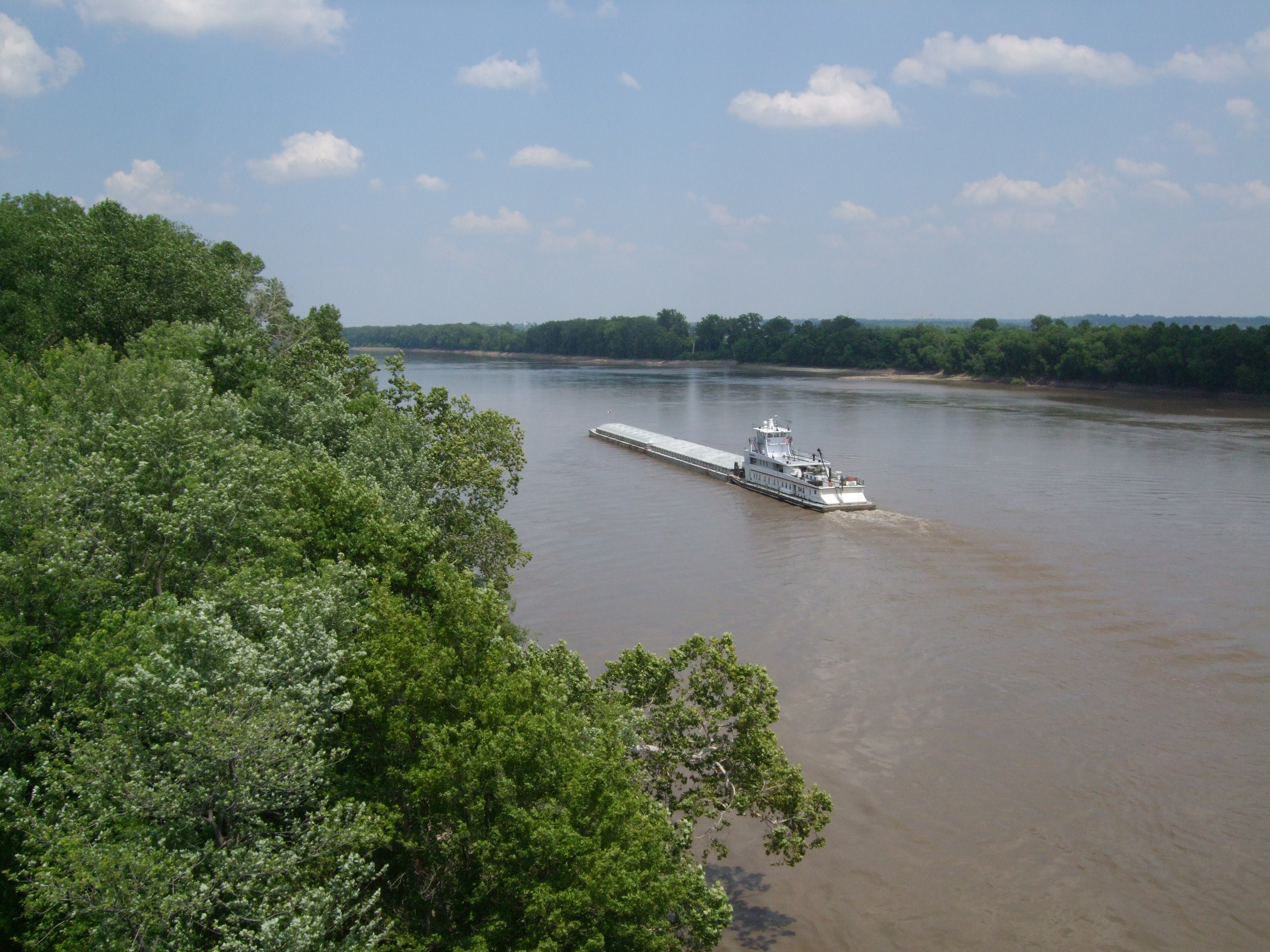
A barge travels North on the Missouri River at Highway 364 in Saint Charles, Missouri

The industry's success, however, did not guarantee safety. In the early decades before man controlled the river's flow, its sketchy rises and falls and its massive amounts of sediment, which prevented a clear view of the bottom, wrecked some 300 vessels. Because of the dangers of navigating the Missouri River, the average ship's lifespan was only about four years. The development of the Transcontinental and Northern Pacific Railroads marked the beginning of the end of steamboat commerce on the Missouri. Outcompeted by trains, the number of boats slowly dwindled, until there was almost nothing left by the 1890s. Transport of agricultural and mining products by barge, however, saw a revival in the early twentieth century.

=== Passage to Sioux City ===
Since the beginning of the 20th century, the Missouri River has been extensively engineered for water transport purposes, and about 32 percent of the river now flows through artificially straightened channels. In 1912, the USACE was authorized to maintain the Missouri to a depth of six feet (1.8 meters) from the Port of Kansas City to the mouth, a distance of 368 miles (592 km). This was accomplished by constructing levees and wing dams to direct the river's flow into a straight, narrow channel and prevent sedimentation. In 1925, the USACE began a project to widen the river's navigation channel to 200 feet (61 m); two years later, they began dredging a deep-water channel from Kansas City to Sioux City. These modifications have reduced the river's length from some 2,540 miles (4,090 km) in the late 19th century to 2,341 miles (3,767 km) in the present day.

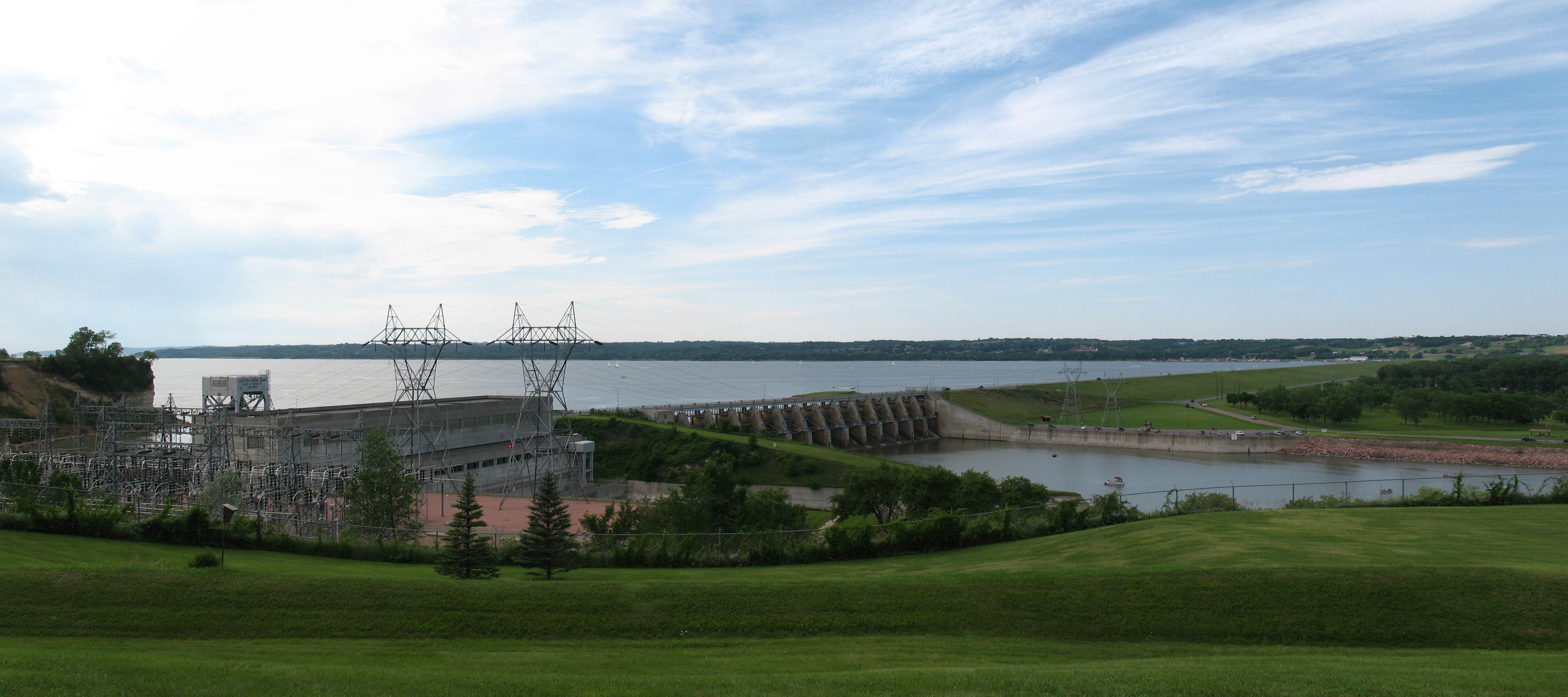
Gavins Point Dam at Yankton, South Dakota, is the uppermost obstacle to navigation from the mouth on the Missouri today.

Construction of dams on the Missouri under the Pick-Sloan Plan in the mid-twentieth century was the final step in aiding navigation. The large reservoirs of the Mainstem System help provide a dependable flow to maintain the navigation channel year-round, and are capable of halting most of the river's annual freshets. However, high and low water cycles of the Missouri – notably the protracted early-21st-century drought in the Missouri River basin and historic floods in 1993 and 2011 – are difficult for even the massive Mainstem System reservoirs to control.

In 1945, the USACE began the Missouri River Bank Stabilization and Navigation Project, which would permanently increase the river's navigation channel to a width of 300 feet (91 m) and a depth of nine feet (2.7 meters). During work that continues to this day, the 735-mile (1,183 km) navigation channel from Sioux City to St. Louis has been controlled by building rock dikes to direct the river's flow and scour out sediments, sealing and cutting off meanders and side channels, and dredging the riverbed. However, the Missouri has often resisted the efforts of the USACE to control its depth. In 2006, the U.S. Coast Guard stated that commercial barge tows ran aground in the Missouri River because the navigation channel had been severely silted. The USACE was blamed for failing to maintain the channel to the minimum depth.

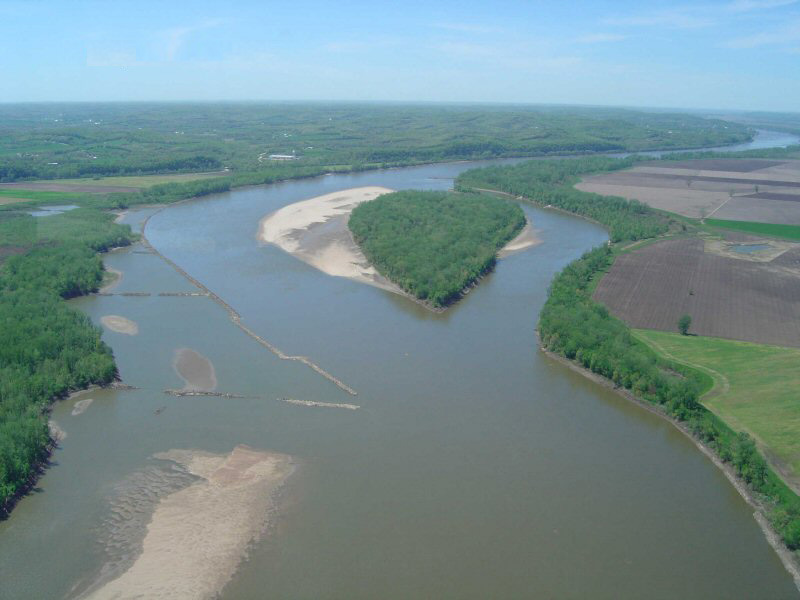
The Missouri River near New Haven, Missouri, looking upstream – note the riprap wing dam protruding into the river from the left to direct its flow into a narrower channel

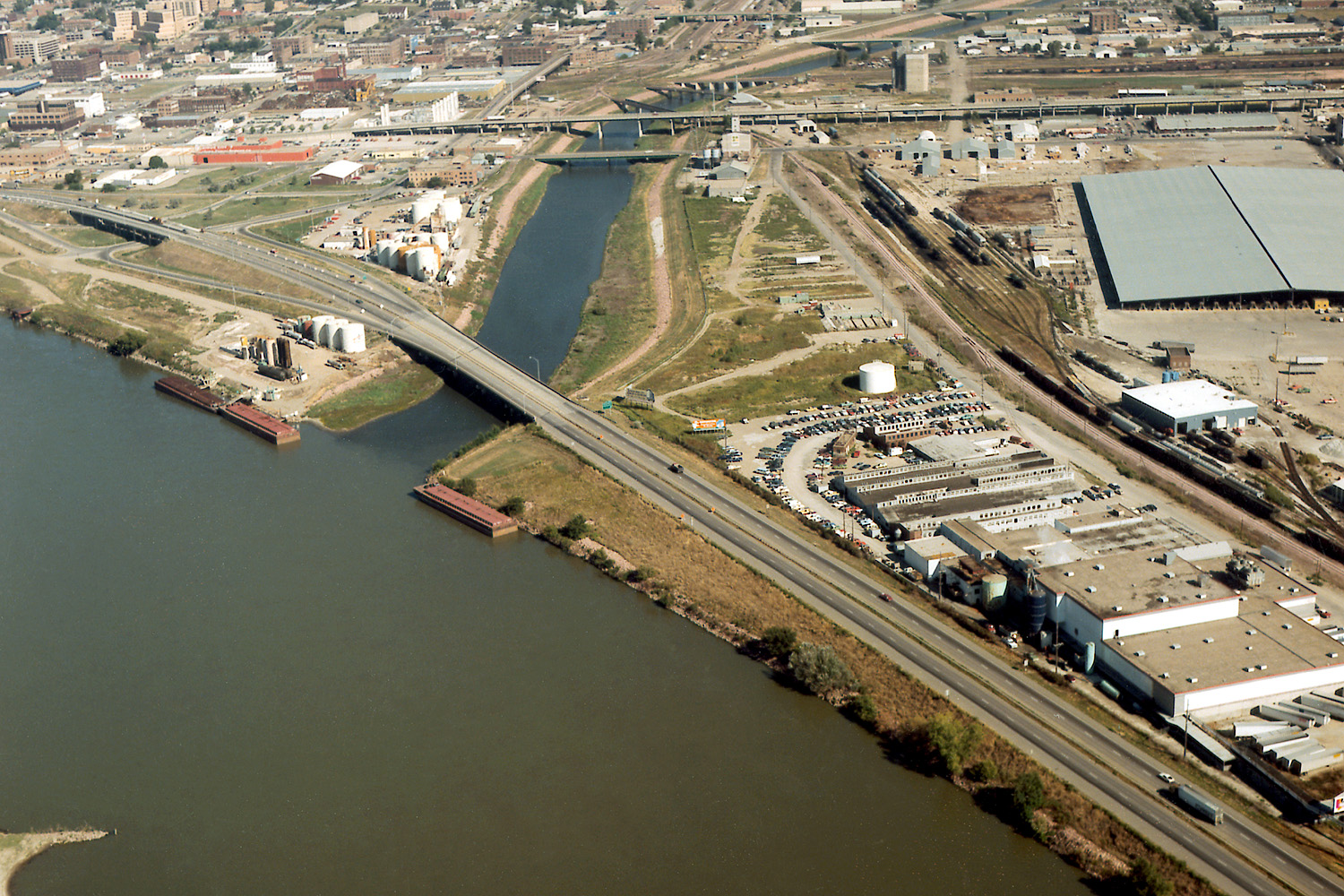
The Missouri River at the confluence with the Floyd River in Sioux City, Iowa, near the upper most navigable reach of the river today

In 1929, the Missouri River Navigation Commission estimated the amount of goods shipped on the river annually at 15 million tons (13.6 million metric tons), providing widespread consensus for the creation of a navigation channel. However, shipping traffic has since been far lower than expected – shipments of commodities including produce, manufactured items, lumber, and oil averaged only 683,000 tons (616,000 t) per year from 1994 to 2006.

By tonnage of transported material, Missouri is by far the largest user of the river accounting for 83 percent of river traffic, while Kansas has 12 percent, Nebraska three percent and Iowa two percent. Almost all of the barge traffic on the Missouri River ships sand and gravel dredged from the lower 500 miles (800 km) of the river; the remaining portion of the shipping channel now sees little to no use by commercial vessels.

For navigation purposes, the Missouri River is divided into two main sections. The Upper Missouri River is north of Gavins Point Dam, the last hydroelectric dam of fifteen on the river, just upstream from Sioux City, Iowa. The Lower Missouri River is the 840 miles (1,350 km) of river below Gavins Point until it meets the Mississippi just above St. Louis. The Lower Missouri River has no hydroelectric dams or locks but it has a plethora of wing dams that enable barge traffic by directing the flow of the river into a 200-foot-wide (61 m), 12-foot-deep (3.7 m) channel. These wing dams have been put in place by and are maintained by the U.S. Army Corps of Engineers, and there are no plans to construct any locks to replace these wing dams on the Missouri River.

=== Traffic decline ===
Tonnage of goods shipped by barges on the Missouri River has seen a serious decline from the 1960s to the present. In the 1960s, the USACE predicted an increase to 12 million short tons (11 Mt) per year by 2000, but instead the opposite has happened. The amount of goods plunged from 3.3 million short tons (3.0 Mt) in 1977 to just 1.3 million short tons (1.2 Mt) in 2000. One of the largest drops has been in agricultural products, especially wheat. Part of the reason is that irrigated land along the Missouri has only been developed to a fraction of its potential. In 2006, barges on the Missouri hauled only 200,000 short tons (180,000 t) of products which is equal to the daily freight traffic on the Mississippi.

Drought conditions in the early 21st century and competition from other modes of transport – mainly railroads – are the primary reason for decreasing river traffic on the Missouri. The USACE's failure to consistently maintain the navigation channel has also hampered the industry. Efforts are being made to revive the shipping industry on the Missouri River, because of the efficiency and cheapness of river transport to haul agricultural products, and the overcrowding of alternative transportation routes. Solutions such as expanding the navigation channel and releasing more water from reservoirs during the peak of the navigation season are under consideration. Drought conditions lifted in 2010, in which about 334,000 short tons (303,000 t) were barged on the Missouri, representing the first significant increase in shipments since 2000. However, flooding in 2011 closed record stretches of the river to boat traffic – "wash[ing] away hopes for a bounce-back year".

There are no lock and dams on the lower Missouri River, but there are plenty of wing dams that jettie out into the river and make it harder for barges to navigate. In contrast, the upper Mississippi has 29 locks and dams and averaged 61.3 million tons of cargo annually from 2008 to 2011, and its locks are closed in the winter.

== Ecology ==
=== Natural history ===
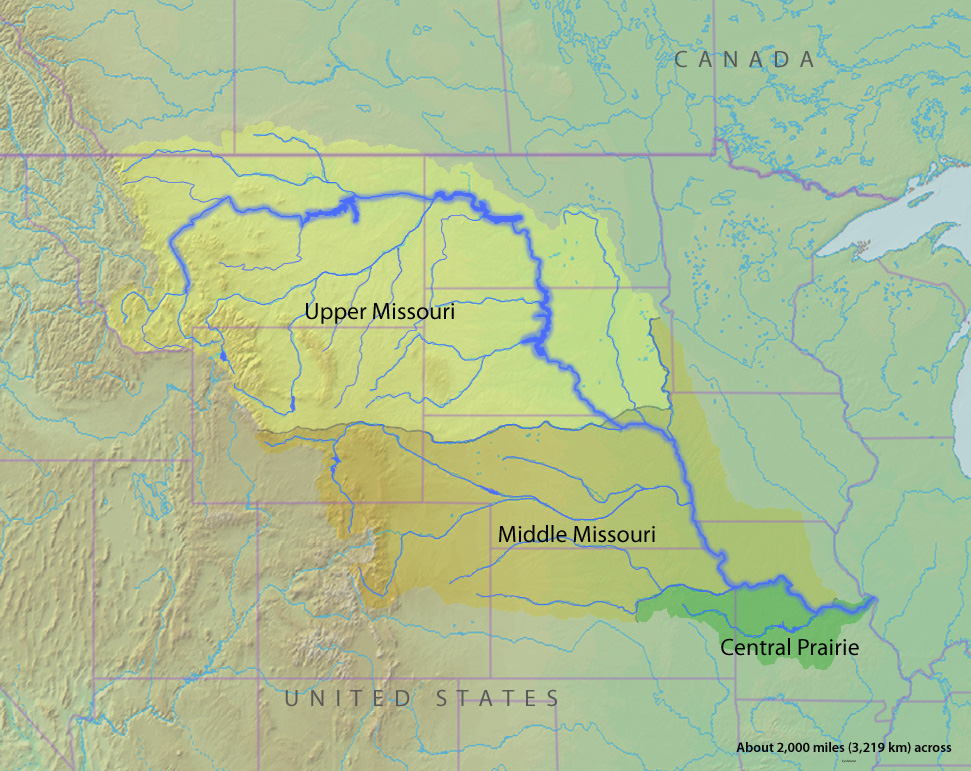
Freshwater ecoregions of the Missouri basin

Historically, the thousands of square miles that comprised the floodplain of the Missouri River supported a wide range of plant and animal species. Biodiversity generally increased proceeding downstream from the cold, subalpine headwaters in Montana to the temperate, moist climate of Missouri. Today, the river's riparian zone consists primarily of cottonwoods, willows and sycamores, with several other types of trees such as maple and ash. Average tree height generally increases farther from the riverbanks for a limited distance, as land next to the river is vulnerable to soil erosion during floods. Because of its large sediment concentrations, the Missouri does not support many aquatic invertebrates. However, the basin supports about 300 species of birds and 150 species of fish, some of which are endangered such as the pallid sturgeon. The Missouri's aquatic and riparian habitats also support several species of mammals, such as minks, river otters, beavers, muskrats, and raccoons.

The World Wide Fund For Nature divides the Missouri River watershed into three freshwater ecoregions: the Upper Missouri, Lower Missouri and Central Prairie. The Upper Missouri, roughly encompassing the area within Montana, Wyoming, southern Alberta and Saskatchewan, and North Dakota, comprises mainly semiarid shrub-steppe grasslands with sparse biodiversity because of Ice Age glaciations. There are no known endemic species within the region. Except for the headwaters in the Rockies, there is little precipitation in this part of the watershed. The Middle Missouri ecoregion, extending through Colorado, southwestern Minnesota, northern Kansas, Nebraska, and parts of Wyoming and Iowa, has greater rainfall and is characterized by temperate forests and grasslands. Plant life is more diverse in the Middle Missouri, which is also home to about twice as many animal species. Finally, the Central Prairie ecoregion is situated on the lower part of the Missouri, encompassing all or parts of Missouri, Kansas, Oklahoma and Arkansas. Despite large seasonal temperature fluctuations, this region has the greatest diversity of plants and animals of the three. Thirteen species of crayfish are endemic to the lower Missouri.

=== Human impacts ===
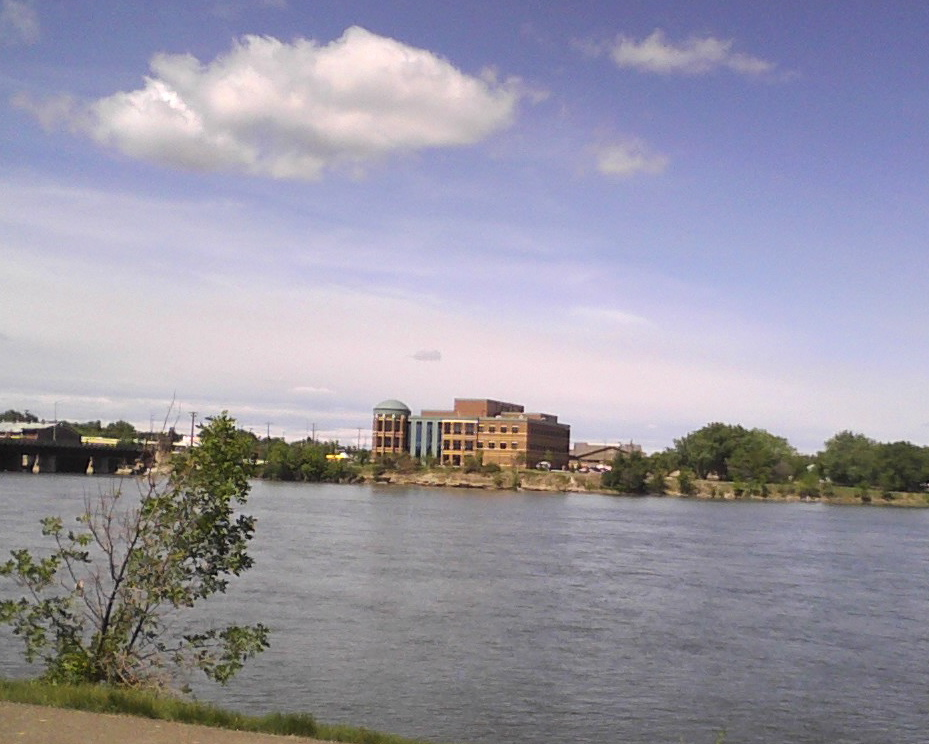
Missouri River as it flows through Great Falls, Montana

Since river commerce and industrial development began in the 1800s, human activity has severely polluted the Missouri and degraded its water quality. Most of the river's floodplain habitat is long gone, replaced by irrigated agricultural land. Development of the floodplain has led to increasing numbers of people and infrastructure within areas at high risk of inundation. Levees have been constructed along more than a third of the river to keep floodwater within the channel, but with the consequences of faster stream velocity and a resulting increase of peak flows in downstream areas. Fertilizer runoff, which causes elevated levels of nitrogen and other nutrients, is a major problem along the Missouri River, especially in Iowa and Missouri. This form of pollution also affects the upper Mississippi, Illinois and Ohio Rivers. Low oxygen levels in rivers and the vast Gulf of Mexico dead zone at the end of the Mississippi Delta are both results of high nutrient concentrations in the Missouri and other tributaries of the Mississippi.

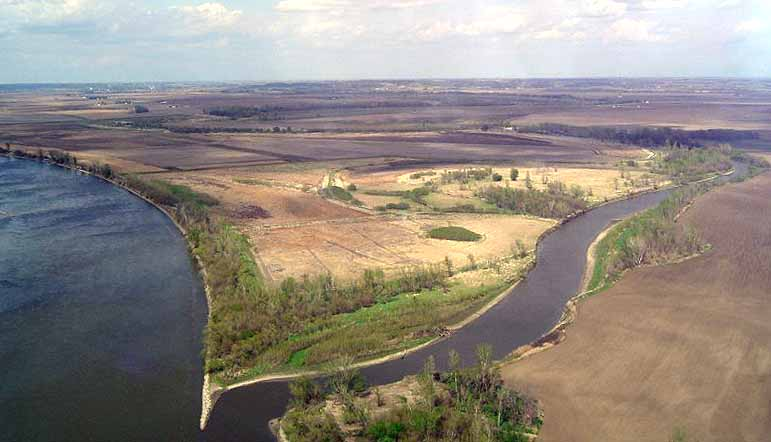
Agricultural fields dominate most of the former floodplain, including this area around the Missouri's confluence with the Nishnabotna River in western Missouri.

Channelization of the lower Missouri waters has made the river narrower, deeper and less accessible to riparian flora and fauna. Many dams and bank stabilization projects have been built to help convert 300,000 acres (1,200 km^{2}) of Missouri River floodplain to agricultural land. Channel control has reduced the volume of sediment transported downstream by the river and eliminated critical habitat for fish, birds and amphibians. By the early 21st century, declines in populations of native species prompted the U.S. Fish and Wildlife Service to issue a biological opinion recommending restoration of river habitats for federally endangered bird and fish species.

The USACE began work on ecosystem restoration projects along the lower Missouri River in the early 21st century. Because of the low use of the shipping channel in the lower Missouri maintained by the USACE, it is now considered feasible to remove some of the levees, dikes, and wing dams that constrict the river's flow, thus allowing it to naturally restore its banks. By 2001, there were 87,000 acres (350 km^{2}) of riverside floodplain undergoing active restoration.

Restoration projects have re-mobilized some of the sediments that had been trapped behind bank stabilization structures, prompting concerns of exacerbated nutrient and sediment pollution locally and downstream in the northern Gulf of Mexico. A 2010 National Research Council report assessed the roles of sediment in the Missouri River, evaluating current habitat restoration strategies and alternative ways to manage sediment. The report found that a better understanding of sediment processes in the Missouri River, including the creation of a "sediment budget" – an accounting of sediment transport, erosion, and deposition volumes for the length of the Missouri River – would provide a foundation for projects to improve water quality standards and protect endangered species.

=== National Wild and Scenic River ===
Several sections of the Missouri River were added to the National Wild and Scenic Rivers System from Fort Benton to Robinson Bridge, Gavins Point Dam to Ponca State Park and Fort Randall Dam to Lewis and Clark Lake. A total of 247 miles (398 km) of the river were designated including 64 miles (103 km) of wild river and 26 miles (42 km) of scenic river in Montana. 157 miles (253 km) of the river is listed as recreational under the National Wild and Scenic Rivers System.

== Tourism and recreation ==
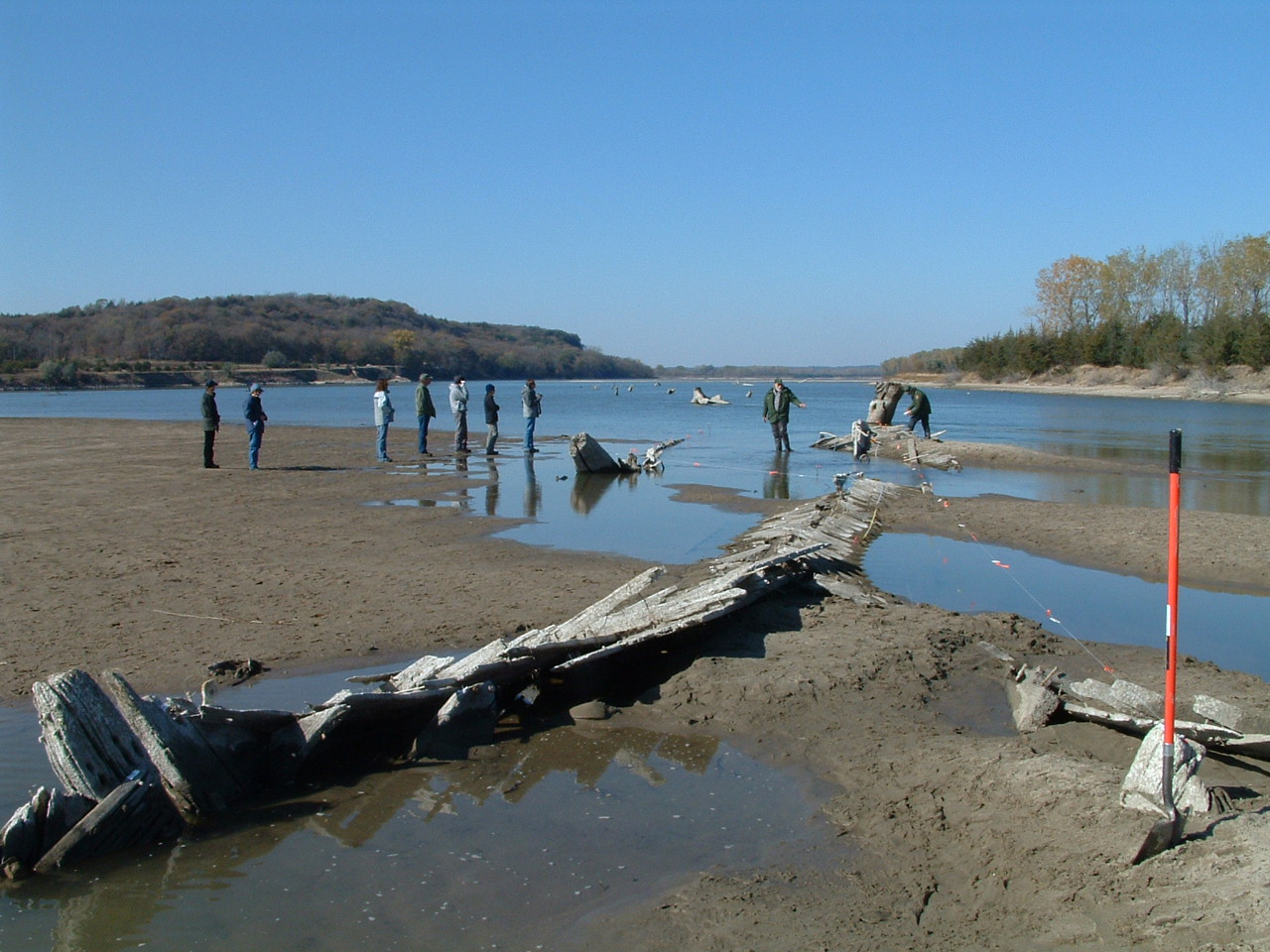
Part of the Missouri National Recreational River, a 98-mile (158 km) preserved stretch of the Missouri on the border of South Dakota and Nebraska

With over 1,500 mi^{2} (3,900 km^{2}) of open water, the six reservoirs of the Missouri River Mainstem System provide some of the main recreational areas within the basin. Visitation has increased from 10 million visitor-hours in the mid-1960s to over 60 million visitor-hours in 1990. Development of visitor facilities was spurred by the Federal Water Project Recreation Act of 1965, which required the USACE to build and maintain boat ramps, campgrounds and other public facilities along major reservoirs. Recreational use of Missouri River reservoirs is estimated to contribute $85–100 million to the regional economy each year.

The Lewis and Clark National Historic Trail, some 3,700 miles (6,000 km) long, follows nearly the entire Missouri River from its mouth to its source, retracing the route of the Lewis and Clark Expedition. Extending from Wood River, Illinois, in the east, to Astoria, Oregon, in the west, it also follows portions of the Mississippi and Columbia Rivers. The trail, which spans through eleven U.S. states, is maintained by various federal and state government agencies; it passes through some 100 historic sites, notably archaeological locations including the Knife River Indian Villages National Historic Site.

Parts of the river itself are designated for recreational or preservational use. The Missouri National Recreational River consists of portions of the Missouri downstream from Fort Randall and Gavins Point Dams that total 98 miles (158 km). These reaches exhibit islands, meanders, sandbars, underwater rocks, riffles, snags, and other once-common features of the lower river that have now disappeared under reservoirs or have been destroyed by channeling. About forty-five steamboat wrecks are scattered along these reaches of the river.

Downstream from Great Falls, Montana, about 149 miles (240 km) of the river course through a rugged series of canyons and badlands known as the Missouri Breaks. This part of the river, designated a U.S. National Wild and Scenic River in 1976, flows within the Upper Missouri Breaks National Monument, a 375,000-acre (1,520 km^{2}) preserve comprising steep cliffs, deep gorges, arid plains, badlands, archaeological sites, and whitewater rapids on the Missouri itself. The preserve includes a wide variety of plant and animal life; recreational activities include boating, rafting, hiking and wildlife observation.

In north-central Montana, some 1,100,000 acres (4,500 km^{2}) along over 125 miles (201 km) of the Missouri River, centering on Fort Peck Lake, comprise the Charles M. Russell National Wildlife Refuge. The wildlife refuge consists of a native northern Great Plains ecosystem that has not been heavily affected by human development, except for the construction of Fort Peck Dam. Although there are few designated trails, the whole preserve is open to hiking and camping.

Many U.S. national parks, such as Glacier National Park, Rocky Mountain National Park, Yellowstone National Park and Badlands National Park are, at least partially, in the watershed. Parts of other rivers in the basin are set aside for preservation and recreational use – notably the Niobrara National Scenic River, which is a 76-mile (122 km) protected stretch of the Niobrara River, one of the Missouri's longest tributaries. The Missouri flows through or past many National Historic Landmarks, which include Three Forks of the Missouri, Fort Benton, Montana, Big Hidatsa Village Site, Fort Atkinson, Nebraska and Arrow Rock Historic District.

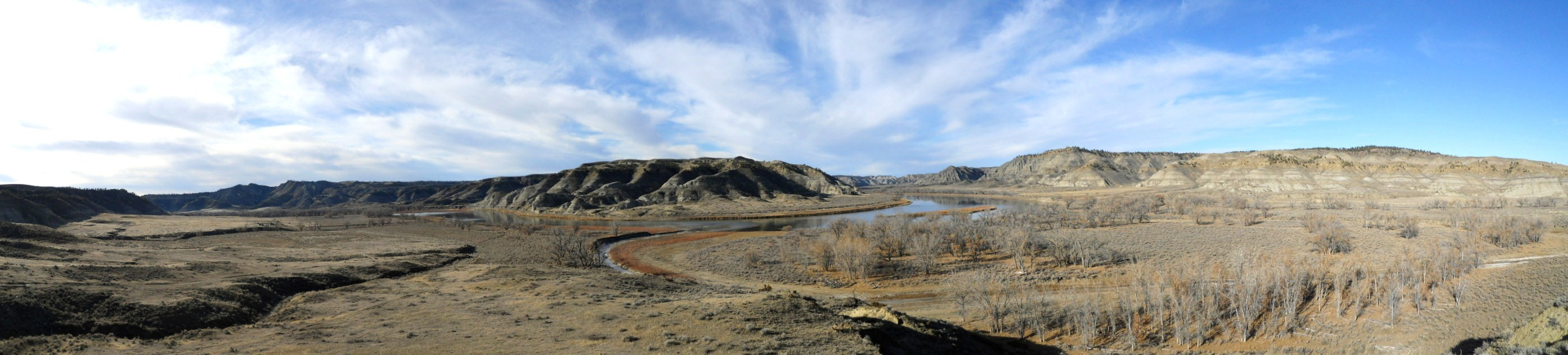
The Missouri River in Upper Missouri Breaks National Monument, Montana, at the confluence with Cow Creek

== See also ==
- Across the Wide Missouri (book)
- List of tributaries of the Mississippi River
- List of longest main-stem rivers in the United States
- List of crossings of the Missouri River
- List of populated places along the Missouri River
- Missouri National Recreational River
- U.S. Army Corps of Engineers
- Montana Stream Access Law
- Montana Wilderness Association
- Sacagawea
- Arabia Steamboat Museum
- Container on barge

== Works cited ==
- Athearn, Robert G. (1965). High country empire: the high plains and Rockies. University of Nebraska Press. ISBN 978-0-8032-5008-6.
- Baldridge, W. Scott (2004). Geology of the American Southwest: a journey through two billion years of plate-tectonic history. Cambridge University Press. ISBN 978-0-521-01666-7.
- Benke, Arthur C.; Cushing, Colbert E. (2005). Rivers of North America. Academic Press. ISBN 978-0-12-088253-3.
- Cech, Thomas V. (2009). Principles of Water Resources: History, Development, Management, and Policy. John Wiley and Sons. ISBN 978-0-470-13631-7.
- Christensen, Lawrence O. (1999). Dictionary of Missouri biography. University of Missouri Press. ISBN 978-0-8262-1222-1.
- Demoth, I. MacDonald (1882). The History of Pettis County, Missouri.
- Dick, Everett (1971). Tales of the Frontier: From Lewis and Clark to the Last Roundup. University of Nebraska Press. ISBN 978-0-8032-5744-3.
- Edwards, Elwyn Hartley (1987). Horses: Their role in the history of man. Willow Books. ISBN 978-0-00-218216-4.
- Federal Writers' Project (1939). Montana: A State Guide Book. U.S. History Publishers. ISBN 978-1-60354-025-4.
- Feldhamer, George A.; Thompson, Bruce Carlyle; Chapman, Joseph A. (2003). Wild mammals of North America: Biology, management, and conservation. JHU Press. ISBN 978-0-8018-7416-1.
- Greene, Jerome A. (2003). Battles and Skirmishes of the Great Sioux War, 1876–1877: The Military View. University of Oklahoma Press. ISBN 978-0-8061-2669-2.
- Houck, Louis (1908). A history of Missouri from the earliest explorations and settlements until the admission of the state into the union. Vol. 1. R.R. Donnelley and Sons, Co. ISBN 978-0-405-02856-4.
- Kellogg, Louis Phelps (1917). Early narratives of the Northwest, 1634–1699. Vol. 18. C. Scribners's Sons.
- King, Philip B. (1971). The Evolution of North America (Revised ed.). Princeton University Press.
- Lott, Dale F.; Greene, Harry W. (2003). American Bison: A Natural History. University of California Press. ISBN 978-0-520-24062-9.
- Mattes, Merrill J. (1987). The Great Platte River Road: The Covered Wagon Mainline Via Fort Kearny to Fort Laramie. University of Nebraska Press. ISBN 978-0-8032-8153-0.
- McFarlan, Donald; McWhirter, Norris (1992). Guinness Book of World Records. Bantam Books. ISBN 978-0-553-29537-5.
- Morris, Charles, ed. (1912). Twentieth Century Encyclopædia: A Library of Universal Knowledge. Vol. 5. Syndicate Publishing Co.
- Mulvaney, Tom (2008). Helena. Arcadia Publishing. ISBN 978-0-7385-5977-3.
- Roberts, David C.; Hodsdon, W. Grant (2001). A Field Guide to Geology: Eastern North America. Houghton Mifflin Harcourt. ISBN 978-0-618-16438-7.
- Rogers, Jerry R.; Brown, Glenn Owen; Garbrecht, Jürgen (2004). Water Resources and Environmental History. ASCE Publications. ISBN 978-0-7844-0738-7.
- Singer, Siegfried Fred (1970). Global effects of environmental pollution: a symposium organized by the American Association for the Advancement of Science. Springer. ISBN 978-90-277-0151-0.
- South Dakota State Historical Society; South Dakota Department of History (1902). South Dakota historical collections. Vol. 1. State Publishing Co.
- Sunder, John E. (1993). The Fur Trade on the Upper Missouri, 1840–1865. University of Oklahoma Press. ISBN 978-0-8061-2566-4.
- Thornbury, W. (1965). Regional geomorphology of the United States. John Wiley and Sons. ISBN 978-0-471-86200-0.
