= Wing dam =

Manmade barrier that extends partway into a river

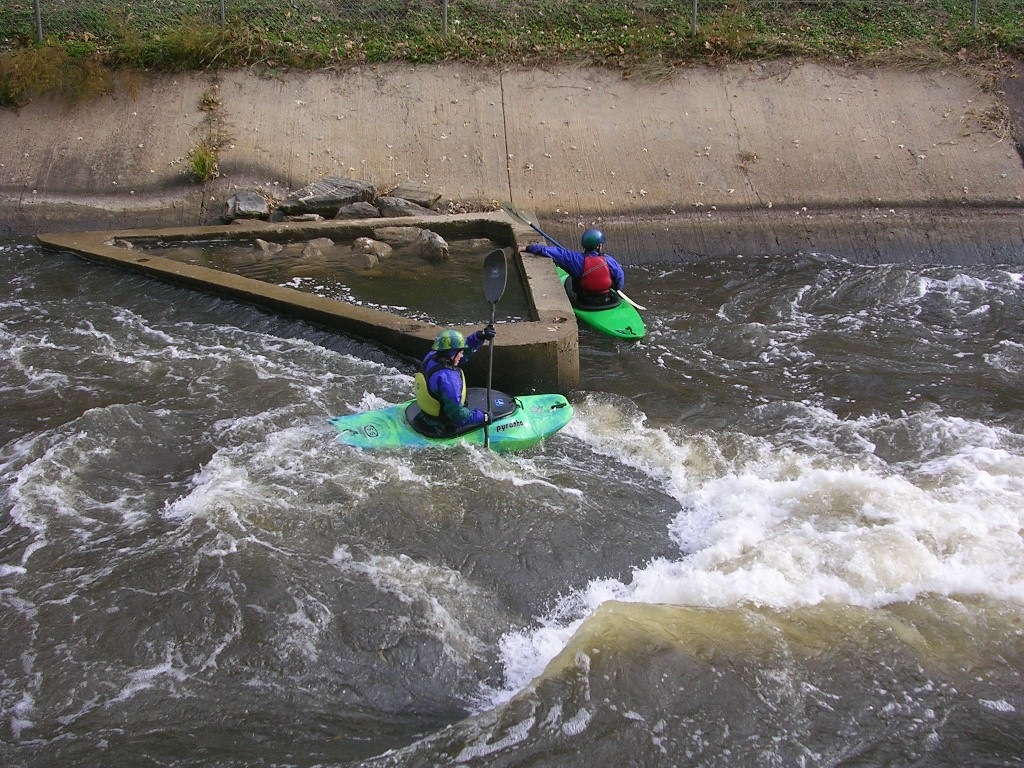
Wing dam in a man-made river bed

A wing dam or wing dike is a man-made barrier that, unlike a conventional dam, only extends partway into a river. These structures force water into a fast-moving center channel which reduces the rate of sediment accumulation, while slowing water flow near the riverbanks.

The Mississippi River in North America has thousands of wing dams which were originally constructed to reduce the amount of dredging required when the main navigation channel was maintained to at least 4 1/2 feet (1.4 m). Since that time, additional conventional dams have been built to increase the water level in the river, doubling the depth of the navigation channel to 9 feet (2.7 m). The wing dams still serve their purpose, but to a lesser extent than before.

While wing dams assist in assuring that rivers are navigable, they can also pose a threat to boaters. Many wing dams are often underwater and may be difficult to see, and can easily be struck by vessels. On the other hand, fishermen intentionally fish the quieter waters downstream of wing dams.

The action of wing dams is complex. Where they are installed, sediment is removed from the center of the river, but sediment is also carried further down the river where it has secondary effects. Some researchers believe that flooding is increased by wing dams; a 2013 theoretical analysis predicts that wing dams may lead to water level lowering for in-bank flows and to water level increases for out-of-bank (flood) flows.

== See also ==
- Groyne
- Weir
