= List of dams and reservoirs in Montana =

Following is a list of dams and reservoirs in Montana.

All major dams are linked below. The National Inventory of Dams defines any "major dam" as being 50 feet (15 m) tall with a storage capacity of at least 5,000 acre-feet (6,200,000 m^{3}), or of any height with a storage capacity of 25,000 acre-feet (31,000,000 m^{3}).

== Dams and reservoirs in Montana ==
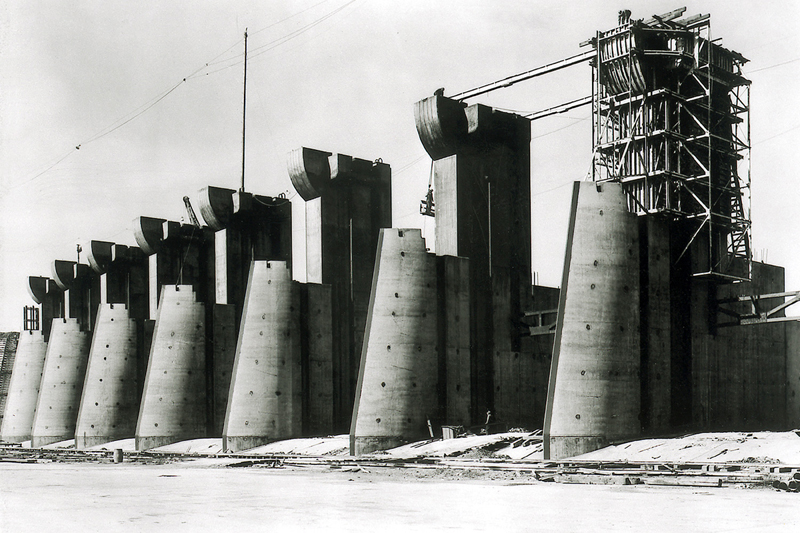
Fort Peck Dam spillway under construction

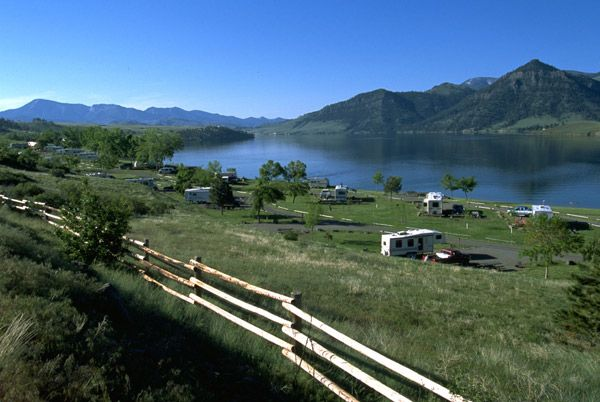
Holter Lake

This list is incomplete. You can help Wikipedia by expanding it.

- Black Eagle Dam, unnamed reservoir, NorthWestern Energy
- Box Elder Creek Dam, Boxelder Lake, City of Plentywood
- Bynum Reservoir Dam, Bynum Reservoir, Teton Cooperative Reservoir Company
- Canyon Ferry Dam, Canyon Ferry Lake, United States Bureau of Reclamation
- Clark Canyon Dam, Clark Canyon Reservoir, USBR
- Cochrane Dam, unnamed reservoir, NorthWestern Energy
- Como Dam, Como Lake, USBR
- Cooney Dam, Cooney Reservoir, State of Montana
- Fort Peck Dam, Fort Peck Lake, United States Army Corps of Engineers
- Fresno Dam, Fresno Reservoir, USBR
- Gibson Dam, Gibson Reservoir, USBR
- Hauser Dam, Hauser Lake, NorthWestern Energy
- Hebgen Dam, Hebgen Lake, NorthWestern Energy
- Holter Dam, Holter Lake, NorthWestern Energy
- Hungry Horse Dam, Hungry Horse Reservoir, USBR
- Kicking Horse Dam, Kicking Horse Reservoir, Bureau of Indian Affairs
- Libby Dam, Lake Koocanusa, USACE
- Lower Two Medicine Dam, Lower Two Medicine Lake, Lake Elwell, Bureau of Indian Affairs
- Madison Dam, Ennis Lake, NorthWestern Energy
- Milltown Dam (removed)
- Morony Dam, unnamed reservoir, NorthWestern Energy
- Mystic Lake Dam, Mystic Lake, NorthWestern Energy
- Noxon Rapids Dam, Noxon Reservoir, Avista
- Rainbow Dam, unnamed reservoir, NorthWestern Energy
- Ryan Dam, unnamed reservoir, NorthWestern Energy
- Lake Sherburne Dam, Lake Sherburne, USBR
- SKQ Dam, Flathead Lake, Energy Keepers Inc.
- Swift Dam, Swift Reservoir, Pondera County Canal and Reservoir Company
- Thompson Falls Dam, unnamed reservoir, NorthWestern Energy
- Tiber Dam, Lake Elwell, USBR
- Tongue River Dam, Tongue River Reservoir, Montana Department of Natural Resources and Conservation
- Toston Dam, Toston Reservoir, Montana Department of Natural Resources
- Willow Creek Dam, Willow Creek Reservoir, USBR
- Yellowtail Dam, Bighorn Lake, USBR
