= Boat Mountain =

Mountain in Montana, United States

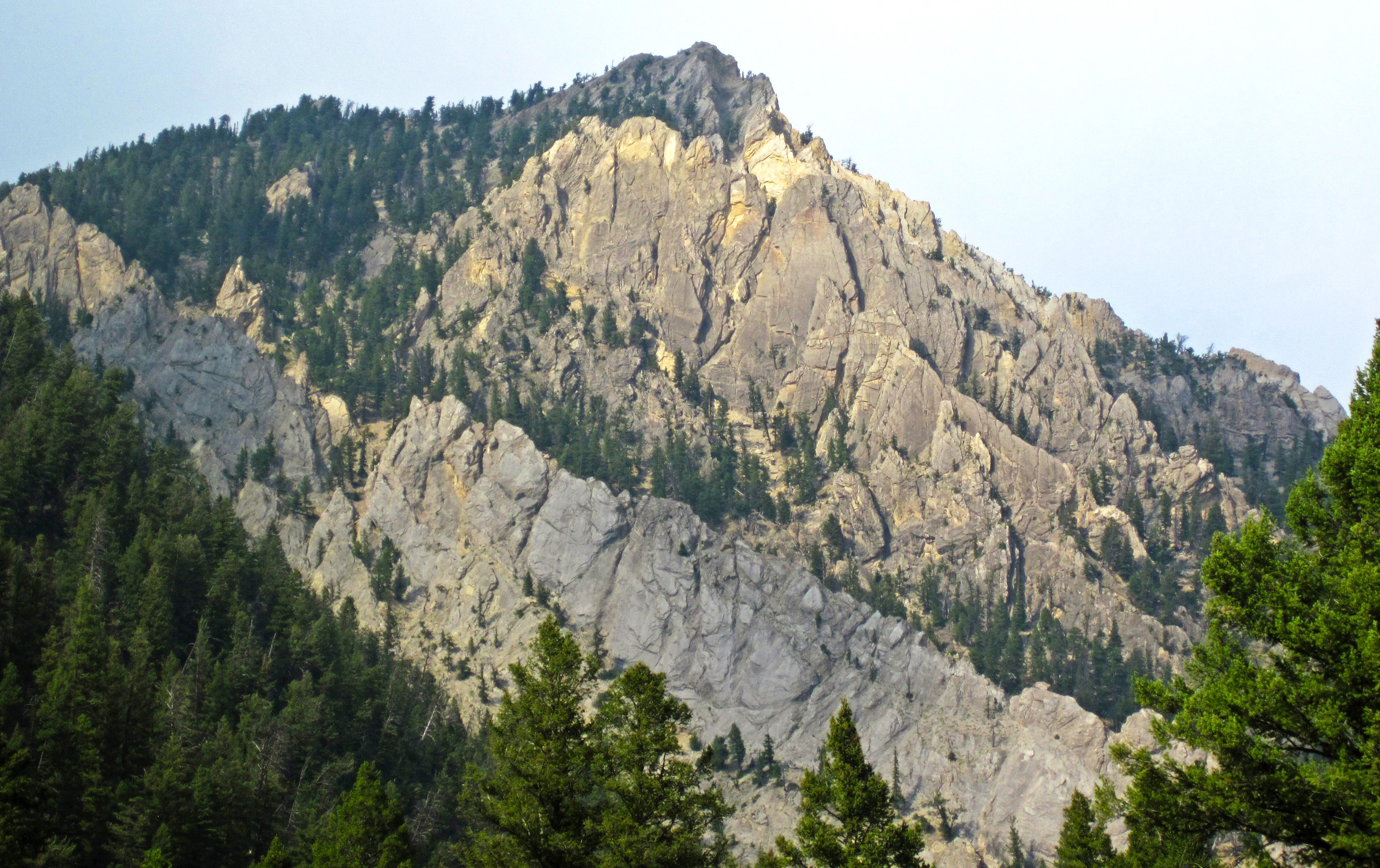
- Southern end of Boat Mountain

Highest point
- Elevation: 9,071 ft (2,765 m)
- Prominence: 1,351 ft (412 m)
- Parent peak: Pika Point
- Isolation: 3.16 mi (5.09 km)
- Coordinates: 44°53′53″N 111°20′32″W

Geography
- Location within Montana Location within the United States
- Country: United States
- State: Montana
- County: Gallatin
- Protected area: Gallatin National Forest
- Parent range: Madison Range
- Topo map: USGS Pika Point

Geology
- Rock type: Sedimentary rock

Boat Mountain is a 9,071-foot (2,765-metre) mountain summit in Gallatin County, Montana, United States.

== Description ==
Boat Mountain is located 20 miles (32 km) northwest of West Yellowstone, Montana, in the Madison Range, which is a subrange of the Rocky Mountains. It is situated on land managed by Gallatin National Forest and can be seen from Highway 287. Precipitation runoff from the mountain's east slope drains into Cabin Creek and the west slope drains into Beaver Creek, which are both tributaries of the nearby Madison River. Topographic relief is significant as the summit rises 2,400 feet (732 meters) above Beaver Creek in 0.85 miles (1.37 km). Boat Mountain is set two miles north of Hebgen Lake, site of the 1959 Hebgen Lake earthquake which was the largest and deadliest in Montana's recorded history. The earthquake caused a huge 80-million-ton landslide that blocked the Madison River which created Earthquake Lake three miles southwest of the mountain. The mountain's toponym has been officially adopted by the United States Board on Geographic Names.

== Climate ==
Based on the Köppen climate classification, Boat Mountain is located in a subarctic climate zone characterized by long, usually very cold winters, and mild summers. Winter temperatures can drop below 0 °F with wind chill factors below −10 °F.

== See also ==
- Geology of the Rocky Mountains

== Gallery ==
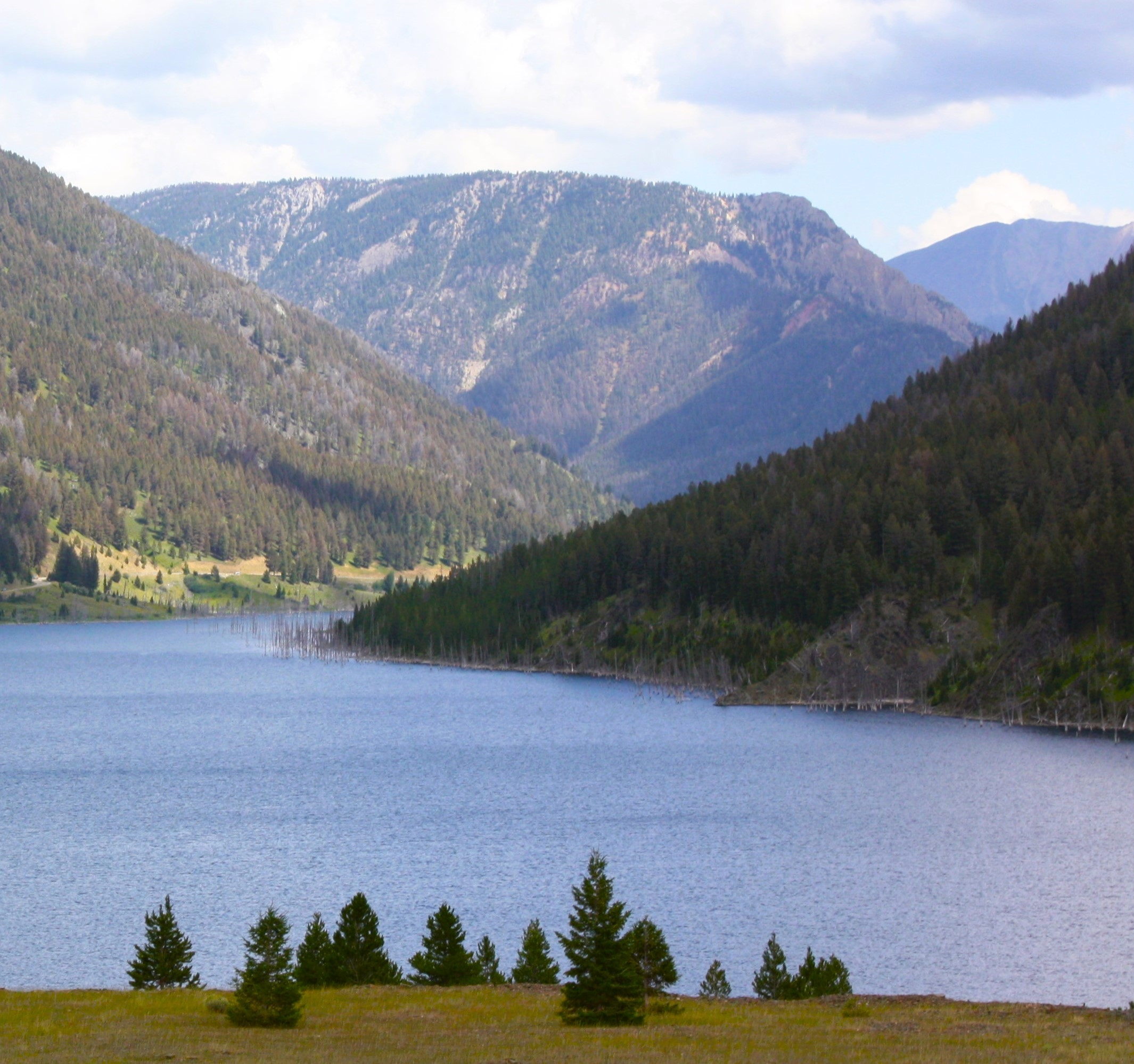
Southwest aspect of Boat Mountain beyond Earthquake Lake

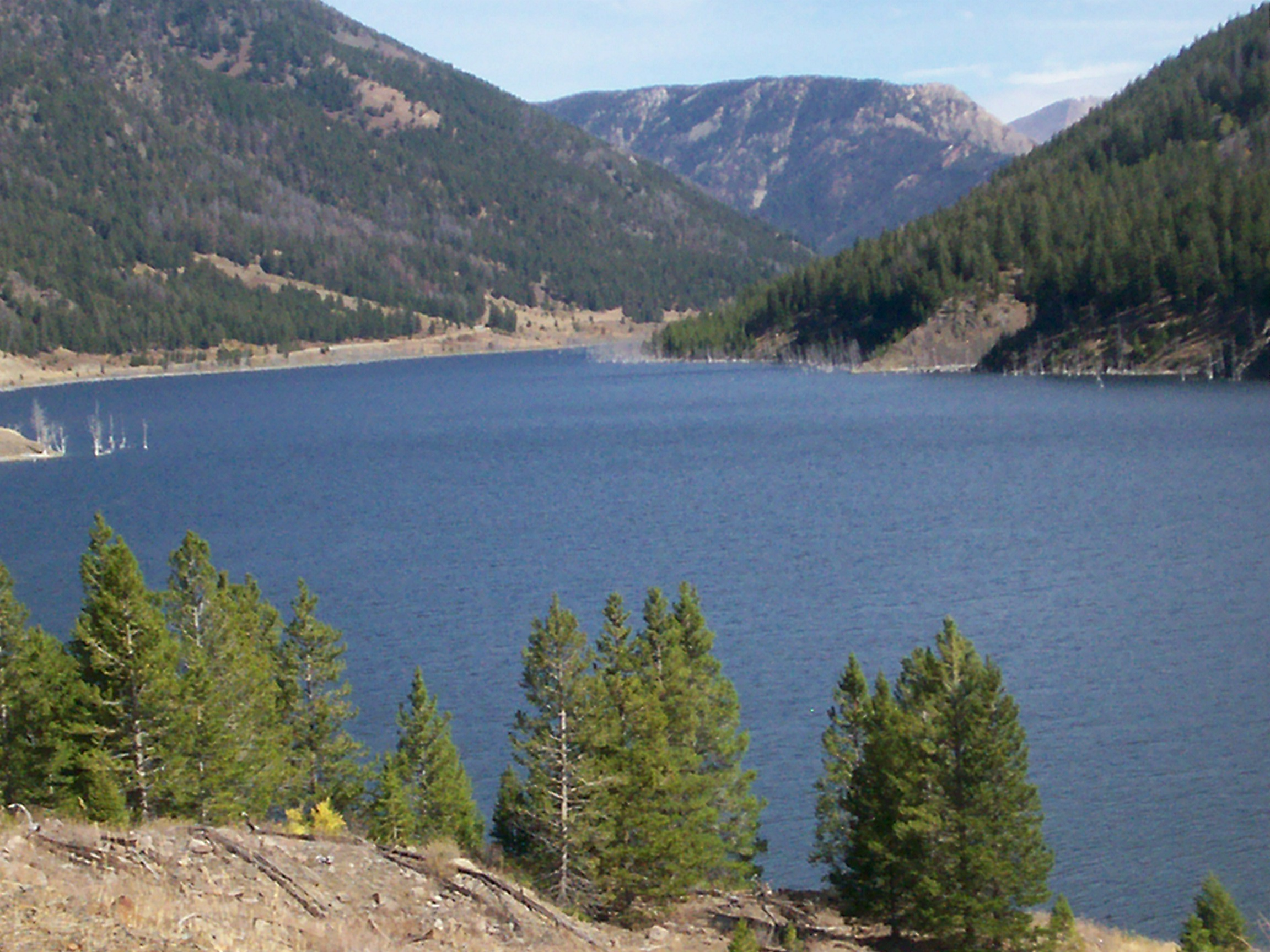
Earthquake Lake with Boat Mountain in the distance
