= 1959 Hebgen Lake earthquake =

Earthquake in southwestern Montana, USA

- USGS isoseismal map

- Location within Montana Location within the United States
- UTC time: 1959-08-18 06:37:20
- ISC event: 882673
- USGS-ANSS: ComCat
- Local date: August 17, 1959; 67 years ago
- Local time: 23:37 (MST)
- Magnitude: 7.2 M_{w}
- Epicenter: 44.863°N 111.335°W; ~15 miles (24 km) north of West Yellowstone, Montana, U.S.
- Type: Dip-slip
- Areas affected: southwestern Montana, Idaho, Wyoming
- Max. intensity: MMI X (Extreme)
- Casualties: 28+ dead

The 1959 Hebgen Lake earthquake (also known as the 1959 Yellowstone earthquake) occurred in the western United States on August 17 at 11:37 pm (MST) in southwestern Montana.

The earthquake measured 7.2 on the moment magnitude scale, caused a huge landslide, resulted in over 28 fatalities and left $11 million (equivalent to $121 million in 2025) in damage. The slide blocked the flow of the Madison River, resulting in the creation of Quake Lake. Significant effects of the earthquake were also felt in nearby Idaho and Wyoming, and lesser effects as far away as Puerto Rico and Hawaii.

The 1959 quake was the strongest and deadliest earthquake to hit Montana, the second being the 1935–36 Helena earthquakes that left four people dead. It also caused the worst landslides in the northwestern United States since 1927.

== Earthquake ==
The earthquake occurred at 11:37 p.m. (MST) with a magnitude of 7.2 M_{w}. The U.S. Weather Bureau reported that the quake lasted 30–40 seconds. During the quake, the surrounding landscape dropped as much as 20 feet (6 m) and shockwaves caused numerous seiches to surge across Hebgen Lake for 12 hours. Water pushed by the seiches poured over Hebgen Dam which did not collapse. Several aftershocks ranging from 5.8 to 6.3 were reported after the quake.

The earthquake struck Madison Canyon, an area to the west of Yellowstone National Park. Several nearby campgrounds were occupied by vacationing campers and tourists at the time.

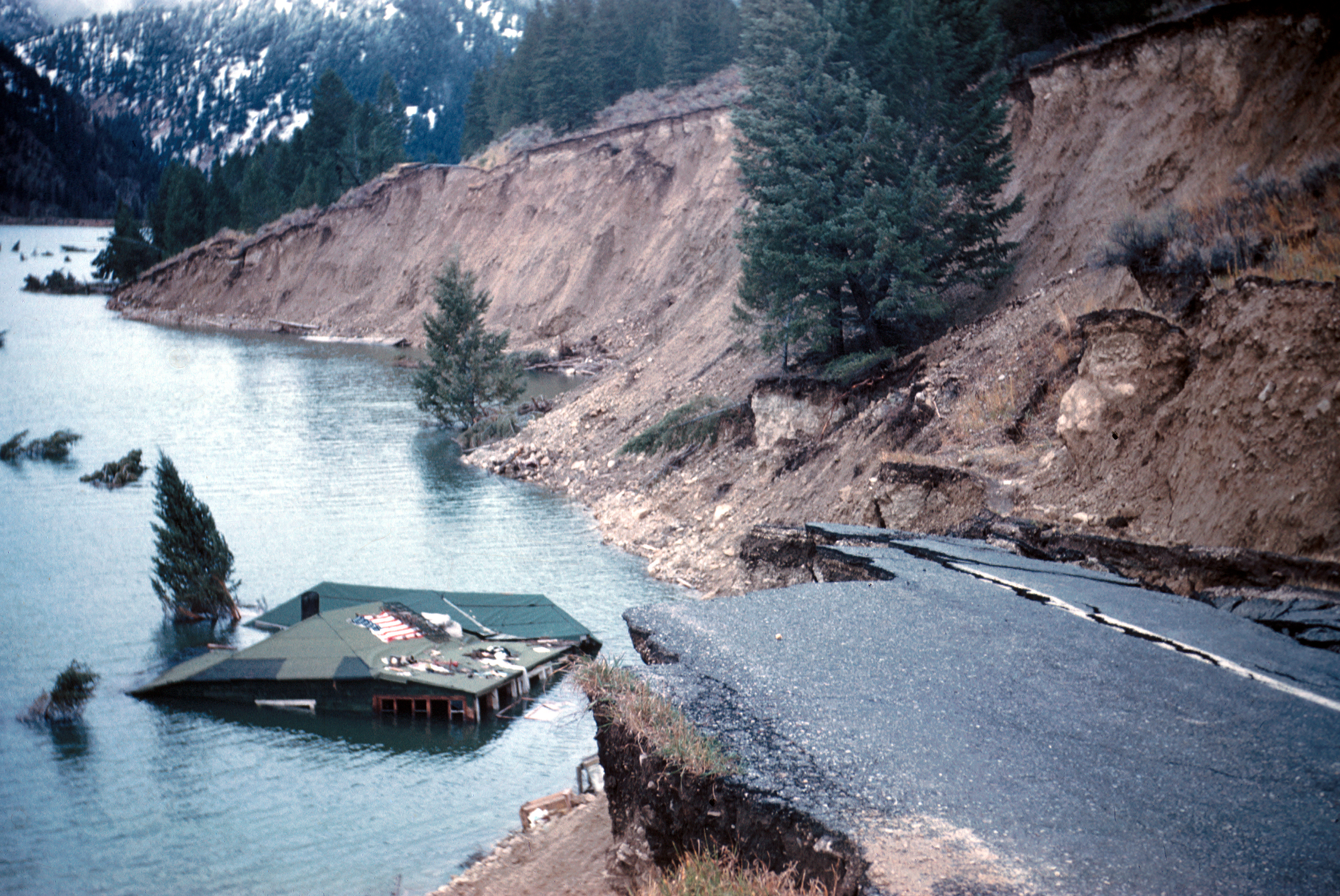
Highway 287 slumped into Hebgen Lake, 1959 image

Although magnitude estimates for the 1959 earthquake vary (the United States Geological Survey recorded the quake at both 7.3 and 7.5, now calculated by the ISC as 7.2 M_{w}) the 1959 earthquake is comparable to the 1906 San Francisco earthquake as one of the strongest earthquakes in North America, behind the 1964 magnitude 9.2 Good Friday earthquake in Alaska and the 1811–1812 New Madrid earthquakes in Missouri. The 1959 earthquake is also the most severe earthquake in the Rocky Mountains area of the United States along with the 6.9 magnitude earthquake which struck Idaho in 1983. The landslide caused by this quake was the largest since an earthquake in Wyoming in 1925 caused a landslide amounting to 50 million cubic yards (38 million cubic meters) of rock and debris that left 28 people dead. The death toll from the quake was also the highest since the 1925 earthquake and most recent for the Northwestern United States since an earthquake in 1927 that left seven people dead. The 1959 earthquake was also the most damaging earthquake to occur in Montana since the 1935–36 earthquakes that left four people dead. The Hebgen Lake area also experienced earthquakes again in 1964, 1974, 1977 and 1985.

=== Effects ===
The landslides caused by the quake carried 50 million cubic yards (38 million cubic meters) of rock, mud and debris down into the valley and created hurricane-force winds strong enough to toss cars. In Madison Canyon, the landslide swept away a family of six, four of whom perished. Two more fatalities were also reported in nearby Cliff Lake to the south. In Rock Creek, tourists camping there were caught off guard by the quake and landslide, which swept them into the creek. The earthquake caused a seiche which inundated trailers and tents, uprooted trees, and injured one additional person.

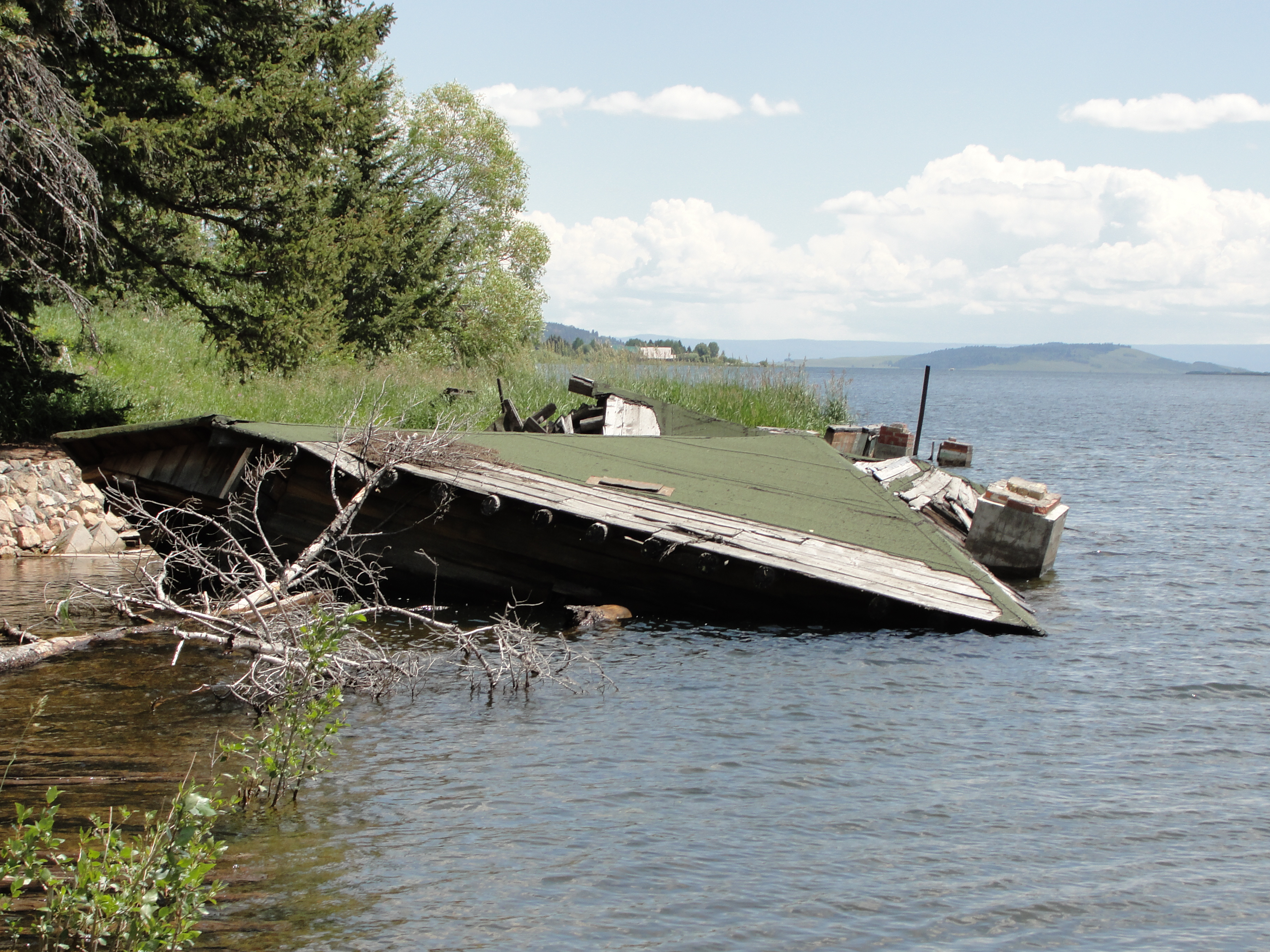
House destruction from the earthquake, July 2009

In nearby Yellowstone National Park, 289 springs erupted in geysers, 160 of which had never had geyser activity before, and cracks ruptured the surface. Near Old Faithful, the earthquake damaged the Old Faithful Inn, forcing guests there to evacuate. Landslides caused by the quake blocked a road between Mammoth and Old Faithful, damaging a bridge inside the park. There was one reported injury when a woman broke her wrist. The earthquake also created fault scarps as high as 20 feet (6.1 m), causing extensive damage to roads, homes, and buildings. In Belgrade, Montana the earthquake damaged measuring equipment placed in a 100-foot (30 m) water well. The quake also knocked out telephone communications between Bozeman and Yellowstone, with the city of Bozeman itself suffering moderate quake damage to homes and buildings. Buildings at the Montana State University campus also sustained quake damage. In Butte, the quake caused a pendulum clock to stop at 12:42 a.m. (MST) and caused minor damage to homes.

Areas around Hebgen Lake were also affected as the quake caused parts of the lake to rise eight feet (2.4 m). Roads and highways running along the shores of the lake collapsed into the water. In Ennis, most residents were evacuated due to concern Hebgen Lake might flood the town. The evacuation was subsequently called off when it became known the landslide had blocked the river's flow. The earthquake damaged the railroad station in West Yellowstone and a courthouse in Billings, Montana.

Death toll from the 1959 Yellowstone earthquake
State	Reported deaths	Confirmed deaths	Unaccounted
Montana	0	27	1
Idaho	8	0	0

The earthquake also caused damage and fatalities outside of Montana. In Raynolds Pass in eastern Idaho, a landslide killed eight more people. Seismic waves from the quake were reported in Boise and Macks Inn, Idaho, causing minor well and sewer damage. The final death toll from the earthquake was 28, although some early newspaper reports suggested the death toll could reach as high as 50–60. US$11 million (equivalent to $121.49 million in 2025) in damage was caused.

The quake was felt outside the region. In Salt Lake County, Utah, police officers at the local jail and officials at the Salt Lake Municipal Airport felt the effects of the earthquake. Water levels in wells were affected as far away as Hawaii, 3,200 mi (5,100 km) away, where water in wells fluctuated .10 ft (1.20 in; 0.03 m), and .01 ft (0.120 in; 0.003 m) in Puerto Rico. Levels in nearby Idaho fluctuated as much as 10 ft (3.0 m).

=== Earthquake Lake ===
The landslide caused by the quake blocked the flow of the Madison River, downstream and west of Hebgen Dam. The blockage caused the water to rise and formed a new lake, later named Quake Lake (officially Earthquake Lake). Fearing that the pressure caused by the rising water would result in a catastrophic flood, the Army Corps of Engineers began to cut a 250-foot (76.2 m) wide and 14-foot (4.3 m) deep channel into the slide. By September 10, water began to flow through the channel. To prevent more erosion by the flowing water, the Army Corps cut another 50-foot (15.2 m) channel which was completed on October 29. The construction of the two channels cost US$1.7 million (equivalent to $18.78 million in 2025).

== Aftermath ==
Amateur radio operator Warren Russel, operating radio-station coded K7ICM transmitted news of the quake at 11:43 p.m. (MST). At 11:50 p.m., another amateur (Fr. Francis A. Peterson of St. Anthony in Idaho) contacted the Idaho State Police who in turn contacted their headquarters in Boise. The Montana Highway Patrol, Montana State Civil Defense and the Montana Department of Fish, Wildlife and Parks also received word of the earthquake and its effects. The geography of the area plus the damage from the earthquake disrupted and/or obstructed radio communications, making broadcasting accurate information about the quake's effects difficult.

The Yellowstone County Chapter of the American Red Cross, The Salvation Army, various other local and national organizations, and organizations from multiple states sent aid to the victims of the earthquake. The Red Cross also set up temporary housing in Bozeman and the Wyoming Department of Health sent 200 trailers to the Yellowstone area to be used as hospitals. Because the majority of the roads in and around the Yellowstone area were either damaged or blocked by the landslides and the quake, equipment and personnel from the United States Air Force and the U.S. Forest Service were brought in to transport the injured to nearby hospitals outside the quake zone and to perform search and rescue missions in Madison Canyon. 300 people trapped in the canyon were rescued. Rescuers found five to nine bodies in the earthquake zone. Residents from the town of Ennis were evacuated to Virginia City and Butte.

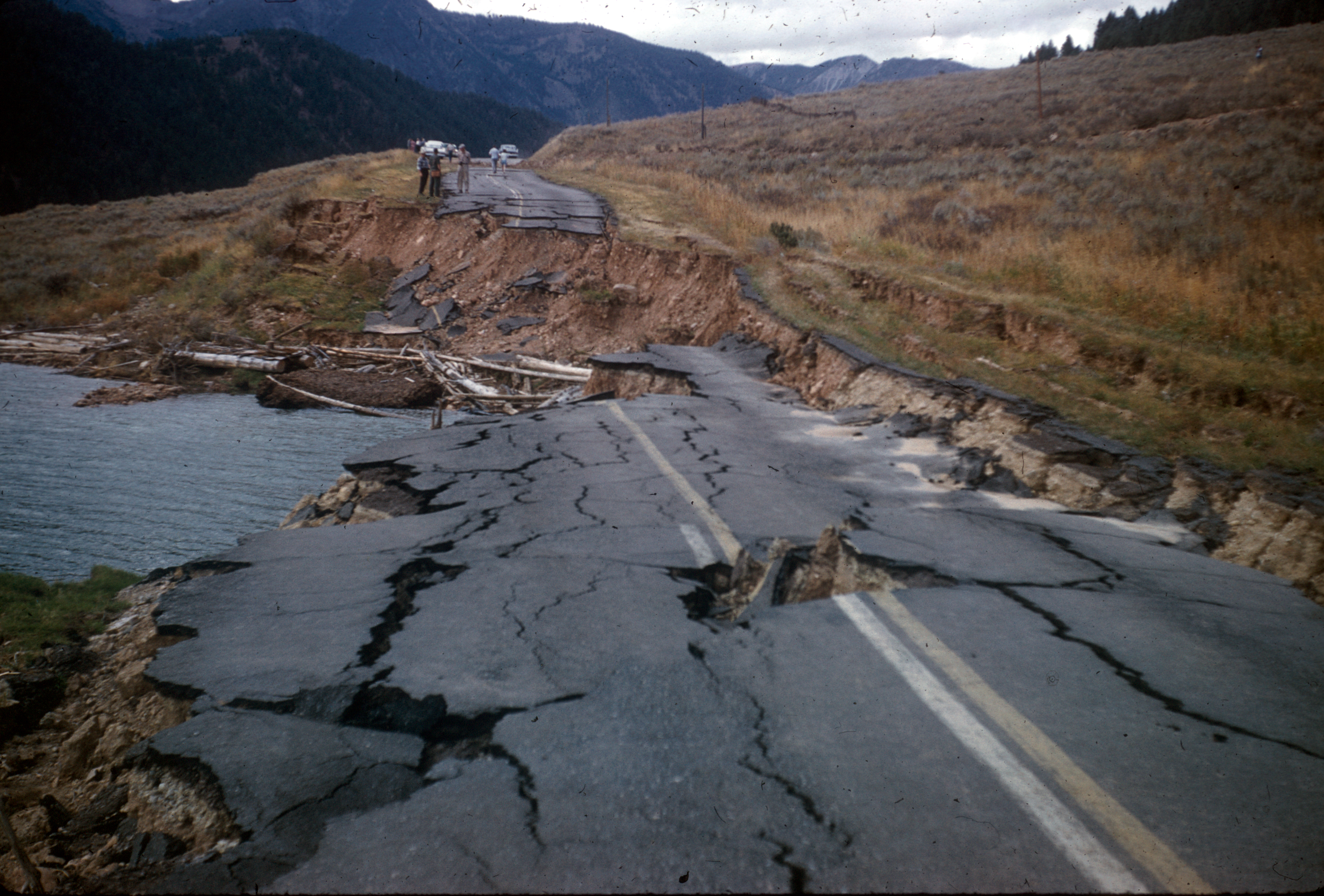
Road damage from the earthquake, 1959 image

Senators and Representatives Frank Moss (D-Utah), John Baldwin (R-California), Harold Johnson (D-California), Lee Metcalf (D-Montana), Leroy Anderson (D-Montana), Tom Morris (D-New Mexico) and Gracie Pfost (D-Idaho) flew over and surveyed the disaster area. The Senate Interior and Insular Affairs Committee requested Montana Governor J. Hugo Aronson to declare the areas hardest hit by the quake a disaster area. Wyoming Governor John J. Hickey provided help and equipment in the aftermath of the quake. The Montana National Guard was called to the quake area to prevent looting of campsites left abandoned by the quake. The Idaho National Guard were also sent to the quake area. The Montana Highway Department began clearing roads of debris and mud. The work was slowed by aftershocks and smaller landslides. On August 19, US Highway 20 and US Highway 191 were reopened while Montana State Highway 1 remained closed. Three bridges in Duck Creek, Cougar Creek and Madison Canyon were repaired and reopened as well. Because of the threat of gasoline spilling into the Missouri River, a local pipeline company built an emergency pumping station. The Montana Power Company surveyed Hebgen Dam and found it sustained minimal damage. Hebgen Lake was completely drained for crewmen to make repairs and to rid it of dead or dying fish. Overall repairs to the Yellowstone National Park amounted to US$2.6 million (equivalent to $28.72 million in 2025).

Fifty people including police officers, members of the Red Cross and others held a memorial service a mile north of the slide in Madison Canyon for campers presumed buried under the quake-induced landslide. The services lasted for 15 minutes. After the quake, the U.S. Forest Service built the Quake Lake visitor center on top of the landslide which was completed in 1967. The U.S. Forest Service placed a plaque on one of the boulders that fell during the quake to honor the 19–21 people who were killed during the quake-induced landslide.

== See also ==
- List of earthquakes in 1959
- List of earthquakes in the United States
- List of earthquakes in Montana
- Yellowstone Caldera
- 1983 Borah Peak earthquake
