= Madison Dam =

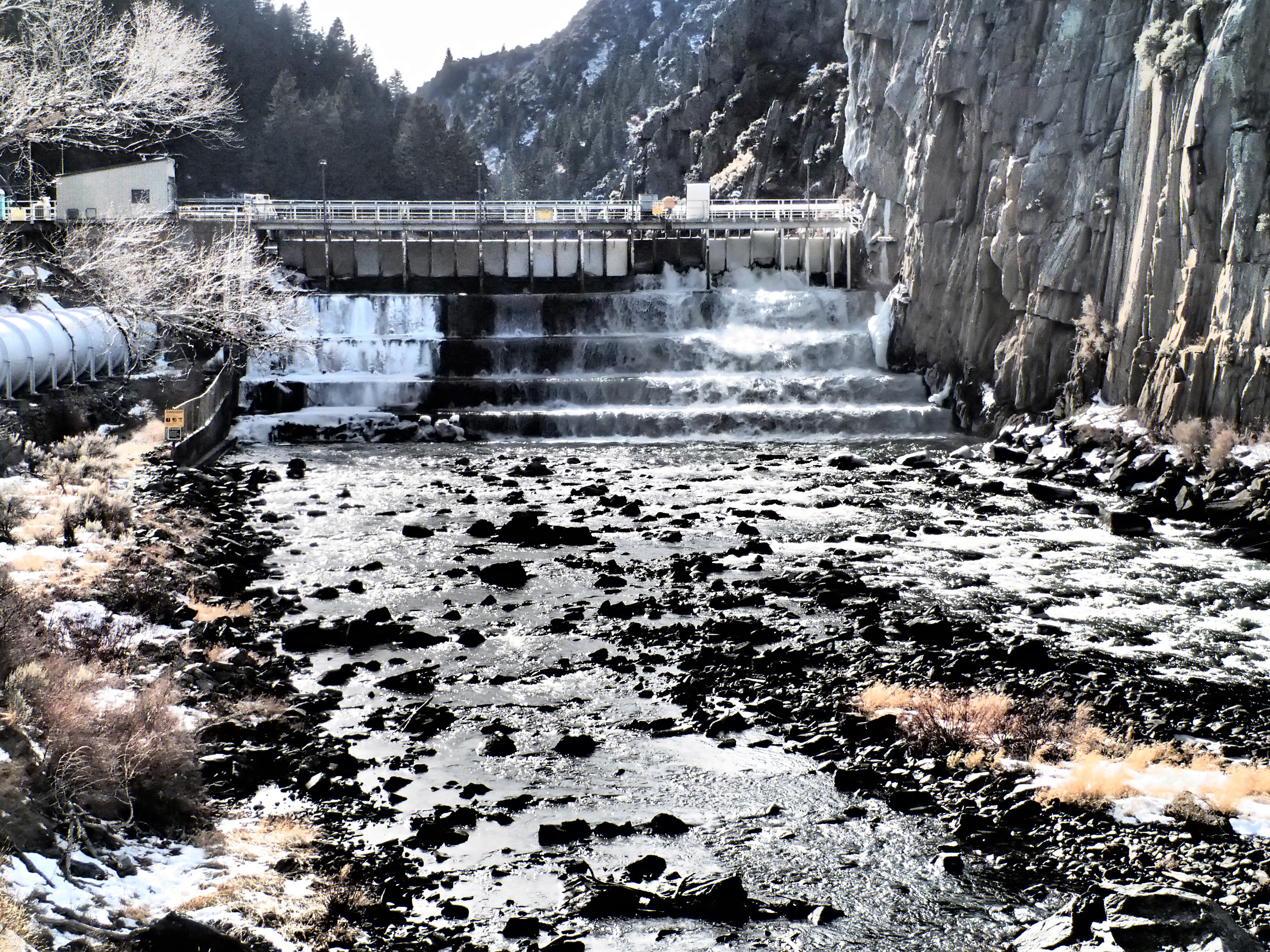
- Madison Dam, January 2015

- Location within Montana Location within the United States
- Country: United States
- Location: Madison County, Montana
- Coordinates: 45°28′12″N 111°38′18″W
- Purpose: Hydroelectric, Flood Control, Water Supply, Recreation
- Opening date: 1906
- Owners: PPL MONTANA, LLC
- Operator: NorthWestern Corporation

Dam and spillways
- Type of dam: Timber crib
- Height: 39 ft (12 m)
- Length: 257 ft (78 m)
- Spillway capacity: 7,700 cubic feet per second (220 m^{3}/s)

Reservoir
- Creates: Ennis Lake
- Total capacity: 42,053 acre⋅ft (51,872,000 m^{3})
- Maximum length: 2.6 mi (4.2 km)
- Normal elevation: 4,820 ft (1,469 m)

Power Station
- Installed capacity: 9 MW

Madison Dam is a hydroelectric dam on the Madison River in Madison County, Montana, in the southwestern part of the state.

The timber-crib dam was constructed in 1906 as a replacement for a similar 1901 dam and powerhouse on the same site. The dam is 39 feet (12 m) high and 257 feet (78 m) long at its crest, placed into the narrows of Bear Trap Canyon. As one of eight PPL Montana hydro projects, it has a generating capacity of 9 megawatts (12,000 hp) in a run-of-the-river configuration. Montana Power Company acquired the dam in 1912 as part of a merger, PPL Corporation purchased it in 1997 and sold it to NorthWestern Corporation in 2014.

The reservoir it creates, Ennis Lake, is 2.6 miles (4.2 km) long and has a maximum storage capacity of 42,053 acre-foot (51,872,000 m^{3}). The lake is relatively shallow and warms significantly during the summer, which tends to decrease fish populations. The lake supports recreational fishing for brown trout and rainbow trout, camping, boating, and white-water rafting in Bear Trap Canyon downstream (north) of the dam.
