= Cochrane Dam =

- Location of Cochrane Dam in Montana
- Country: United States of America
- Location: Cascade County, Montana
- Coordinates: 47°33′11″N 111°08′56″W
- Status: In use
- Opening date: 1958
- Owner: NorthWestern Corporation

Dam and spillways
- Type of dam: Concrete gravity
- Impounds: Missouri River
- Height: 59 ft (18 m)
- Length: 753 ft (230 m)
- Spillways: 1
- Spillway type: Gated service

Reservoir
- Creates: Cochrane Lake
- Total capacity: 2,700 acre⋅ft (3,300,000 m^{3})
- Catchment area: 24,000 sq mi (62,000 km^{2})
- Surface area: 218 acres (88 ha)

Power Station
- Turbines: 2
- Installed capacity: 64 MW
- Annual generation: 298,390,000 KWh (2009)

Cochrane Dam is a run-of-the river hydroelectric dam on the Missouri River, about 8 miles (13 km) northeast of Great Falls in the U.S. state of Montana. The dam has a concrete gravity design and is 59 feet (18 m) high and 753 feet (230 m) long. Its power station has two generators capable of producing 64 megawatts. Construction of the dam was finished in 1958. Montana Power Company originally built the dam, PPL Corporation purchased it in 1997 and sold it to NorthWestern Corporation in 2014.
