= List of earthquakes in Montana =

This is an incomplete list of earthquakes in the U.S state of Montana. Only earthquakes with a magnitude of 6.0 or greater are listed. Aftershocks are not included, unless they were of great significance or contributed to a death toll.

== Earthquakes ==
Date	Location	Mag.	MMI	Deaths	Injuries	Damage / notes	Ref
1959-08-18	Hebgen Lake	7.2 M_{w}	IX	28+		$11 million	
1935-10-31	Helena	6.0 M_{w}	VIII	2		Aftershock.	
1935-10-18	Helena	6.2 M_{s}	VIII	2			
1925-06-27	Townsend	6.9 M_{w}	IX		2	$150,000	
1897-11-04	Dillon	6.4 M_{w}					
Note: The inclusion criteria for adding events are based on WikiProject Earthquakes' notability guideline that was developed for stand-alone articles. The principles described also apply to lists. In summary, only damaging, injurious, or deadly events and those of scientific interest should be recorded.

== See also ==
- List of earthquakes in the United States
- List of earthquakes in Utah
- List of earthquakes in Nevada
