= First Baptist Church of Montana (Helena, Montana) =

Coordinates: 46°35′20″N 112°02′06″W

First Baptist Church
- First Baptist Church
- Location: 201 8th Avenue, Helena, Montana
- Country: USA
- Denomination: Baptist

History
- Founded: December 5, 1880

The First Baptist Church of Montana, located in Helena, Montana, is an historic church founded in 1880. It is Montana's oldest Baptist Church, located on 8th Avenue. It is associated with the American Baptist Churches USA.

The First Baptist Church in Montana had its beginnings on November 7, 1879, when 21 Helena Baptists petitioned the Baptist Home Mission Society of New York City to send a missionary to organize a church. Reverend J.T. Mason arrived for that purpose; and on December 5, 1880, he moderated an organizational meeting of Baptists in the wooden Lewis and Clark Courthouse. Services were first held in a hall on Broadway Avenue and later in the South Methodist Church in the 100 block of North Warren. In 1882 the current building site was purchased for $1,000 and the cornerstone was laid September 19, 1883. The Montana Baptist Association (Montana Baptist Convention) was organized in the uncompleted church building in 1883.

In 1884, the $11,000 building was dedicated. Soon afterwards, a $2,500 parsonage was built at the back of the church. Reverend J.T. Mason preached the first sermon in the new church on April 6, 1884. Among the early members was Territorial governor Preston Leslie whose daughter, Emily, served as church organist. The fine Barckhoff tracker organ, still in use today, was given in her memory in 1901 which was hand pumped until 1906.

A spiral stairway from the northwest front vestibule to the parlors over the lecture room (now the balcony) is an original feature of the building. The platform under the pulpit opened to reveal the baptistry which was first used on June 25, 1884. The chandelier in the center of the sanctuary had gas light tapers until 1889, when the trustees were empowered to replace coal oil lamps with electricity. In 1936 the clear glass windows were replaced with amber glass. The original pews had perforated backs with comfortable cushions; and extensions at each end, when drawn to full length, allowed the whole area of the floor to be used.

In 1916 a fire damaged the entire auditorium, including considerable damage to the organ. The congregation met in the Christian Church until October. The second parsonage at 515 North Rodney was sold and the money used to repair the organ.

In 1935 the red brick veneer finish was damaged in a series of earthquakes so it was covered with stucco, the interior redecorated and the parsonage was reconstructed into an education unit with a kitchen and fellowship room.

A stained glass window is dedicated to Governor Sam C. Ford (1941-1949) whose wife, Mary, was a lifetime member of the congregation. In 1956 the spire was rebuilt to look as it does today.

In 1965 a number of renovations were made, including an addition of 11,000 square feet for new classrooms, kitchen, offices, a new 8th St. entrance, and the fellowship hall seating 250 persons. The old parsonage wing then became the Ann Judson Room, baptismal dressing rooms, and classrooms. In addition all the rectangular stained glass windows were installed, thus changing the 8th St. side of the building.

In 1977 the third baptistry was installed replacing the badly deteriorated baptistry and its "floating steps" with a larger fiberglass unit. The wall above it was tiled at this time and a larger opening was created.

In 1979 the Barckhoff tracker organ was completely dismantled and cleaned, and the organ chamber was replastered and painted for the first time since the fire of 1916.

In 1980, the sanctuary underwent its fourth renovation.
