= Firehole Ranch =

Coordinates: 44°48′50″N 111°17′27″W

Firehole Ranch is a private 640-acre guest ranch located on Hebgen Lake in Gallatin County, Montana.

Owned and operated by Lynda Caine since 1999, Firehole Ranch was founded in the late 1890s as Watkins Creek Ranch by George S. Watkins. Originally much larger, Watkins Creek Ranch sold much of its land to the Madison Power and Light Company in 1904 to make way for the Hebgen Lake Dam. Much of Watkins’ cattle were sold to Yellowstone National Park while the remaining land was converted into a dude ranch.

Firehole Ranch was entered into the National Register of Historic Places under the name Watkins Creek Ranch on December 27, 2006.
