= Joseph Sherburne =

American merchant and trader who did business with native Americans

Joseph Herbert Sherburne
- Born: December 12, 1850; Phillips, Maine, United States
- Died: September 11, 1938 (aged 87); Browning, Montana
- Occupations: Businessman, merchant
- Known for: Trading with multiple tribal groups in Oklahoma and leadership of the Sherburne Mercantile Company in Browning
- Spouse: Gertrude Lockley (m. 1879)
- Children: 6

Joseph Herbert Sherburne (1850-1938) was an American businessman and merchant who established several businesses in Browning, Montana including the Mercantile Company and the first bank. He started his career operating a trading post and trading with tribal groups in Oklahoma, before moving to Montana.

Sherburne and his wife became actively involved in Browning society. His company achieved the first successful oil drilling operation in Montana, located in the Swift Current Valley near Sherburne Lake which was later named after him.

== Early life ==
Sherburne was born December 12, 1850, in Phillips, Maine, to Joseph and Betsy Sherburne. Sherburne left school when he was 15 years old and moved to Minnesota to work with his uncle on the state's first railroad.

== Career ==
Sometime between 1866 and 1876 Sherburne relocated to Arkansas City, Kansas, working as a druggist, miller, and storekeeper. While working as a shopkeeper in Arkansas City, he began trading with multiple tribal groups in Oklahoma to acquire buffalo hides. He then sold the hides in St. Louis, Missouri.

In 1876 Sherburne established a trading post, under federal license, to solidify his business relations with the Ponca and other Indian tribes in the Oklahoma Territory. In 1879, Joseph Sherburne married Gertrude Lockley. The Sherburnes began their family in the Oklahoma Territory but encountered several hardships in operating the trading post. After the failure of a cattle ranching venture, Joseph temporarily moved back to Arkansas City and opened both real estate and insurance businesses to pay off his debts. The following spring he sold his land interests in the Oklahoma Territory to a larger ranching operation, subcontracting to process and market their beef for Indian agencies throughout the region.

Joseph Sherburne continued to conduct various trading operations with the Indian tribes of the Oklahoma Territory until 1895. Joseph Sherburne made several trips to Montana and eventually decided to relocate his family and business interests to the Blackfeet Reservation. At the time James and Joseph Kipp, Blackfeet tribal members, owned and operated a general store in Browning, Montana. The Kipps' business closed late in 1895 and Joseph Sherburne established a trading post and general store at Browning in the spring of 1896.

Under Joseph Sherburne's leadership the Sherburne Mercantile Company grew to be the economic and social center of Browning. The thriving business included real estate, banking, telephone communications, and Northern Pacific Railway commissary supply. The Northern Pacific line had been completed in 1891. The Sherburne Mercantile "loan department" and its assets served as the foundation for the First National Bank of Browning, opened in 1917. Joseph Sherburne was also heavily involved with mineral and oil speculation along the Rocky Mountain eastern front range of Montana. He was an officer of the Swift Current Oil, Land, and Power Company. This company achieved the first successful oil drilling operation in Montana, located in the Swift Current Valley near the lake now known as Sherburne Lake. The Sherburne Mercantile also opened branch stores in Babb, Montana, and in the newly designated Glacier National Park. The majority of Park lands were formerly part of the Blackfeet Reservation and were purchased by the U.S. government in the 1895, justified partly in response to mining claim pressures and partly to supplement the economic resources of the Blackfeet tribe.

== Personal life and death ==
His wife Gertrude Sherburne and their six children, Joseph Lockely VIII, Frank Ponca, Hazel, Arthur, Agnes and Theodosia, arrived at Browning in June, but only remained in Montana for the summer months. Though Joseph Sherburne hired his nephew, Walter Shepard, to serve as a temporary schoolteacher until a formal schoolhouse in Browning could be built, Mrs. Sherburne relocated the children to a family house in Minneapolis, Minnesota every school year until the early 1900s. She and the children spent their summers in Montana.

Both Joseph and Gertrude Sherburne were actively involved in Browning society and used the mercantile as a meeting place. Browning's first school was established in the Sherburne's home, which was attached to the Mercantile. Gertrude organized Montana's first Red Cross chapter in 1917 and participated in numerous civic events and organizations. Joseph was an active Montana Republican Party supporter and was a member of the Masons. Both were very active in the local Presbyterian Church.

Gertrude Lockley Sherburne died in Browning in 1935. Joseph Herbert Sherburne died in Browning on September 11, 1938 at the age of 87.
