= Madison River =

River in Wyoming and Montana, United States

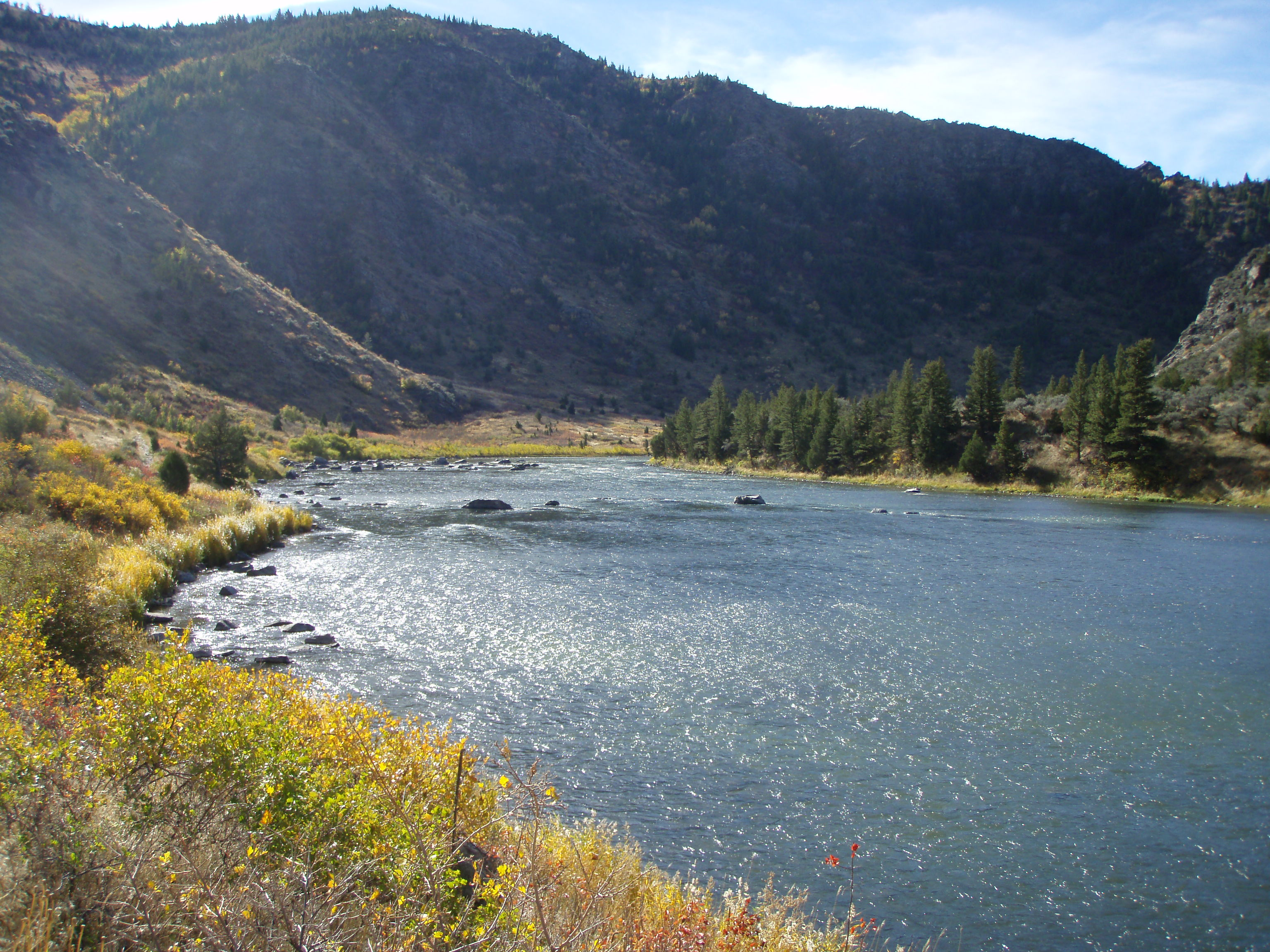
- The Madison River In Bear Trap Canyon Below Ennis, Montana

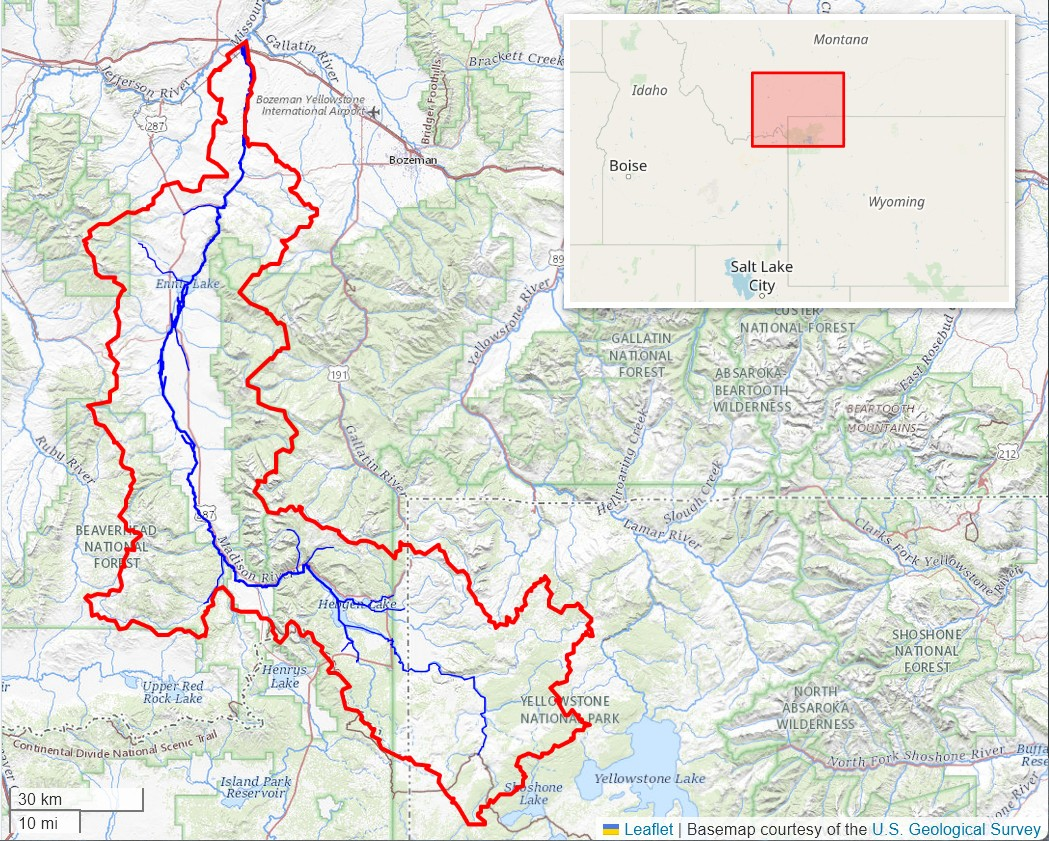
- Madison River watershed (Interactive map)

Location
- Country: United States
- State: Wyoming and Montana

Physical characteristics
- Source: Madison Junction
  - location: Yellowstone National Park, Wyoming
  - coordinates: 44°38′32″N 110°51′56″W
- Mouth: Missouri River
  - location: Three Forks, Montana
  - coordinates: 45°55′39″N 111°30′29″W
- Length: 183 mi (295 km)
- Discharge
  - location: near Three Forks
  - average: 1,647 cu ft/s (46.6 m^{3}/s)

Basin features
- Tributaries
  - left: Firehole River
  - right: Gibbon River

The Madison River is a headwater tributary of the Missouri River, approximately 183 miles (295 km) long, in Wyoming and Montana. Its confluence with the Jefferson and Gallatin rivers near Three Forks, Montana forms the Missouri River.

== Course ==
Madison River flowing through Yellowstone National Park at dusk

The Madison River begins in Teton County, Wyoming at the confluence of the Firehole and Gibbon rivers in Yellowstone National Park, a location known as Madison Junction. It flows west out of the park and into Montana, turning north through the Rocky Mountains of southwestern Montana to join the Jefferson and Gallatin rivers at Three Forks. The Missouri River Headwaters State Park lies at this confluence.

=== Dams and Lakes ===
In its upper reaches in Gallatin County, Montana, the Hebgen Dam forms Hebgen Lake. Downstream of Hebgen Dam, the 1959 Hebgen Lake earthquake led to the formation of Quake Lake, a naturally dammed body of water that remains part of the river’s hydrology. In its middle course, the Madison Dam in Madison County, Montana creates Ennis Lake. These reservoirs and lakes regulate flow, support recreation, and are associated with hydroelectric power infrastructure (see Natural Resources).

== History ==
Course of the Madison River into Hebgen Lake, with Yellowstone Airport on the right

The river was named in July 1805 by Meriwether Lewis at Three Forks. The central fork of the three, it was named for U.S. Secretary of State James Madison, who later succeeded Thomas Jefferson as President in 1809. The western fork, the largest, was named for President Jefferson and the east fork for Treasury Secretary Albert Gallatin.

On August 17, 1959, a massive earthquake near Hebgen Lake triggered a landslide that blocked the Madison River, forming Quake Lake. The quake, known as the 1959 Hebgen Lake earthquake, measured 7.3 to 7.5 on the Richter scale and caused significant loss of life and property damage in the area.

== Recreation ==
The Madison is a class I river in Montana for the purposes of access for recreational use.

The Bear Trap Canyon section downstream from Ennis and Ennis Lake is known for its class IV–V whitewater, drawing experienced paddlers during seasonal flows.

== Ecology ==
The Madison River is widely regarded as one of the finest trout fisheries in the world. It is classified as a blue ribbon fishery in Montana, where fly fisherman target brown trout, rainbow trout, cutthroat trout, and mountain whitefish.

Grizzly bears and wolves reintroduced to Yellowstone National Park roam the river valley.

=== Fish Species ===
Bison tracks along the river bank

According to Montana Fish, Wildlife & Parks, the Madison River supports many fish species, reflecting its varied aquatic habitats and long history of fisheries management. Both coldwater and warmwater species are present, including several native salmonids such as Arctic grayling, mountain whitefish, and westslope cutthroat trout. Introduced species like brown trout, rainbow trout, and brook trout are also well established and widely targeted by anglers. In addition to trout, the river sustains native suckers, minnows, and sculpin, contributing to the ecological complexity of the watershed. The following table provides an overview of representative fish species recorded in the Madison River.

Fish species found in the Madison River
Common name	Scientific name	Group	Water Type	Origin
Arctic Grayling	Thymallus arcticus	Trout	Coldwater	Native
Brook Trout	Salvelinus fontinalis	Trout	Coldwater	Introduced
Brown Trout	Salmo trutta	Trout	Coldwater	Introduced
Common Carp	Cyprinus carpio	Minnow	Warmwater	Introduced
Longnose Dace	Rhinichthys cataractae	Minnow	Warmwater	Native
Longnose Sucker	Catostomus catostomus	Sucker	Warmwater	Native
Mottled Sculpin	Cottus bairdii	Sculpin		Native
Mountain Sucker	Catostomus platyrhynchus	Sucker		Native
Mountain Whitefish	Prosopium williamsoni	Trout	Coldwater	Native
Rainbow Trout	Oncorhynchus mykiss	Trout	Coldwater	Introduced
Stonecat	Noturus flavus	Catfish		Native
Utah Chub	Gila atraria	Minnow		Introduced
Westslope Cutthroat Trout	Oncorhynchus lewisi	Trout	Coldwater	Native
White Sucker	Catostomus commersonii	Sucker	Warmwater	Native
Yellowstone Cutthroat Trout	Oncorhynchus clarkii bouvieri	Trout	Coldwater	Native

== See also ==
- Angling in Yellowstone National Park
- Fishes of Yellowstone National Park
- Montana Stream Access Law
- List of rivers of Montana
- List of Wyoming rivers

== Sources ==
- Back, Howard (1938). The Waters of the Yellowstone with Rod and Fly. New York, NY: Dodd & Mead.
- Parks, Richard (1998). Fishing Yellowstone National Park. Helena, MT: Falcon Press. ISBN 1-56044-625-0.
- Brooks, Charles E. (1979). The Living River: A fisherman's intimate profile of the Madison River watershed – its history, ecology, lore, and angling opportunities. Garden City, NJ: Nick Lyons Books. ISBN 0-385-15655-3.
- Mathews, Craig; Molinero, Clayton (1997). The Yellowstone Fly-Fishing Guide: A[n] authoritative guide to the waters of Yellowstone National Park. Guilford, CT: The Lyons Press. ISBN 1-55821-545-X.
- Brooks, Charles E. (1984). Fishing Yellowstone Waters. Clinton, NJ: New Win Publishing Inc. ISBN 0-8329-0353-1.
- Holt, John (1996). Montana Fly-Fishing Guide. Vol. East. Guilford, CT: The Lyons Press. ISBN 1-58574-529-4.
- Holt, John (1993). River Journal. Vol. Madison. Portland, OR: Frank Amato Publications. ISBN 1-878175-27-0.
- Staples, Bruce; Jacklin, Bob (2021). Fly Fishing West Yellowstone: A history and guide. Guilford, CT: Stackpole Books. ISBN 9780811738255.
