= Hebgen Dam =

Dam in Gallatin County, Montana, United States

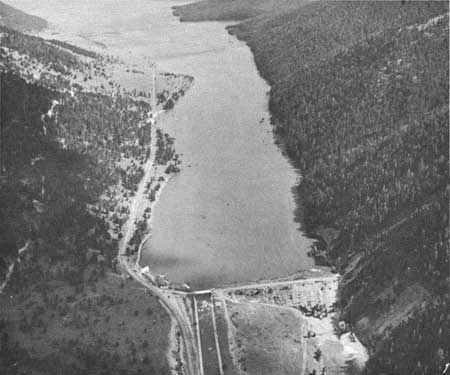
- The damaged Hebgen Dam in 1959

- Location in the United States Location in Montana
- Official name: Hebgen Dam
- Location: Gallatin County, Montana
- Coordinates: 44°51′49″N 111°20′08″W
- Opening date: 1914
- Owner: NorthWestern Corporation

Dam and spillways
- Type of dam: Concrete-core, earthen embankment
- Impounds: Madison River
- Height: 85 feet (26 m)
- Length: 721 feet (220 m)
- Spillway type: Chute, gate-controlled

Reservoir
- Creates: Hebgen Lake
- Total capacity: 325,000 acre⋅ft (0.401 km^{3})
- Catchment area: 905 square miles (2,340 km^{2})
- Surface area: 21 square miles (54 km^{2})
- Normal elevation: 6,535 feet (1,992 m)

The Hebgen Dam is a concrete-core earthen embankment dam in the western United States, located on the Madison River in southwestern Montana. The dam is 85 feet (26 m) tall and 721 feet (220 m) in length; its purpose is to store and regulate water for other downstream reservoirs and hydroelectric power plants. Montana Power Company originally built the dam, PPL Corporation purchased it in 1997 and sold it to NorthWestern Corporation in 2014.

== History ==
Hebgen Dam was built across the Madison River in 1914 by Montana Power Company to create Hebgen Lake.

During the 7.5 magnitude 1959 Hebgen Lake earthquake in mid-August, the dam was damaged, primarily due to intense ground movement that led to water surging over the dam crest four different times. It was repaired several weeks later. The epicenter of the quake was determined to be 20 miles (32 km) beneath the bottom of Hebgen Lake. Seismologists reported it to be the fourth largest quake recorded in the United States up to that time.

On August 30, 2008, two of the dam's four hydraulic gates failed, releasing 3,400 cubic feet (96 m^{3}) per second of water into the Madison River. The normal discharge of the dam is 900 cubic feet (25 m^{3}) per second and the gate failure caused a 1-foot rise in the river.

On November 30, 2021, the hydraulic gates failed again causing downstream flows to rapidly drop. Nearby locals quickly organized an effort to rescue stranded fish trapped in pools in the side channels. An ongoing lawsuit against Northwestern Energy (as of 2024) claims that NWE failed in its requirement to keep streamflows above 150 CFS.

== Climate ==
Climate data for Hebgen Dam, Montana, 1991–2020 normals, 1904–2020 extremes: 6489ft (1978m)
Month	Jan	Feb	Mar	Apr	May	Jun	Jul	Aug	Sep	Oct	Nov	Dec	Year
Record high °F (°C)	45 (7)	49 (9)	60 (16)	75 (24)	88 (31)	96 (36)	98 (37)	94 (34)	93 (34)	82 (28)	62 (17)	51 (11)	98 (37)
Mean maximum °F (°C)	35.2 (1.8)	40.5 (4.7)	51.4 (10.8)	62.9 (17.2)	74.3 (23.5)	81.6 (27.6)	88.0 (31.1)	87.3 (30.7)	81.8 (27.7)	68.2 (20.1)	49.1 (9.5)	36.7 (2.6)	88.5 (31.4)
Mean daily maximum °F (°C)	22.9 (−5.1)	27.9 (−2.3)	38.4 (3.6)	46.8 (8.2)	58.4 (14.7)	68.4 (20.2)	78.7 (25.9)	78.0 (25.6)	67.7 (19.8)	50.7 (10.4)	34.0 (1.1)	22.7 (−5.2)	49.6 (9.7)
Daily mean °F (°C)	13.2 (−10.4)	16.5 (−8.6)	26.1 (−3.3)	35.0 (1.7)	45.4 (7.4)	53.7 (12.1)	61.7 (16.5)	60.7 (15.9)	52.4 (11.3)	39.4 (4.1)	26.0 (−3.3)	14.3 (−9.8)	37.0 (2.8)
Mean daily minimum °F (°C)	3.5 (−15.8)	5.1 (−14.9)	13.8 (−10.1)	23.3 (−4.8)	32.3 (0.2)	38.9 (3.8)	44.6 (7.0)	43.4 (6.3)	37.2 (2.9)	28.2 (−2.1)	17.9 (−7.8)	5.8 (−14.6)	24.5 (−4.2)
Mean minimum °F (°C)	−23.9 (−31.1)	−24.1 (−31.2)	−10.8 (−23.8)	6.8 (−14.0)	20.6 (−6.3)	29.5 (−1.4)	36.6 (2.6)	35.2 (1.8)	26.2 (−3.2)	13.1 (−10.5)	−1.4 (−18.6)	−18.5 (−28.1)	−29.4 (−34.1)
Record low °F (°C)	−47 (−44)	−60 (−51)	−38 (−39)	−20 (−29)	8 (−13)	19 (−7)	25 (−4)	12 (−11)	6 (−14)	−9 (−23)	−35 (−37)	−43 (−42)	−60 (−51)
Average precipitation inches (mm)	3.06 (78)	2.76 (70)	2.17 (55)	2.28 (58)	3.14 (80)	2.99 (76)	1.62 (41)	1.38 (35)	1.59 (40)	2.08 (53)	2.49 (63)	3.07 (78)	28.63 (727)
Average snowfall inches (cm)	43.80 (111.3)	33.70 (85.6)	20.60 (52.3)	7.70 (19.6)	1.20 (3.0)	0.00 (0.00)	0.00 (0.00)	0.00 (0.00)	0.00 (0.00)	4.10 (10.4)	20.90 (53.1)	45.20 (114.8)	177.2 (450.1)
Source 1: NOAA
Source 2: XMACIS2 (records & monthly max/mins)

== See also ==
1959 Hebgen Lake earthquake
