= 1925 Montana earthquake =

1925 earthquake in Montana

- Location within Montana
- UTC time: 1925-06-28 01:21:12
- ISC event: 910562
- USGS-ANSS: ComCat
- Local date: 27 June 1925
- Local time: 17:21:12
- Magnitude: 6.9 M_{s}
- Depth: 15 km (9 mi)
- Epicenter: 46.37°N 111.41°W
- Areas affected: Montana, United States
- Total damage: $150 thousand
- Max. intensity: MMI IX (Violent)
- Foreshocks: 1 possible, magnitude unknown
- Aftershocks: 75+
- Casualties: 2 injured

The 1925 Montana (Clarkston Valley) earthquake occurred at 17:21:12 MDT on 27 June in Montana, with the epicenter being located near Townsend. The earthquake had a magnitude of 6.9 in the surface-wave magnitude scale. A maximum intensity of IX (Violent) was observed. Serious damage was reported near the epicenter. 3 hours after the mainshock, a strong aftershock was recorded with an unknown magnitude that also caused damage.

== Tectonic setting ==
The epicenter area, Clarkston Valley is a valley surrounded by mountains of severely folded Mesozoic and older rocks and floored with tertiary lake beds and recent alluvium. Physiographic evidences indicate that the Clarkston Valley is a structural depression on the east by a fault of post-Miocene age. Presumably the origin of the earthquake was on this fault at a considerable depth below the surface. In the neighborhood of Deer Lodge several faults of apparently small extent that trend northwestward are mapped by the geologists of the Anaconda Copper Mining. Their age and displacement are not known. In the hills west of Missouri River is an overthrust fault, called the Lombard overthrust, that extends from a point north of Three Forks northeastward for 13 miles. Its trace crosses Horseshoe Bend about a mile west of Lombard.

== Earthquake ==
The earthquake struck at 6:21 in the evening local time (June 28 at 01:21 UTC) with the epicenter being located right near Townsend. The earthquake had an intensity of IX (Violent), and was felt in Oregon, Idaho, Wyoming, Washington in the United States and British Columbia, Saskatchewan, Alberta in Canada. Despite the intensity, there were no deaths since back then the area was sparsely populated and the property damage didn't exceed US$ 150,000.

== Impact ==
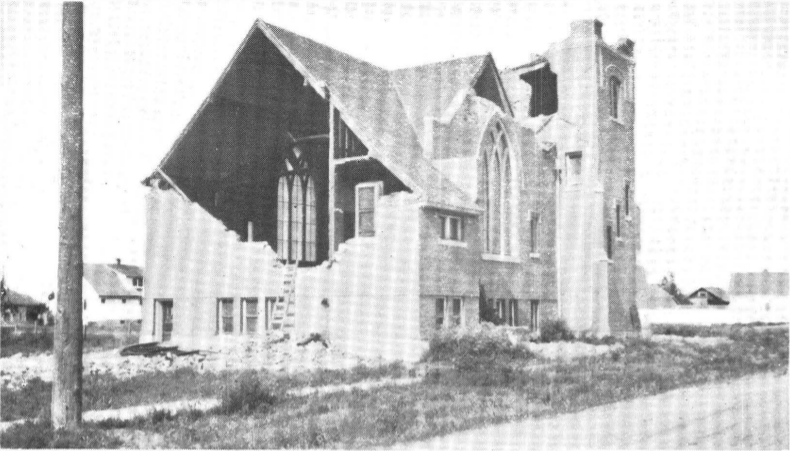
A damaged church in Three Forks, Montana following the earthquake

A school in Manhattan was damaged beyond repair as well as other schools in Willow Creek, Bozeman and Radersburg being seriously damaged, along with many brick, stone and cement buildings including a church at Three Forks, Logan and a court house in White Sulphur Springs. Many buildings were damaged, pavements were cracked, windows were broken and chimneys toppled as a result of the earthquake. The shaking triggered landslides along the Missouri River which blocked railroad traffic for several weeks.

=== Casualties ===
Even though there were no deaths from the earthquake, at least two people were injured including a woman who broke her leg while rushing out of her home.

== See also ==
- List of earthquakes in 1925
- List of earthquakes in Montana
- List of earthquakes in the United States
