= Lake Sherburne =

Reservoir in Montana, U.S.

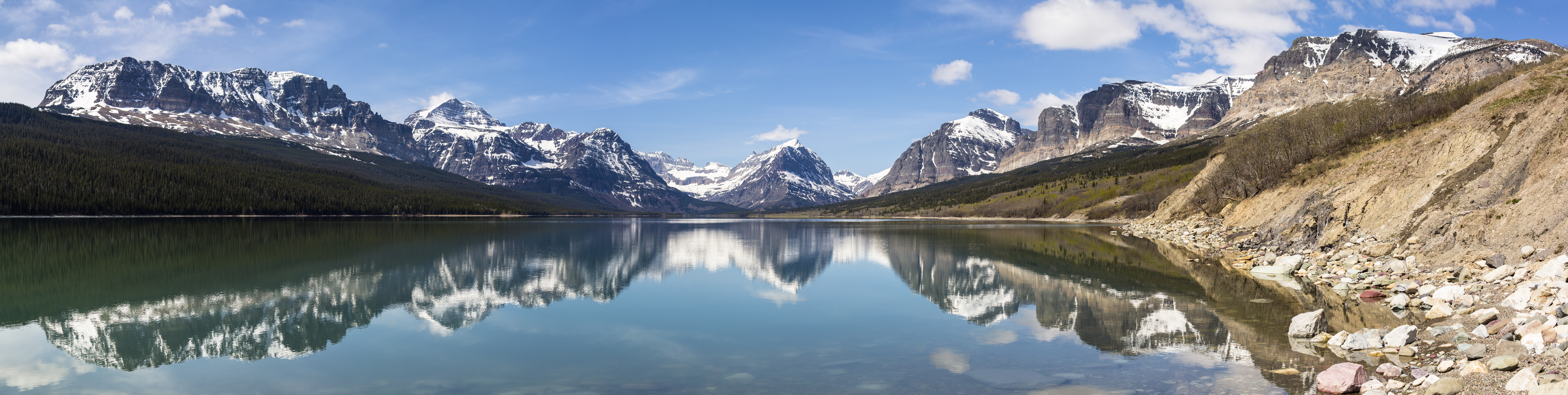

- Location within Montana Location within the United States
- Location: Glacier National Park (U.S.), Glacier County, Montana
- Coordinates: 48°48′54″N 113°34′48″W
- Type: Manmade
- Primary inflows: Swiftcurrent Creek
- Primary outflows: Swiftcurrent Creek
- Basin countries: United States
- Max. length: 6 mi (9.7 km)
- Max. width: 0.8 mi (1.3 km)
- Surface elevation: 4,788 ft (1,459 m)

Lake Sherburne is a reservoir impounded by Lake Sherburne Dam in the Many Glacier region of Glacier National Park, Montana. The dam was constructed between 1914 and 1921 on Swiftcurrent Creek, flooding 6 miles (9.7 km) of natural lakes and highly productive riparian and wetland areas. The reservoir is the principal water storage component of the Bureau of Reclamation's Milk River Project, which provides irrigation water to north central Montana farms.

Due to its fluctuating water levels, Lake Shelburne supports very little vegetation along its shoreline. However, trumpeter swans are often observed along the lake in the spring and fall. The lake is considered weak for fishing, but brook trout and northern pike can be caught there. There is no public boat launch on the lake.

The name Lake Sherburne is derived from an early settler and businessman in the area, Joseph H. Sherburne. He settled in the area (Browning) in 1896 and was the proprietor of the Sherburne Mercantile Company which had stores in towns in the area Browning, Babb and East Glacier. During this time he had a cabin for summer use by his family on the shore of what became known as Sherburne Lakes (plural). Once the dam was built in 1919 the name was revised to Lake Sherburne.

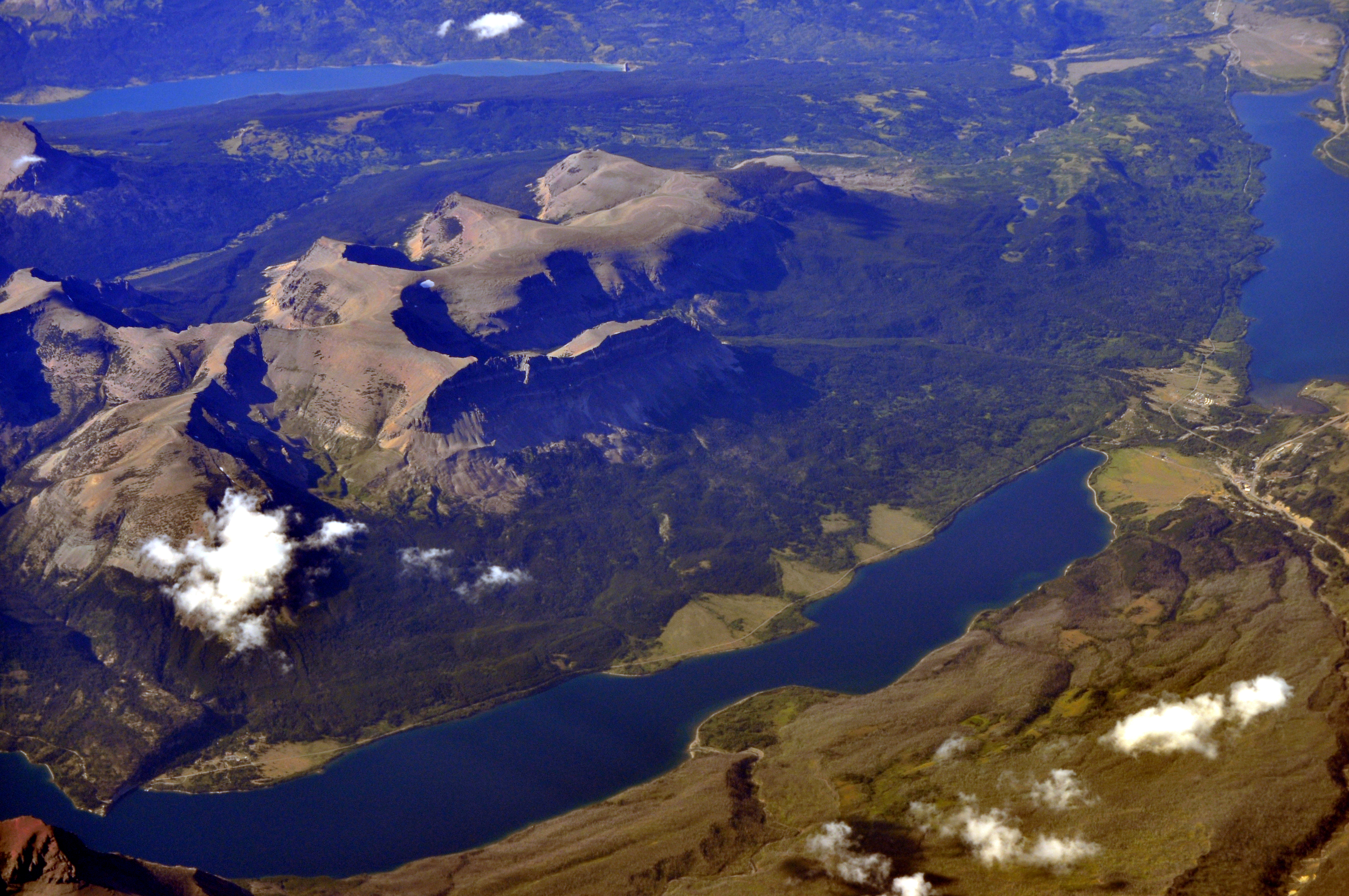
Lake Sherburne (bottom)

== See also ==
- List of lakes in Glacier County, Montana
- Glacier View Dam, a project proposed in the 1940s
