= Quake Lake =

Lake in southwestern Montana, United States

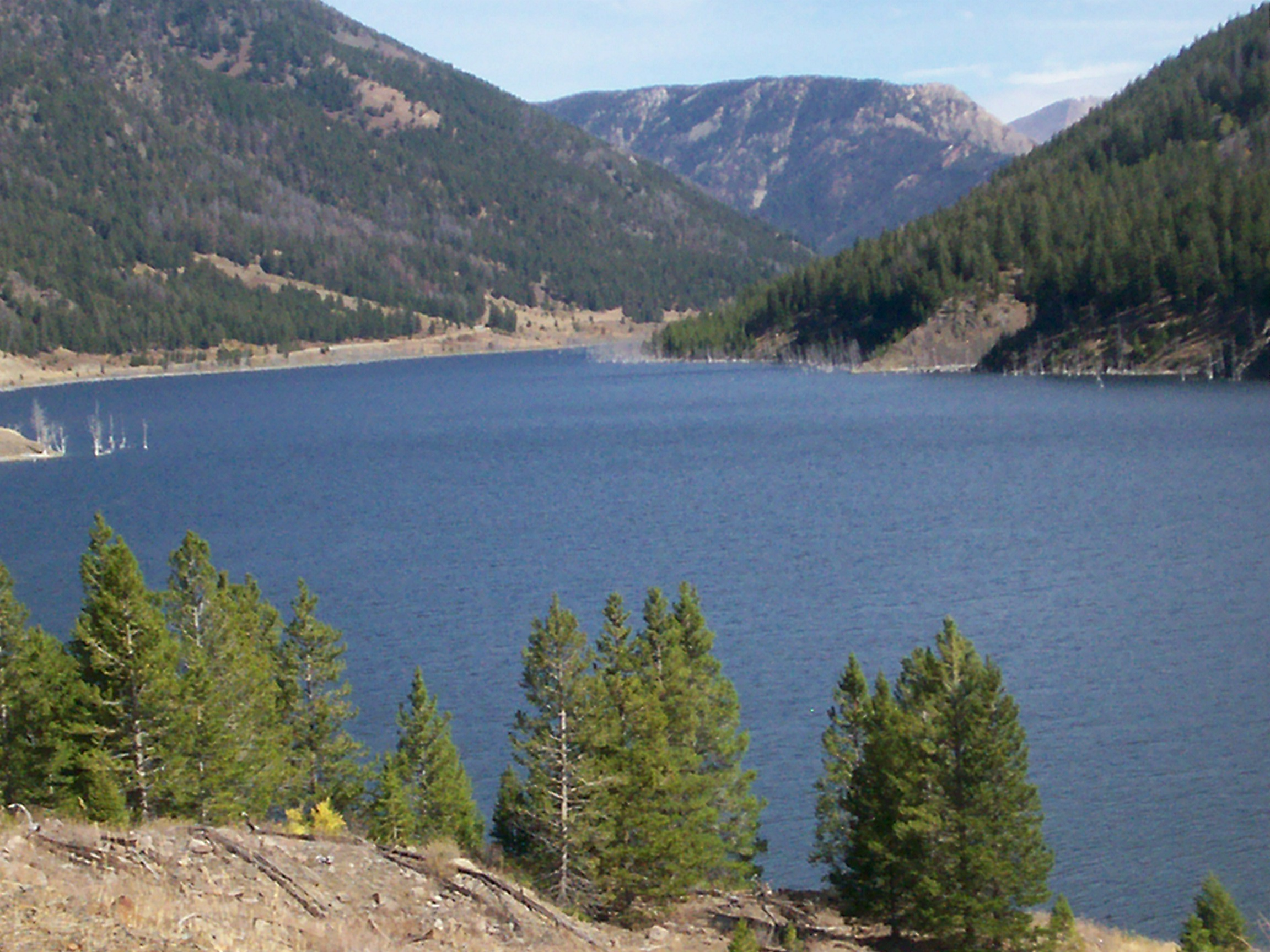

- Location in the United States Location in Montana
- Location: Madison / Gallatin counties, Montana, United States
- Coordinates: 44°51′10″N 111°23′20″W
- Type: Natural/Fresh Water Lake
- Primary inflows: Madison River
- Primary outflows: Madison River
- Basin countries: United States
- Max. length: 6 mi (9.7 km)
- Max. width: 0.25 mi (0.40 km)
- Surface area: 611.8 acres (247.6 ha)
- Average depth: 47.2 ft (14.4 m)
- Max. depth: 124.88 ft (38.06 m)
- Water volume: 26,555 acre⋅ft (32,755,000 m^{3})
- Surface elevation: 6,391 ft (1,948 m)

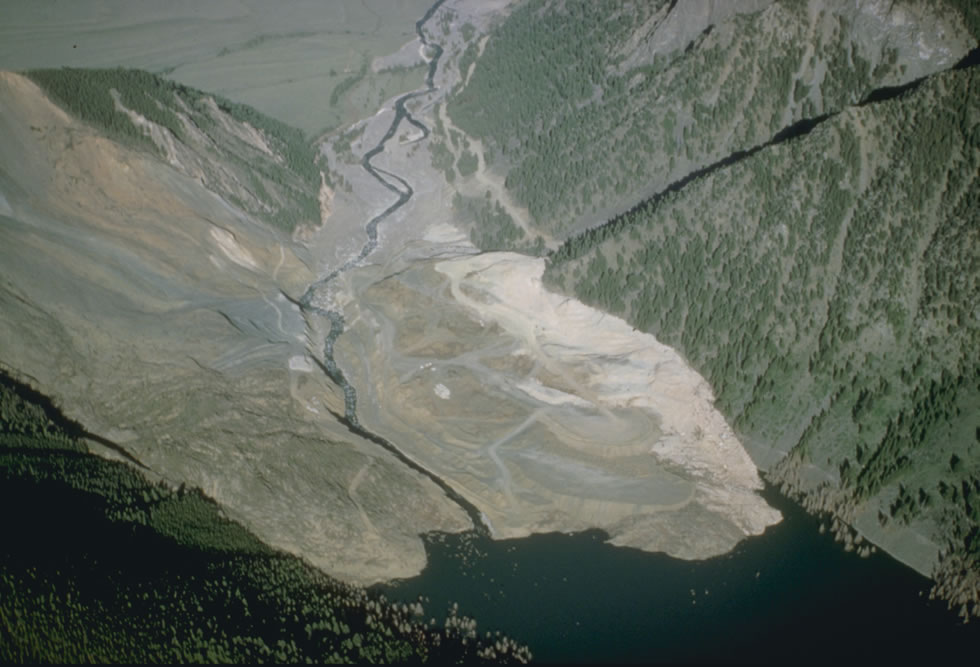
Landslide at Quake Lake United States Geological Survey

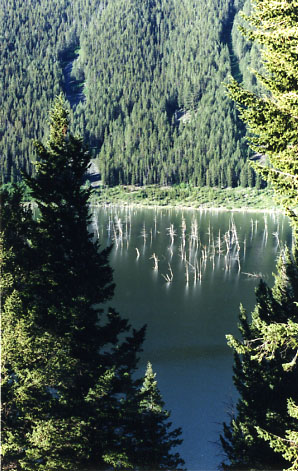
Quake Lake from overlook

Quake Lake (officially Earthquake Lake) is a lake in the western United States, on the Madison River in southwestern Montana. It was created after an earthquake struck on August 17, 1959, with 28 fatalities. Northwest of West Yellowstone, Quake Lake is six miles (10 km) in length with a maximum depth of 125 feet (38 m).

U.S. Route 287 follows the lake and offers glimpses of the effects of the earthquake and landslide, and a visitor center is just off the road. The lake is mostly within Gallatin National Forest.

== Earthquake ==
The earthquake measured 7.5 on the Richter scale (revised by USGS to 7.3) and caused an 80-million ton landslide, which formed a landslide dam on the Madison River. The earthquake was the most powerful to hit the state of Montana in recorded history. The landslide traveled down the north flank of Sheep Mountain, at an estimated 100 miles per hour (160 km/h), killing 28 people who were camping along the shores of Hebgen Lake and downstream along the Madison River. Upstream the faulting caused by the earthquake forced the waters of Hebgen Lake to shift violently. A seiche (a wave effect created by wind, atmospheric pressure, or seismic activity on water) crested over Hebgen Dam, causing cracks and erosion.

The earthquake created fault scarps up to twenty feet (6 m) high in the area near Hebgen Lake and the lake bottom itself dropped the same distance. 32,000 acres (50 mi^{2}; 130 km^{2}) of the area near Hebgen Lake subsided more than ten feet (3 m). Several geysers in the northwestern sections in Yellowstone National Park erupted and numerous hot springs became temporarily muddied.

Within the immediate vicinity of the earthquake and resultant landslide, a few dozen cabins and homes were destroyed. Overall damages to buildings and roads were minor with damage costs placed at 11 million dollars in 1959. Aftershocks up to 6.5 on the Richter magnitude scale continued for several months. At the time, the quake was the second largest to occur in the continental US during the 20th century.

== Hebgen Dam and creation of the lake ==
Hebgen Dam, built in 1917, is a concrete core and rock fill faced structure that sustained severe damage but continued to hold. Repairs were completed on the dam spillway in a few weeks. The landslide, which occurred downstream from the dam, blocked almost all the flow of the Madison River which began to fill in the void upstream from the slide. In less than a month, the waters had created what is now known as Quake Lake. The lack of a reliable water outlet for this new lake forced one of the largest mobilizations of the U.S. Army Corps of Engineers ever commenced in the western U.S. Before the new landslide dam could be breached by the quickly rising waters, a spillway was constructed to ensure erosion and potential failure of the natural dam would be minimized.

== Visitors center ==
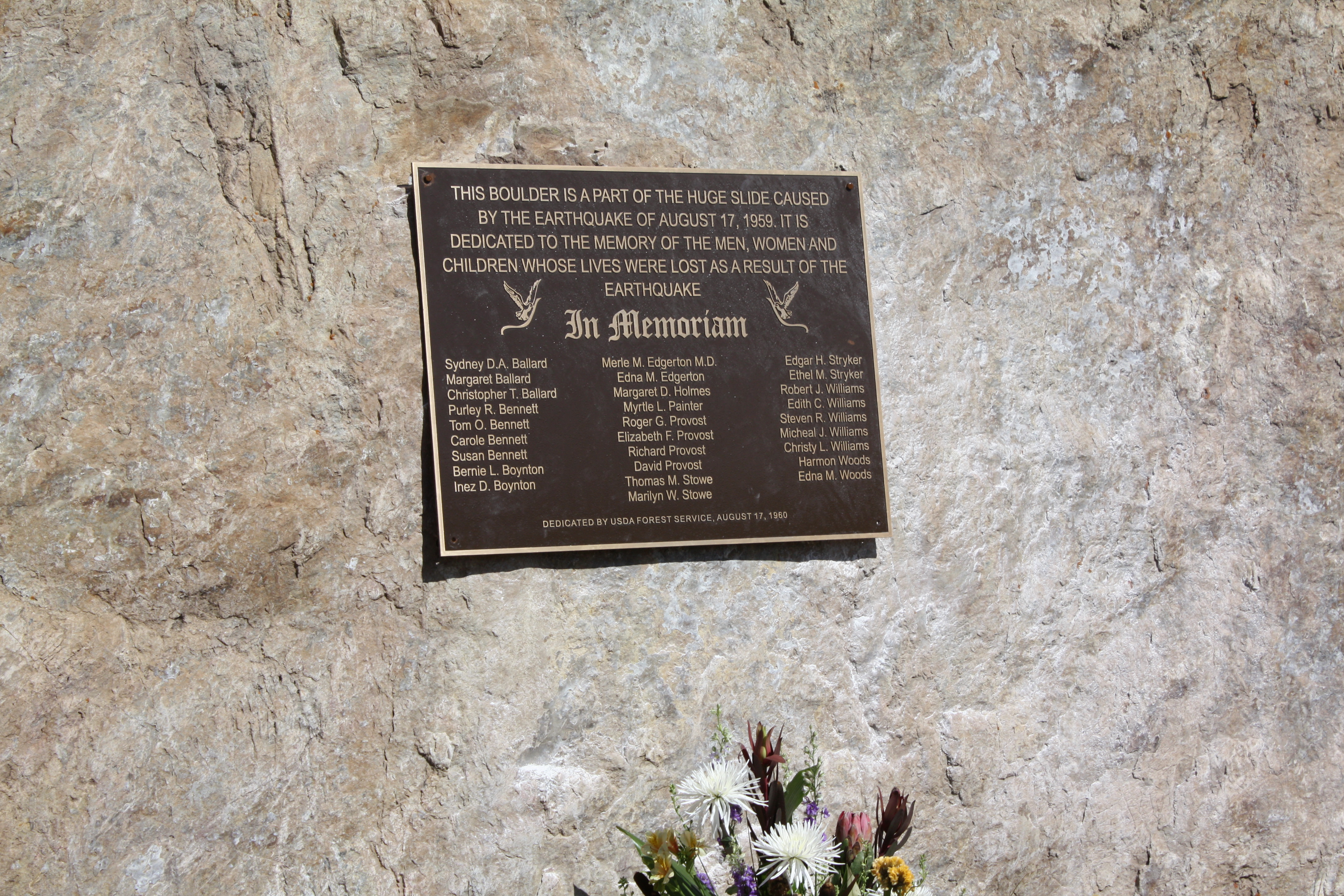
Memorial for the victims from the 1959 earthquake at the Earthquake Lake Visitor Center

In 1967, the U.S. Forest Service's Earthquake Lake Visitor Center opened its doors for the first season of operation. The center provides interpretive services for more than 50,000 visitors annually. The center provides a panoramic view of the mountain that fell and the lake that was formed. This facility hosts interpretive displays on earthquakes, plate tectonics, and a working seismograph. It is located in Custer Gallatin National Forest.
