= Hebgen Lake =

Lake in Gallatin County, Montana

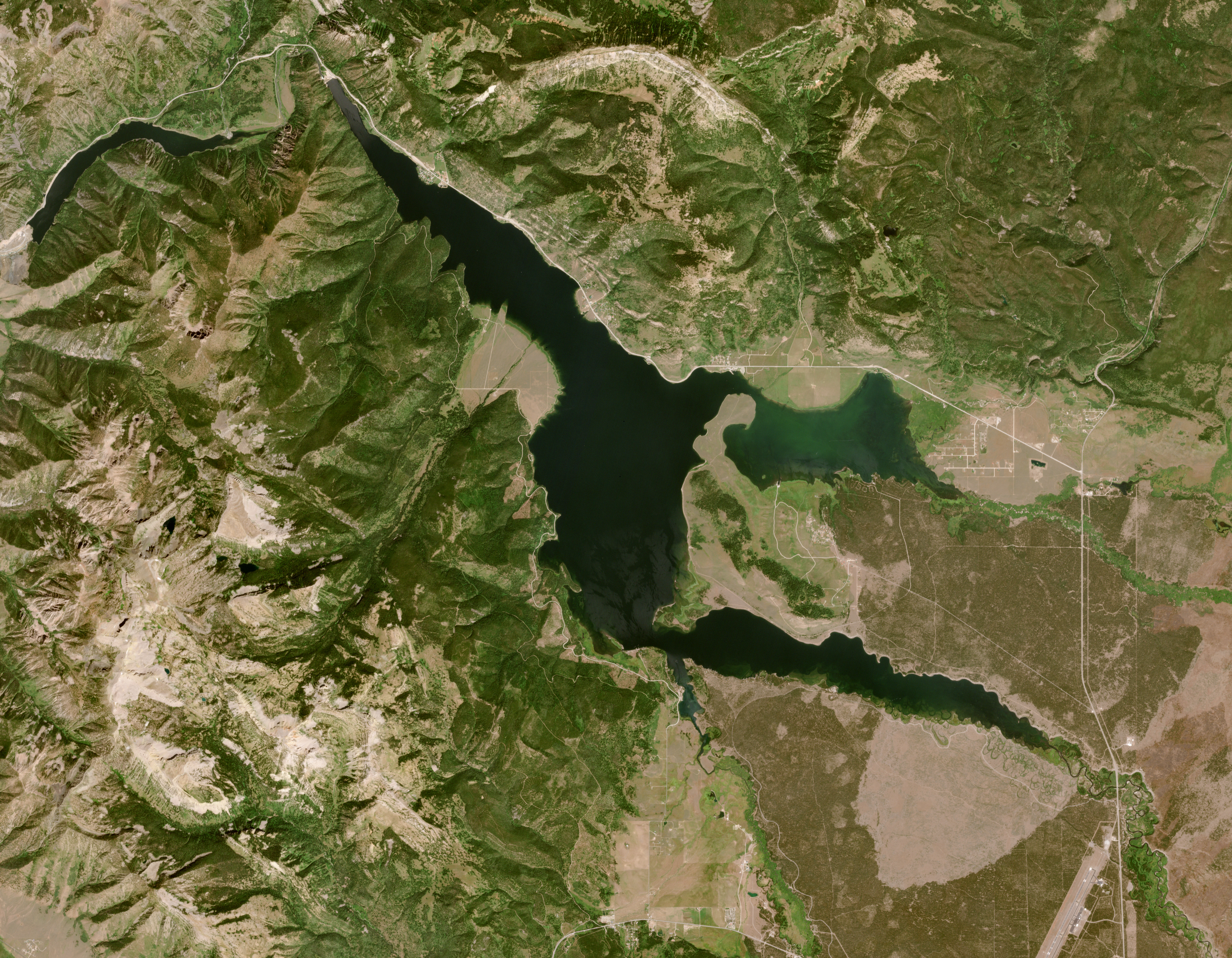
- Hebgen Lake

- Location in Montana
- Location: Gallatin County, Montana, United States
- Coordinates: 44°46′56″N 111°14′01″W
- Type: Reservoir
- Primary inflows: Madison River
- Primary outflows: Madison River
- Catchment area: 905 square miles (2,340 km^{2})
- Basin countries: United States
- Max. length: 15 miles (24 km)
- Max. width: 5 miles (8.0 km)
- Surface area: 12,563 acres (5,084 ha)
- Max. depth: 70 feet (21 m)
- Water volume: 386,200 acre⋅ft (476,400,000 m^{3})
- Shore length^{1}: 65 miles (105 km)
- Surface elevation: 6,539 ft (1,993 m)
- ^{1} Shore length is not a well-defined measure.

Hebgen Lake is a reservoir created by the Hebgen Dam, located in Gallatin County in southwest Montana. It is well known for the 1959 Hebgen Lake earthquake (magnitude 7.1 to 7.5) which occurred nearby on August 17, 1959, forming Quake Lake, which is located immediately downstream.

== Geography ==
Hebgen Lake is located in southwest Montana. It lies approximately 11 miles (18 km) northwest of West Yellowstone and 45 miles (72 km) southwest of Ennis. It is approximately 15 miles (24 km) long and 5 miles (8.0 km) wide, covering 12,563 acres (5,084 ha). At its deepest it is 70 feet (21 m), with a volume of 386,200 acre-feet (0.4764 km^{3}).

In addition to the Madison River, which flows through the reservoir, the tributaries include the South Fork Madison River, which feeds the southeastern Madison Arm, as well as Duck Creek, Grayling Creek and Red Canyon Creek, which flow into the eastern Grayling Arm. To the west, opposite the Grayling Arm, Watkins Creek flows into the main part of the reservoir.

== Ecology ==
Hebgen Lake supports a diverse aquatic ecosystem and is notable for its self-sustaining fish populations and unique ecological challenges. The lake is home to wild rainbow and brown trout, with studies showing that over 80% of rainbow trout are of wild origin. Hatchery contributions are limited, helping to maintain a balanced and resilient fish community.

The Madison and Grayling arms of the lake host extensive beds of aquatic vegetation, including curly-leaf pondweed and Eurasian watermilfoil. These submerged plants provide habitat for aquatic invertebrates and juvenile fish. However, the presence of invasive species has raised management concerns.

Harmful algal blooms (HABs), particularly of cyanobacteria such as Anabaena flos-aquae, have occurred periodically in Hebgen Lake. These blooms can produce toxins that are dangerous to wildlife, livestock, pets, and humans. In response, NorthWestern Energy developed a toxic algae monitoring and public notification plan to reduce health risks and improve lake safety.

Groundwater inputs and nutrient pollution are also ecological concerns. Advocacy groups have questioned the adequacy of environmental review for wastewater discharge permits in the area, citing potential risks to Hebgen Lake's water quality.

Historical water quality assessments conducted by the Environmental Protection Agency in the 1970s provide baseline data on nutrient levels and other limnological parameters, used to establish long-term ecological trends.

=== Fish Species ===
Hebgen Lake supports a coldwater fishery dominated by trout species. Both native and introduced species are found in the lake. They benefit from its cool temperatures, and aquatic vegetation. Notably, wild rainbow and brown trout sustain popular recreational fisheries, while native species like mountain whitefish and westslope cutthroat trout contribute to ecological balance. The table below lists fish species documented in Hebgen Lake by Montana Fish, Wildlife & Parks.

Fish species found in Hebgen Lake
Common name	Scientific name	Group	Water Type	Origin
Brown Trout	Salmo trutta	Trout	Coldwater	Introduced
Mountain Whitefish	Prosopium williamsoni	Trout	Coldwater	Native
Rainbow Trout	Oncorhynchus mykiss	Trout	Coldwater	Introduced
Utah Chub	Gila atraria	Minnow	—	Introduced
Westslope Cutthroat Trout	Oncorhynchus lewisi	Trout	Coldwater	Native

== Recreation ==
Hebgen Lake and the surrounding area offer many recreational activities: camping, fishing, boating, and hiking. Campgrounds include Rainbow Point and Cherry Creek. Rainbow Point is the largest campground on the lake, offering four "loops." Each loop contains approximately 20 campsites. Each campsite can accommodate a full-size camper and one or two vehicles.

== See also ==
- Firehole Ranch
- Quake Lake
- Yellowstone Caldera

== Images ==
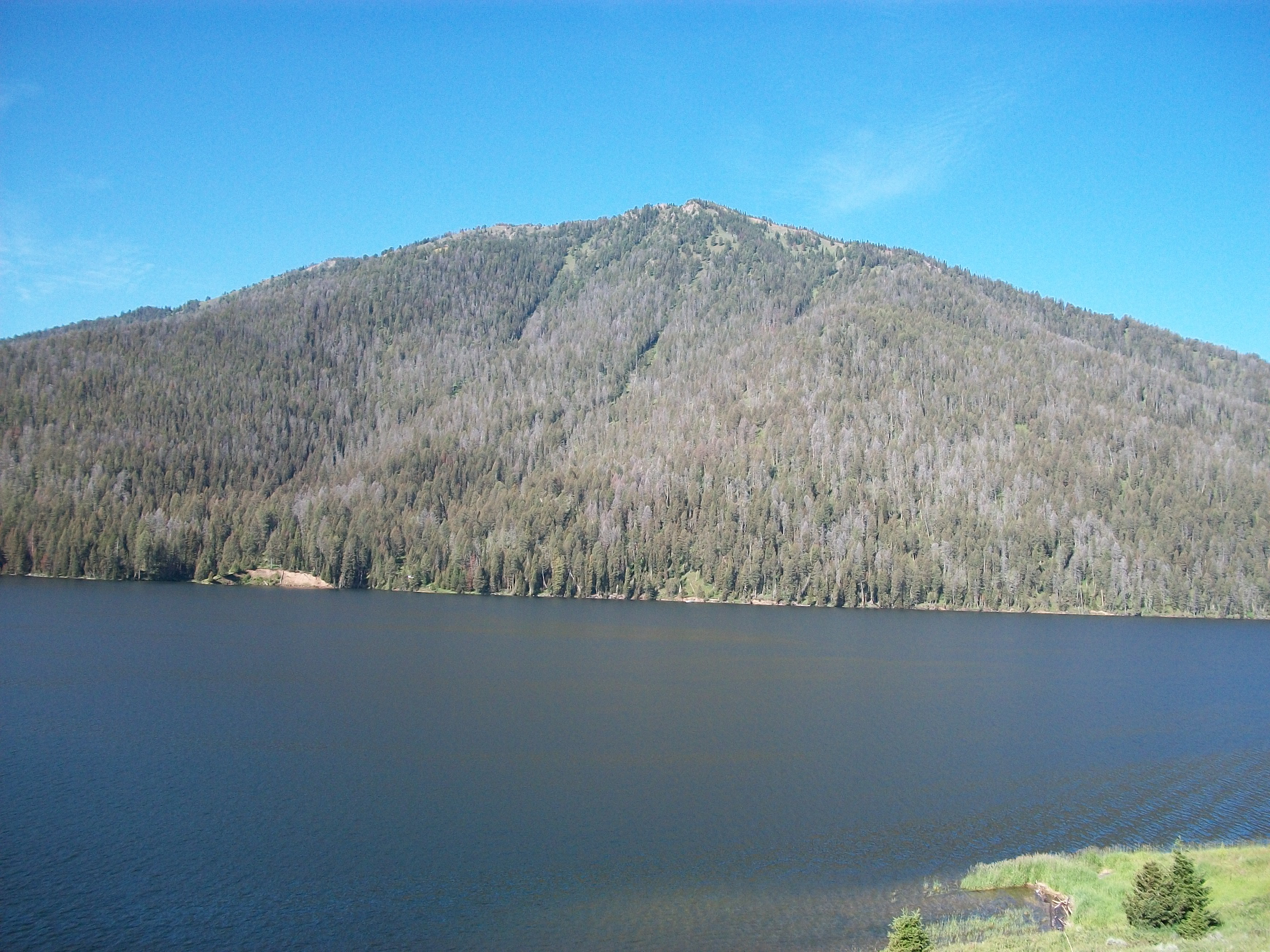
Hebgen Lake, Montana with a mountain as a backdrop

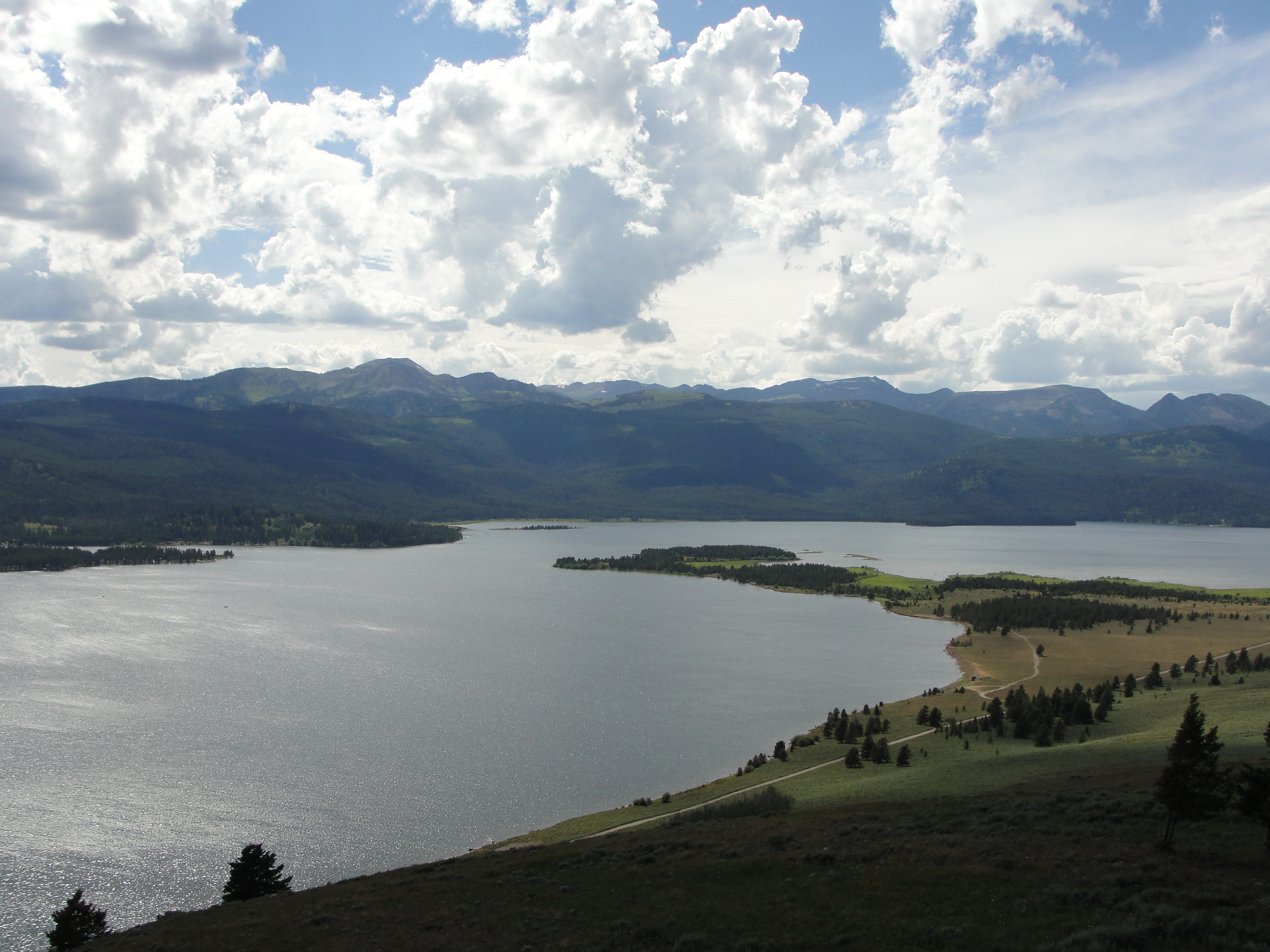
Madison Arm, looking towards Cherry Creek Campground

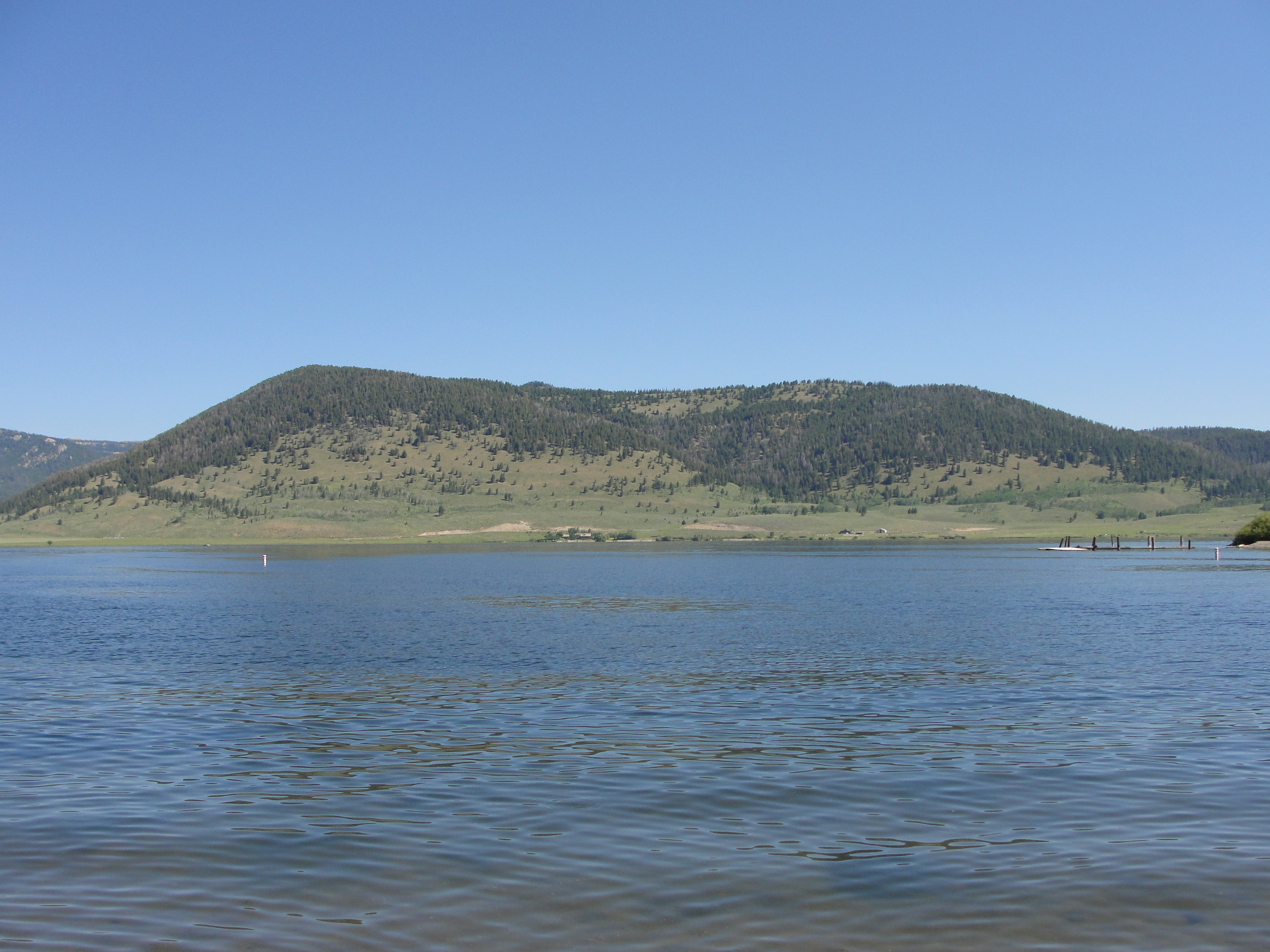
Hebgen Lake, looking North from Rainbow Point Campground

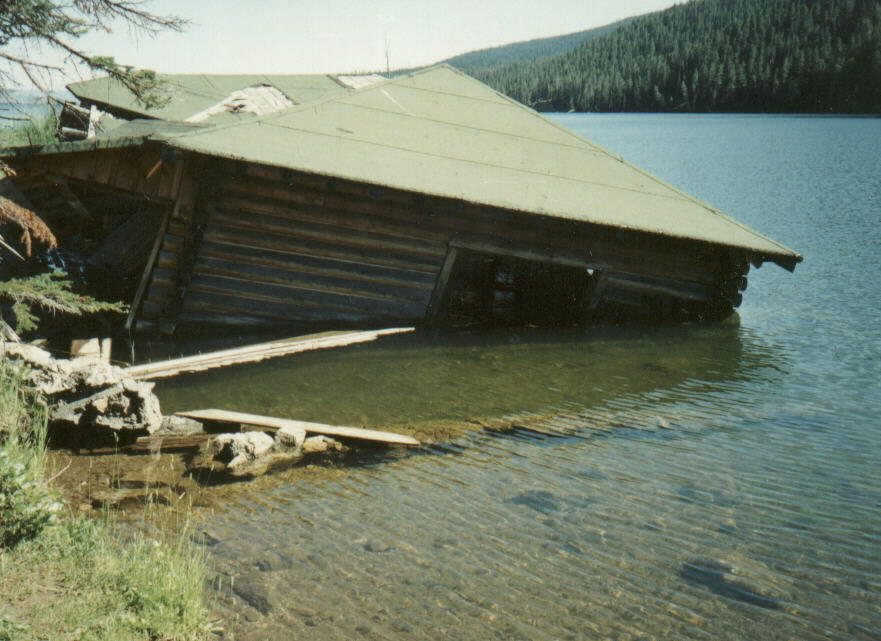
Cabin partially submerged by 1959 earthquake
