= Lake Sherburne Dam =

- Location within Montana
- Country: United States
- Location: Glacier County, near Glacier National Park, Montana
- Coordinates: 48°49′42″N 113°31′17″W
- Construction began: 1914
- Opening date: 1921
- Owner: U.S. Bureau of Reclamation

Dam and spillways
- Type of dam: Earth embankment
- Impounds: Swiftcurrent Creek
- Height: 116.5 ft (35.5 m)
- Length: 1,224 ft (373 m)
- Width (crest): 24 ft (7.3 m)
- Width (base): 460 ft (140 m)
- Dam volume: 242,000 yd^{3} (185,000 m^{3})
- Spillways: One morning glory type, uncontrolled
- Spillway capacity: 2,100 cu ft/s (59 m^{3}/s)

Reservoir
- Creates: Lake Sherburne
- Total capacity: 64,793 acre⋅ft (79,921,000 m^{3})

Power Station
- Hydraulic head: 99 ft (30 m)

Lake Sherburne Dam is a 107-foot (33 m) high compacted earthfill dam built between 1914 and 1921, just outside the boundary of Glacier National Park, Montana, its reservoir extending into the park. The dam impounds Swiftcurrent Creek as it flows out of the park. Water stored in Lake Sherburne is released to flow down Swiftcurrent Creek to the St. Mary River, from which it is diverted to the Milk River, flowing through Canada for 216 mi (348 km) before returning to the United States. Use of these waters is governed by the Boundary Waters Treaty of 1909. Water from the Milk River is used for irrigation in north central Montana.

== Construction ==
The principal storage facility for the Milk River Project was initially intended to be a dam on the St. Mary Lakes (Upper St. Mary Lake in Glacier National Park and Lower St. Mary Lake just east of the park), but no suitable damsite could be found. The Sherburne Lakes in Swiftcurrent Valley were selected as an alternate site, with work beginning in 1914. Building material was borrowed from the upper end of the Sherburne Lakes. In order to expedite transportation of materials, a small tug boat and several barges were purchased for $1900 and hauled overland from Seattle to the project site. Work continued through 1915 and 1916. Swiftcurrent Creek was diverted through the dam's outlet works in April 1916. Work was hampered by delays from spring flooding. The outlet tower and gatehouse were built in 1917, together with the spillway. In October observations indicated that the spillway was being displaced by a slide originating in a hill to the north of the spillway. Drainage of lakes above the slide did not cure the problem. Work on the dam and its control works continued through 1918, but the spillway problems continued. Water storage began in 1919. Eventually the spillway walls and floor were built of wood timbers to allow for movement. Work was complete in 1921. As originally built, Lake Sherburne impounded 66,100 acre-feet (81,500,000 m^{3}) behind the 94-foot (29 m) dam.

In 1960 the original spillway at the north end of the dam was filled in, victim of continuing slide activity, and a new spillway was built, using a circular overflow of the "morning glory" type out in the lake, discharging into the lower portion of the outlet works. The dam's crest was raised 20 ft (6.1 m) to prevent overtopping during the projected maximum flood condition. A wall, 24 ft (7.3 m) high, was built on top of the dam using interlocking concrete units set 24 ft (7.3 m) apart, with the space between filled with compacted earth, the first example of this technique to be used by the Bureau of Reclamation. The outlet works and spillway were raised at this time.

== Operation ==
No minimum water release agreement applies to discharges from Lake Sherburne, with no effective flow in the creek from November through February.

== See also ==
- Glacier View Dam, a much larger dam proposed in the 1940s on the west side of Glacier National Park
