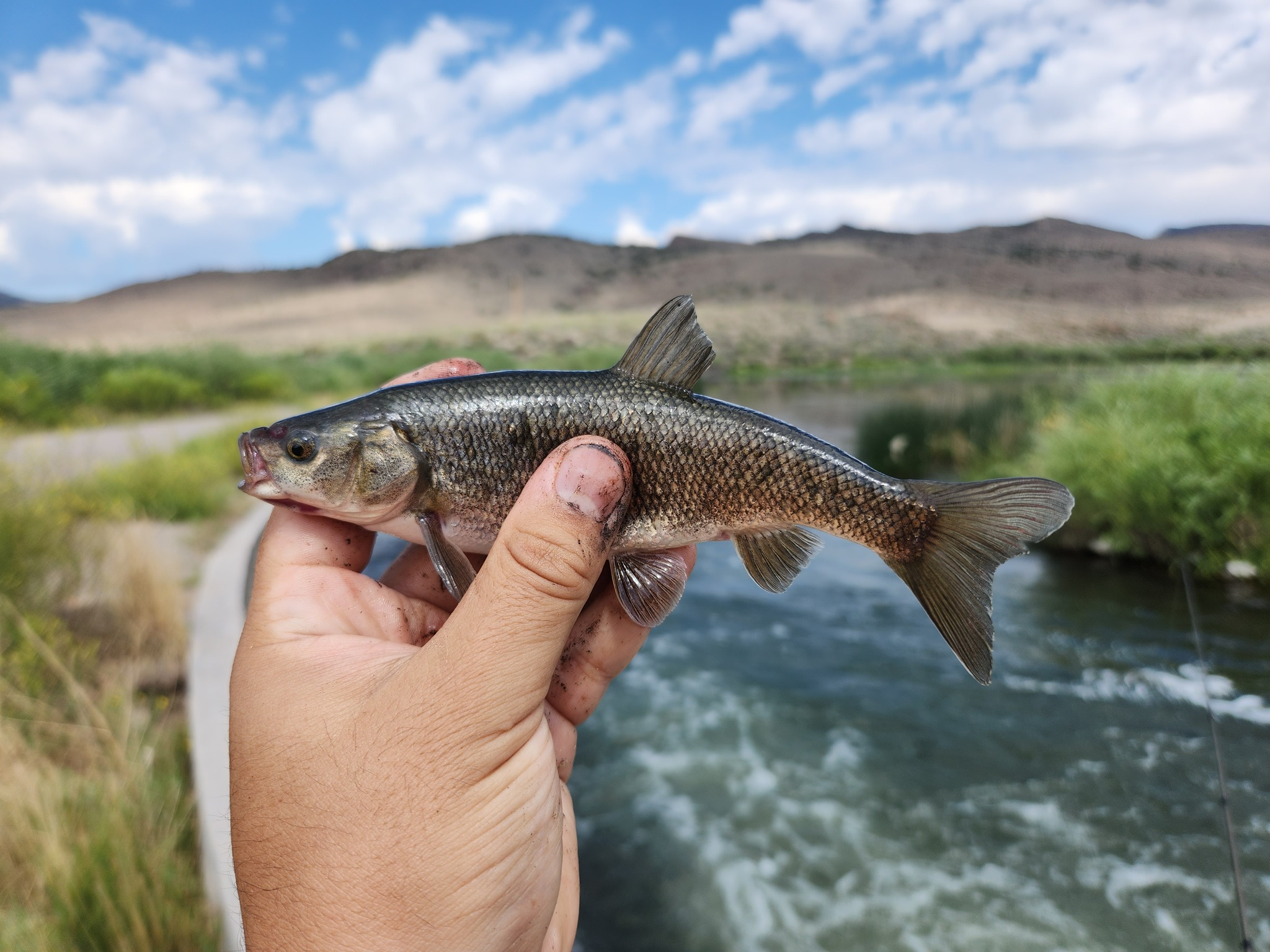

Conservation status
- Least Concern (IUCN 3.1)

Scientific classification
- Kingdom: Animalia
- Phylum: Chordata
- Class: Actinopterygii
- Division: Teleostei
- Order: Cypriniformes
- Family: Leuciscidae
- Genus: Gila
- Species: G. atraria

Binomial name
- Gila atraria (Girard, 1856)

= Utah chub =

Species of fish

The Utah chub (Gila atraria) is a freshwater fish of the family Leuciscidae native to the western United States, where it is abundant in the upper Snake River basin and the Bonneville basin. The species name atraria references the Latin word ater, which means black. The name is likely a reference to the dark coloration of the fins and body.

== Description ==
The dorsal fin of the Utah chub contains nine rays and is located directly over the pelvic fins. Coloration of this species is variable; the dorsal side is generally olive-green ranging to nearly black, and sometimes with a bluish shade, while the sides are silvery, brassy, or golden. Males have somewhat more of a golden look, especially during spawning season, often including a narrow golden stripe along the upper side. Fin colors include olive-green, yellow, and golden shades. A maximum total length of 56 cm (22 in) and weight of 1,360 g (48 oz) was reported from Bear Lake, but sizes of 15–20 cm (5.9–7.9 in) are more typical in many locations. Age estimates on pectoral rays and otoliths suggest that Utah chub can live over 10 years. In most populations, a majority of Utah chub are under seven years old.

== Distribution and habitat ==
The native range of Utah chub includes the Snake River basin in Idaho and Wyoming and the Bonneville basin in Utah and Idaho. The Utah chub has been introduced elsewhere, including various reservoirs in the Colorado River basin of Utah and Wyoming and to the upper Missouri River basin of Montana. Most Utah chub introductions are thought to be the product of angler bait bucket release.

Utah chub can be found in a variety of habitats, from irrigation ditches to large rivers and lakes. Within these systems, they prefer areas with dense vegetation. This species is also tolerant to extreme environmental conditions such as high alkalinity.

== Diet ==
Utah chub are omnivorous with highly plastic diets, consuming plants, algae, and a variety of aquatic invertebrates such as dipterans, chironomids, zooplankton, and crustaceans. When abundant, zooplankton such as Daphnia comprise a majority of diet.

== Reproduction ==
Broadcast spawning occurs in shallow water during late spring and summer, when water temperatures are around 10–15 °C (50–59 °F). Peak spawning activity occurs around 16 °C (61 °F). During the spawn, 2–6 male fish escort each female, and externally fertilize deposited eggs on the lake or river bottom. The eggs hatch in about one week, with hatch time depending on water temperature.

== Management ==
Although easily captured while fishing, most anglers do not consider Utah chub a desirable catch and may find it a nuisance while targeting gamefish. However, Utah chub are occasionally used as bait to catch other piscivorous gamefish. Their usage as live bait has resulted in numerous illegal introductions outside their native range, and has caused states such as Utah and Wyoming to outlaw the use of live Utah chub as bait.

Populations of Utah chub, both native and introduced, are generally viewed as nuisance due to competition with stocked gamefish such as rainbow trout (Oncorhynchus mykiss). Additionally, introduction of Utah chub may pose a threat to native fish through competition or introduction of disease. However, in contrast to observed effects on rainbow trout populations, competitive interactions between an invasive population of Utah chub and Yellowstone cutthroat trout (Oncorhynchus clarkii bouvieri) were not identified in Henrys Lake, Idaho.

State wildlife agencies such as the Utah Division of Wildlife Resources have used reclamation projects on various lakes and reservoirs to eliminate or greatly reduce populations of Utah chub. A majority of reclamation projects are completed using the piscicide rotenone. Although these projects can be successful, they are expensive and may not be a viable long-term management solution, as Utah chub populations may persist or be illegally reintroduced after treatment. Additionally, rotenone reclamation projects are often unpopular with the public, which may limit their appeal as a repeated management tool. Some efforts to reduce Utah chub population size have included top-down control by stocking predatory fish such as walleye (Sander vitreus), tiger muskellunge (Esox masquinongy × lucius), and cutthroat trout (Oncorhynchus clarkii). These methods have also proven effective at controlling Utah chub, in some cases extirpating populations; however, this strategy may result in the establishment of predatory fish outside their native range.
