= 1935 Helena earthquake =

Magnitude 6.2 earthquake in Montana, US, on October 18, 1935

- UTC time: 1935-10-19 04:48:02
- ISC event: 904601
- USGS-ANSS: ComCat
- Local date: October 18, 1935
- Local time: 22:48
- Magnitude: 6.2 M_{s}
- Epicenter: 46.6°N 112.0°W
- Type: Strike-slip
- Areas affected: Montana, United States
- Max. intensity: MMI VIII (Severe)
- Aftershocks: 6.0 M_{s} Oct 31 at 18:37
- Casualties: 4 (2 from the mainshock and 2 from the aftershock of October 31)

The 1935 Helena earthquake occurred at 22:48:02 MDT on October 18 in Montana, with an epicenter near Helena. It had a magnitude of 6.2 on the surface-wave magnitude scale and a maximum perceived intensity of VIII (Severe) on the Mercalli intensity scale. The temblor on that date was the largest of a series of earthquakes that also included a large aftershock on October 31 of magnitude 6.0 and a maximum intensity of VIII. Two people died in the mainshock and two others died as a result of the October 31 aftershock. Property damage was over $4 million.

== Tectonic setting ==
Helena lies within the northern part of the Intermountain Seismic Belt (ISB). This area of relatively intense seismicity runs roughly north–south from northwestern Arizona, through Utah, Idaho, and Wyoming, before dying out in northwestern Montana. It shows a marked deflection to the northwest near Helena, where it intersects with the Lewis and Clark fault zone, a zone of older WNW-trending faults. The ISB is characterized by normal faulting of late Quaternary age, indicating active extensional tectonics, as recognized throughout the Basin and Range province to the south. The focal mechanism of the two largest earthquakes of the 1935 sequence are consistent with right lateral strike-slip faulting on faults similar in trend to two major mapped NW-SE faults, the Bald Butte and Helena Valley Faults.

== Earthquake sequence ==
The sequence began with a small earthquake on October 3. It was followed by a damaging earthquake on October 12 (magnitude 5.9, intensity VII), the mainshock on October 18 (magnitude 6.2, intensity VIII), the large aftershock on October 31 (magnitude 6.0, intensity VIII) and a further large aftershock on November 28 (magnitude 5.5, intensity VI). There were a total of 1800 temblors recorded between October 4, 1935, and April 30, 1936.

== Damage ==
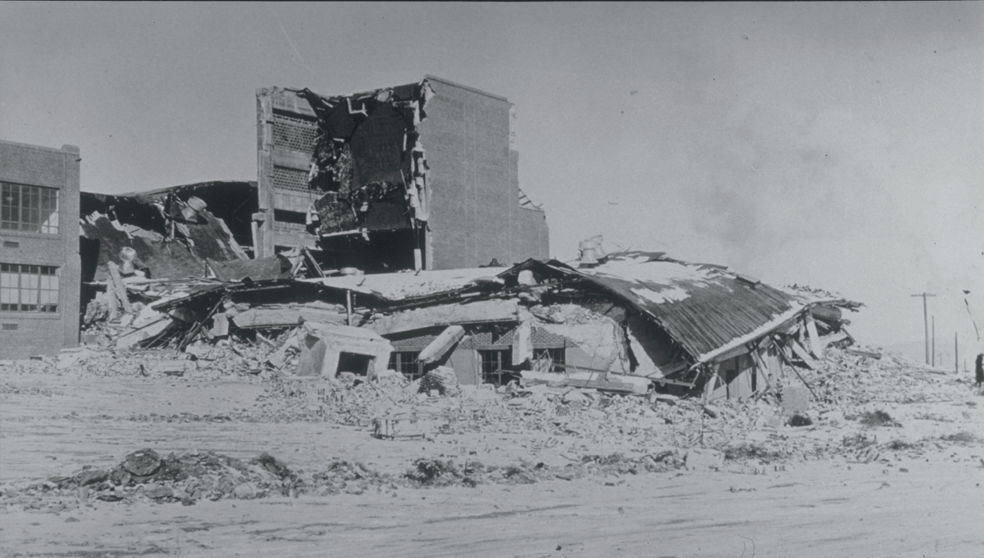
The west wing of the Helena High School after its collapse during the October 31 aftershock following damage during the October 18 mainshock

There was widespread damage to unreinforced masonry structures in the Helena area with more than 200 chimneys being destroyed. The strongest effects were seen in the northeast, where buildings were constructed on alluvial soil, and in the southern business district, which contained many brick buildings. The most extensively damaged building was the Helena High School, which was completed in August 1935 and had just been dedicated in early October. The school buildings, which had cost $500,000, had not been designed to be earthquake resistant. Another building that was totally destroyed and had to be rebuilt was the Lewis and Clark County Hospital. The October 18 earthquake caused an estimated $3 million of damage to property.

The aftershock of October 31 caused an estimated $1 million of further property damage, particularly to structures already weakened by the October 18 shock.

Two people were killed by falling bricks in Helena during the October 18 shock. Two brick masons died as a result of the October 31 aftershock, while removing a brick tower.

== Aftermath ==
A temporary camp was set up by the Red Cross and Federal Emergency Relief Administration on land at the Montana Army National Guard's Camp Cooney. The first night, 400 people stayed there, but most had found space with friends or family outside of the damaged area by the end of the week. Many other people lived in tents around the town for the next few weeks, either due to damaged property or for fear of aftershocks. The National Guard were deployed in Helena to keep sightseers away from the damaged buildings; there was no looting.

== Modern-day concerns ==
A computer simulation performed for the Lewis and Clark County office of Disaster and Emergency Services estimated that a 6.3 magnitude earthquake today would result in property damage over $500 million. Another concern for future earthquakes in the area is soil liquefaction, especially in the area north of the city where there are alluvial soils and a high water table.

== See also ==
- List of earthquakes in 1935
- List of earthquakes in Montana
- List of earthquakes in the United States
