= Montana Power Company =

Former utility company

- Type: Public (NYSE: MTP later TAA)
- Industry: Electric utility
- Founded: 1912; 114 years ago
- Founder: John Ryan
- Defunct: 2003; 23 years ago
- Fate: Bankrupt
- Headquarters: Butte, Montana, U.S.
- Area served: Montana

The Montana Power Company (MPC) was an electric utility company based in Butte, Montana, which provided electricity to Montana consumers and industry from 1912 to 1997.

== History ==
The Montana Power Company was founded in 1912 by John D. Ryan, then president of Anaconda Copper Mining Company, as a consolidation of several hydroelectric plants in Montana.

In the 1960s there was a split, culminating in Anaconda Co. resisting an MPC rate hike. In 1959 MPC bought coal mining rights at Colstrip, Montana, with plans to develop coal-fired electrical generation plants there.

After developing four plants, MPC sold its Colstrip power plants in the fall of 1997 to PP&L Resources for $759 million. The remaining power operations were sold to Northwestern Energy.

With the arrival of utilities deregulation in the 1990s, Montana Power restructured itself into a telecommunications company by 2001, Touch America Holdings, and began divesting its utility and energy holdings. The company built a 21,000-mile (34,000 km) fiber optics network and incurred heavy losses during the dot-com downturn in the early 2000s. Touch America filed for Chapter 11 bankruptcy protection in 2003, selling its facilities to 360networks with plans to sell off remaining assets to defend against shareholder lawsuits. Litigation over the company's assets continued until early 2013, when a settlement was reached offering shareholders 29 cents per share. The shares were once worth $65.

== See also ==
- SKQ Dam
