= NorthWestern Energy =

American utility company

NorthWestern Energy Group, Inc.
- Trade name: NorthWestern Energy
- Type: Public
- Traded as: Nasdaq: NWE
- Industry: Utilities
- Founded: November 27, 1923; 102 years ago (as Northwestern Public Service Company)
- Founder: Albert Emanuel
- Headquarters: Sioux Falls, South Dakota, U.S.
- Area served: Eastern South Dakota; Western Montana
- Key people: E. Linn Draper Jr. (chairman); Robert C. Rowe (president and CEO)
- Products: utility operations consist of regulated electric and natural gas distribution, transmission and energy supply. In addition, they are pursuing electric transmission and generation opportunities.
- Services: Conventional electricity; Natural gas
- Number of employees: 1,600
- Website: northwesternenergy.com

NorthWestern Energy Group, Inc. is a utility company that serves South Dakota, Nebraska, and Montana that is based in Sioux Falls, South Dakota. As of 2019, the company serves approximately 718,000 customers. The company's corporate headquarters are located in Sioux Falls while the headquarters for the South Dakota operations (and which was the headquarters for the old NorthWestern Public Service Company) are in Huron, South Dakota.

== History ==
The Montana operations (formerly known as the Montana Power Company) were acquired around 2000 after that state passed legislation allowing the electric utility industry to be 'unbundled'. Out of state investors (led by PP&L Resources) then immediately acquired the generation assets of Montana Power, leaving that part of the territory vulnerable to high "spot" prices on the energy market (creating some chronic discontent that led the Montana Public Service Commission to submit the one "no" vote that effectively nullified a potential sale of NorthWestern to Babcock & Brown of Australia). In 2014, NorthWestern purchased the dams that were originally part of Montana Power for $900 Million from PPL Corporation.

In August 2025, NorthWestern and Black Hills Corporation agreed to a merger in an all-stock deal valuing the combined entity at $15.4 billion. Once completed, NorthWestern shareholders will own about 46% of the combined company and will be run by NorthWestern's CEO, Brian Bird.

== Controversies ==
In March, 2003, a class action was filed against Northwestern Corp, claiming that defendants artificially inflated the stock price through material omissions and materially false and misleading statements. A $41 million settlement fund was established in 2005.

In March 2009, NorthWestern Energy was involved with a gas explosion in Bozeman, Montana. The explosion destroyed several businesses and killed one person. By November, the company was sued by numerous owners of the destroyed businesses.
