= Vivian Ayers Allen =

American author and poet (1923–2025)

- Born: Vivian Elizabeth Ayers; July 29, 1923; Chester, South Carolina, U.S.
- Died: August 18, 2025 (aged 102); California, U.S.
- Education: Brainerd Institute; Barber-Scotia College; Bennett College
- Occupation: Poet; playwright; cultural activist; museum curator; classicist
- Spouse: Andrew Arthur Allen Sr. (div. 1954)
- Children: 3, including Debbie and Phylicia
- Relatives: Condola Rashad (granddaughter); DeVaughn Nixon (grandson); Vivian Nixon (granddaughter)

Vivian Elizabeth Ayers Allen (July 29, 1923 – August 18, 2025) was an American poet, playwright, cultural activist, museum curator and classicist.

== Background ==
Born in 1923 in Chester, South Carolina, she was African-American and had indigenous heritage. Her grandfather was Cherokee.

She was educated at the historic Brainerd Institute in Chester, where her parents and her grandparents had also been educated, growing up in a house across the street from the school. Her sister Sarah Mildred Ayers Smith was valedictorian of the class of 1937, while Allen graduated in 1939 as a member of the final graduating class from the institution. During her time at Brainerd, she studied Latin and French and learned to play concert piano.

She then studied at Barber-Scotia College and Bennett College. She received Honorary Doctorate degrees from Wilberforce University, in 1995, and her alma mater Bennett College, in 2006.

She married dentist Andrew Arthur Allen Sr. in New York City and they had three children: jazz trumpeter Andrew Arthur "Tex" Allen Jr.; actress and dancer Debbie Allen; and actress Phylicia Rashad. The couple divorced in 1954 after nine years of marriage, Vivian declaring in her divorce suit that they were "manifestly incompatible". She was known as "Ma Turk" by her family, and her daughter Debbie named her own daughter Vivian Nixon after Allen.

Allen attended high-profile Hollywood events with her daughters, including the unveiling of Debbie's star on the Hollywood Walk of Fame in 1991 and the 65th Academy Awards in 1993.

== Poetry ==
Allen's poetry was usually written in the form of prose paragraphs with frequent use of dashes and ellipses.

Her book-length poem Hawk (1957) was an allegory of freedom, personal struggle and responsibility set in space during 2052. The poem foreshadowed the first successes in space travel, published just 11 weeks before the launch of Sputnik I (the first artificial satellite sent from Earth into orbit). It earned praise from the National Aeronautics and Space Administration (NASA), who described Allen as "a distinguished woman of Apollo, whose remarkable contributions significantly advanced our understanding of space exploration." Enlarged reproductions of select lines were exhibited at the Lyndon B. Johnson Space Center in Houston, Texas. The poem was formally republished by Clemson University Press in 2023, based on an exemplar of the original self-published version held in the University of Wisconsin–Madison Special Collections.

In 1964, her poetry was included in Langston Hughes’ collection New Negro Poets, USA. In 1971, she began publishing a literary magazine, The Adept Quarterly.

Allen was also a playwright. She wrote "Bow Boly," about an angel who comes to earth for a mission that becomes entangled with humans, and in 1973 she wrote "The Marriage Ceremony," which explored communal or "tribal" involvement in African-American marriage ceremonies.

== Academic ==
Allen also had an academic career, becoming a librarian and the first African-American faculty member at Rice University in Houston, Texas, in 1966.

In 1973, she collaborated with the Harris County Community Association and a group of certified teachers to produce the program “Workshops in Open Fields,” which aimed to educate preschool children in the arts. She also mentored young Black artists, including the filmmaker Carroll Parrott Blue.

== Mexico ==
Allen lived in Texas for over forty years. She moved with her children to Mexico for a year to give them the opportunity to have new experiences away from the "racist" American South. Her children learned to speak Spanish and attended ballet performances by Mexican dancers. Her daughter Debbie danced with the Ballet Nacional de México.

In Mexico, Allen studied Greek literature, the Mayan culture, and Mesoamerican Math-Astronomy.

== New York and ADEPT ==
In 1984, Allen moved to New York, where she founded the ADEPT New American Museum of the Southwest in Mount Vernon. She organized community arts projects for the local Black community, supported underrepresented minority artists, and stressed the contributions of both African-Americans and Indigenous American peoples to the arts.

She became friends with Jimmie Durham and performed with him and Muhammad Ali in a production of Durham's work My Land.

== Later life ==
In 1994, Allen was honored by the National Council of Negro Women for her "progressive thinking" and for the "positive image she projected" for Black women.

Allen's daughter Phylicia purchased the 12-acre property on which the Brainerd Institute once stood in 1999. Allen became the founding director of the Brainerd Institute Heritage, supported by the Chester Historical Society, with the aim of both preserving the history of a school that helped shape her and commemorating the long struggle of Black Americans to provide their children with a good education. Work to restore the structural integrity of Kumler Hall was completed in 2012. Literacy summer programs were launched in 2017, and free dance classes were held in partnership with the Debbie Allen Dance Academy.

In 2007, Allen and her daughters received the Arts Honor from the Jack and Jill of America Foundation. In 2008, Allen was awarded a Medal of Honor by Winthrop University.

Her poem "On Status" was performed in 2006 on HBO's Def Poetry Jam. It was also sampled by Solange Knowles on the song "S McGregor" from her 2019 album When I Get Home.

=== Centenary and death ===
Allen turned 100 in July 2023. A 100th birthday party was held on the grounds of the Brainerd Institute, where her daughter Phylicia read Hawk with musical accompaniment from the Claflin University Choir. Another celebration event was held at the Rhimes Performing Arts Center in Los Angeles, with readings and performances by celebrities including Angela Bassett, Jesse Williams, Alexis Floyd, Cory Henry, and her daughter Debbie Allen, among others. She died on August 18, 2025, in California, at the age of 102.
