= Finley School =

School in South Carolina, US

Finley School, which grew to include Finley High School, was a school for African Americans in Chester, South Carolina. The school was named for Samuel Louis Finley Sr. (March 11, 1880-?) who was principal of Chester's "colored" school. He was a leader of the South Carolina Colored Teachers Association.

In 1937, a fire in the janitor's closet severely damaged the second floor of the building.

In 1951 a book studying its homemaking program was published. That same year, a school bus overturned in a ditch, injuring 25 students. Dovey Johnson Roundtree taught at the school for three years.

The school had auto mechanic, carpentry, and textile worker programs. Teachers at the school lived in the East Chester neighborhood. Principal Finley lived on Loomis Street.

The S. L. Finley Restoration Association is working to preserve the school's legacy.

In a 1993 interview, J. Charles Jones recounted his recollections of growing up in Chester, attending school, and his mother teaching at the school. He recalled Ms. Crosby being controversial for teaching sex ed.

== See also ==
- Brainerd Institute, a private Presbyterian school in Chester for African Americans
