= Phylicia Rashad =

American actress (born 1948)

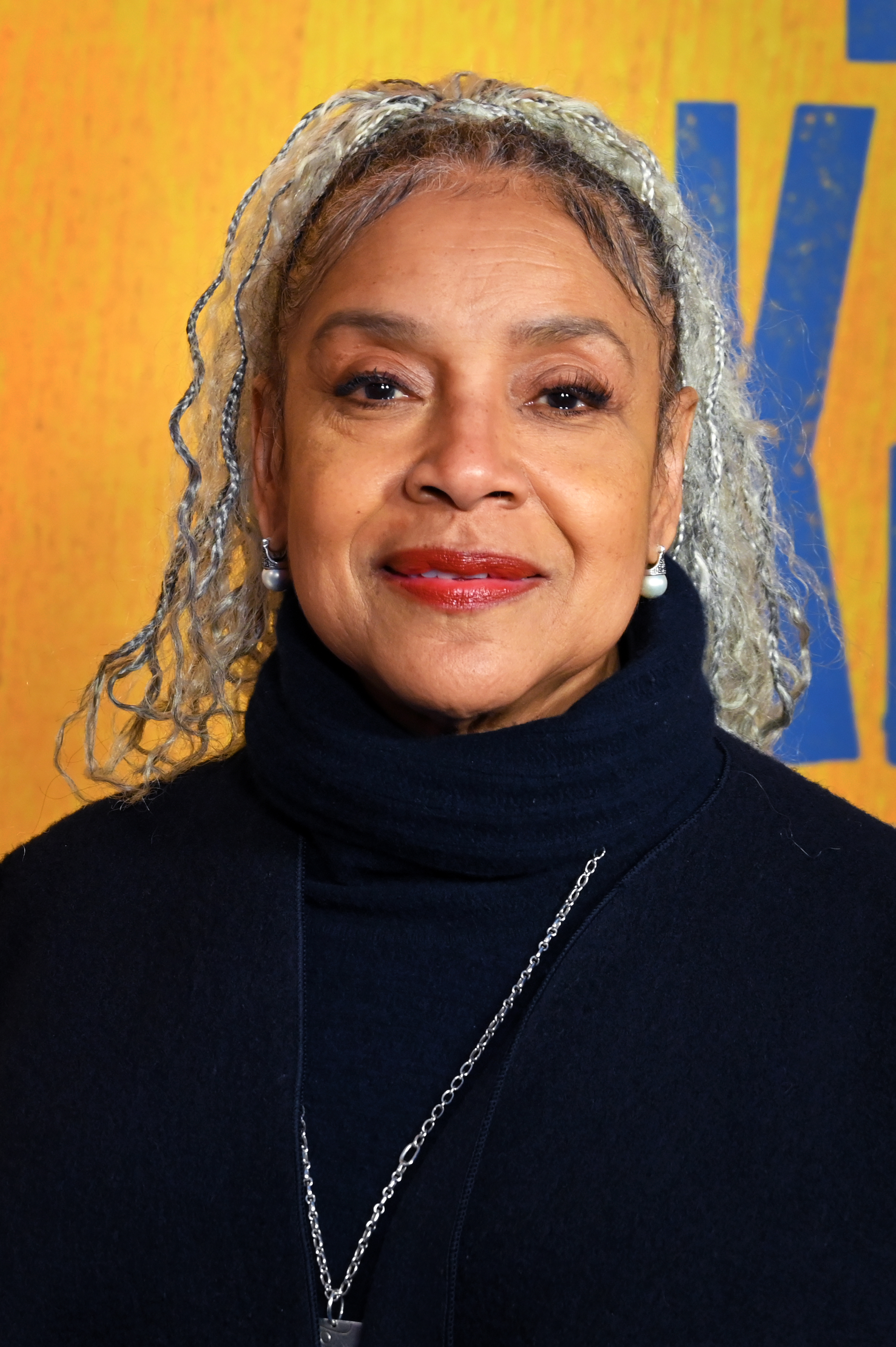
- Rashad in 2025
- Born: Phylicia Ayers-Allen; June 19, 1948 (age 78); Houston, Texas, U.S.
- Education: Howard University (BFA)
- Occupations: Actress; singer
- Years active: 1973–present
- Spouse(s): William Lancelot Bowles Jr. (m. 1972; div. 1975) Victor Willis (m. 1978; div. 1982) Ahmad Rashad (m. 1985; div. 2001)
- Children: 2, including Condola Rashad
- Mother: Vivian Ayers Allen
- Relatives: Debbie Allen (sister); DeVaughn Nixon (nephew); Vivian Nixon (niece)

Phylicia Rashad (/fɪˈlɪʃə rəˈʃɑːd/ fil-ISH-ə rə-SHAHD; née Ayers-Allen; born June 19, 1948) is an American actress. She was most recently dean of the College of Fine Arts at Howard University before her three-year contract ended in May 2024. Known for her roles on stage and screen, she has received two Tony Awards as well as nominations for six Primetime Emmy Awards and a Screen Actors Guild Award.

She is best known for her role as Clair Huxtable on the NBC sitcom The Cosby Show (1984–1992) which earned her two Primetime Emmy Award for Outstanding Lead Actress in a Comedy Series nominations in 1985 and 1986. She also played Ruth Lucas on Cosby (1996–2000), and Brenda Glover in Little Bill (1999–2004). She was also Emmy-nominated for her roles in A Raisin in the Sun (2008) and This Is Us (2019–2021).

On stage, Rashad became the first Black actress to win the Tony Award for Best Actress in a Play, for a revival of A Raisin in the Sun (2004). She won her second Tony Award for Best Featured Actress in a Play for Dominique Morisseau's Skeleton Crew (2022). Her other Broadway credits include Into the Woods (1988), Jelly's Last Jam (1993), Gem of the Ocean (2004), and Cat on a Hot Tin Roof (2008).

She has appeared in various films such as For Colored Girls (2010), Good Deeds (2012), Creed (2015), Creed II (2018), Creed III (2023), and The Beekeeper (2024). She lent her voice to the Disney–Pixar animated film Soul (2020).

In the 21st century, she has directed revivals of three plays by August Wilson, in major theaters in Seattle; Princeton, New Jersey; and Los Angeles. She also directed Purpose in its 2024–2025 run at the Helen Hayes Theater on Broadway.

== Early life and education ==
Phylicia Ayers-Allen was born on June 19, 1948, in Houston, Texas. Her mother, Vivian Ayers Allen, was an artist, poet, playwright, scholar, and publisher. Her father, Andrew Arthur Allen, was an orthodontist. Her siblings are brother Tex (Andrew Arthur Allen Jr.), a jazz musician; sister Debbie Allen, an actress, choreographer, and director; and brother Hugh Allen, now a real estate banker in Charlotte, North Carolina.

Their parents divorced when Phylicia was six. Seven years later, her mother moved with Phylicia and her sister to Mexico City, Mexico, to avoid the racial segregation in the United States. Ayers-Allen later returned to the US to study at Howard University, graduating magna cum laude in 1970 with a Bachelor of Fine Arts degree. While there, she was initiated into the Alpha chapter of Alpha Kappa Alpha sorority.

== Career ==
=== 1971–1983: Early work and Broadway debut ===
Ayers-Allen first became known for her roles on stage, making her Broadway debut in the Melvin Van Peebles musical Ain't Supposed to Die a Natural Death (1971). Throughout the decade she returned to Broadway in a string of productions playing Deena Jones in Dreamgirls (she also was Sheryl Lee Ralph's understudy until leaving the show in 1982, after being passed over as Ralph's full-time replacement). She played a Munchkin in The Wiz for three and a half years. In 1978, she released the album Josephine Superstar, a disco concept album telling the life story of Josephine Baker. The album was mainly written and produced by Jacques Morali and Victor Willis, Rashad's second husband and the original lead singer and lyricist of the Village People. She met Willis while they were both cast in The Wiz.

=== 1982–2003: The Cosby Show and other roles ===
Other Broadway credits include August: Osage County, Cat on a Hot Tin Roof, Gem of the Ocean, Raisin in the Sun (2004 Tony Award for Best Actress in a Play/Drama Desk Award), Blue, Jelly's Last Jam, Into the Woods, and Ain't Supposed to Die a Natural Death. Off-Broadway credits include Lincoln Center's productions of Cymbeline and Bernarda Alba; Helen, The Story and Everybody's Ruby at the Public Theater; The Negro Ensemble Company productions of Puppet Play, Zooman and the Sign, Sons and Fathers of Sons, In an Upstate Motel, Weep Not For Me, and The Great Mac Daddy; Lincoln Center's production of Ed Bullins' The Duplex; and The Sirens at the Manhattan Theatre Club. In regional theatre, she performed as Euripides' Medea and in Blues for an Alabama Sky at the Alliance Theatre in Atlanta, Georgia. Other regional theatres at which she has performed are the Arena Stage in Washington, D.C., and the Huntington Theatre in Boston.

Rashad joined the cast of the ABC soap opera One Life to Live to play publicist Courtney Wright in 1983. She is best known for the role of attorney Clair Huxtable on the NBC sitcom The Cosby Show. The show, which ran from 1984 to 1992, starred Bill Cosby as obstetrician Heathcliff "Cliff" Huxtable, and focused on their life with their five children. For her role, she earned two Primetime Emmy Award nominations in 1985 and 1986. In 1985, Rashad co-hosted the NBC telecast of the Macy's Thanksgiving Day Parade with Pat Sajak and Bert Convy. When Cosby returned to TV comedy in 1996 with CBS's Cosby, he called Rashad to play Ruth Lucas, his character's wife. The pilot episode had been shot with Telma Hopkins, but Cosby fired the executive producer and replaced Hopkins with Rashad. The sitcom ran from 1996 to 2000. That year, Cosby also asked Rashad to work on his animated television series Little Bill, in which the actress voiced Bill's mother, Brenda, until the show's end in 2004.

In 1993, Rashad was the first narrator at Disney's Candlelight Processional when the event was moved to Epcot. Her narration of the nativity story was recorded and released by Walt Disney Records. She also played a role in the pre-show of the Dinosaur ride at Walt Disney World's Animal Kingdom theme park as Dr. Helen Marsh, the head of the Dino Institute.

=== 2004–2018: Theatre roles and acclaim ===
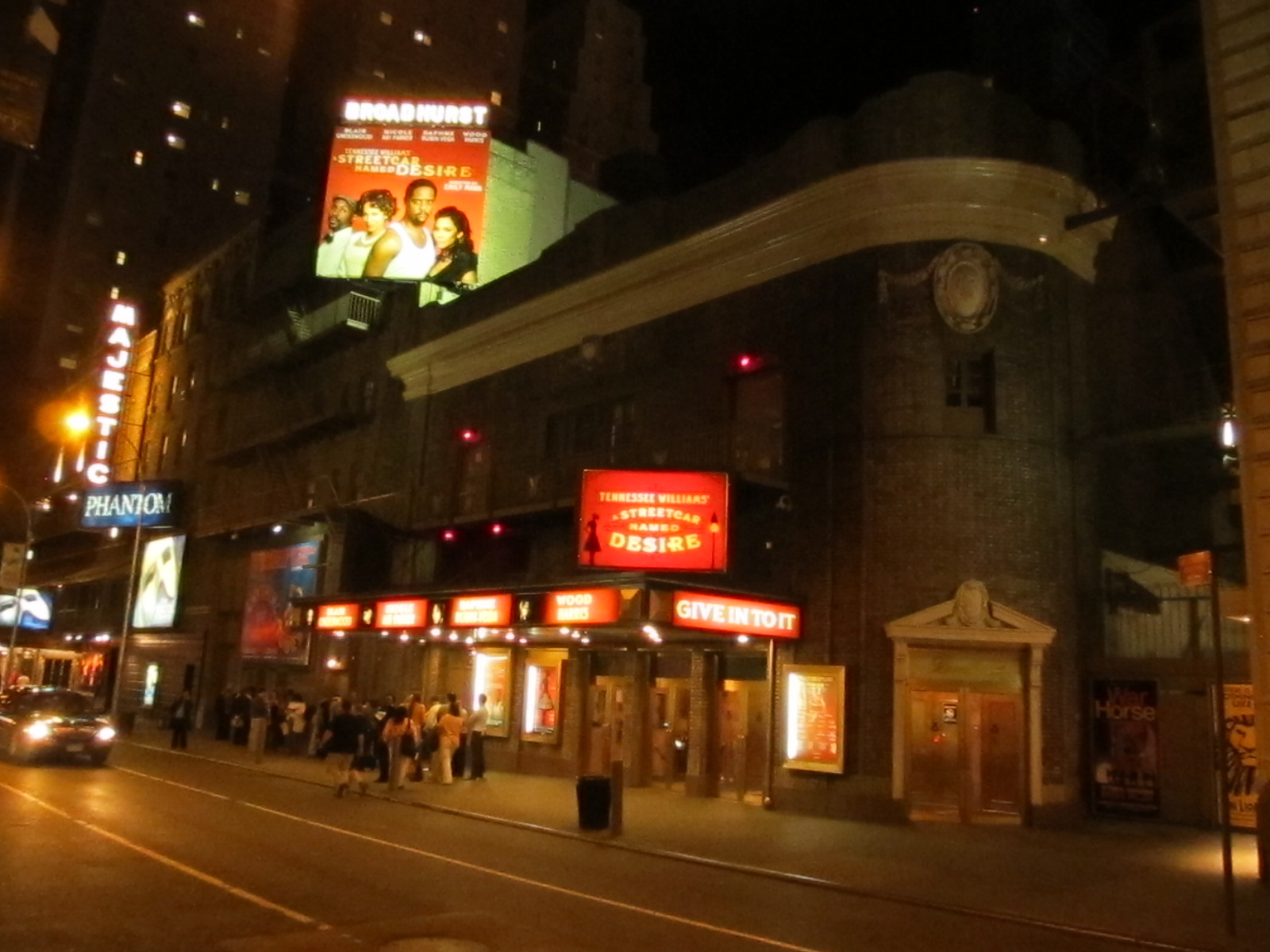
Marquee for the Broadway revival of A Streetcar Named Desire in 2008

In the early 21st century, Rashad was the first black actress of any nationality to win the Best Actress (Play) Tony Award, for her 2004 performance as Lena Younger in a revival of the play A Raisin in the Sun by Lorraine Hansberry. Rashad also won the 2004 Drama Desk Award for Best Actress in a Play for A Raisin in the Sun, tying (split award that year) with Viola Davis for the play Intimate Apparel. Rashad was nominated again for a Tony the following year, for her performance in Gem of the Ocean. In 2007, Rashad made her directorial debut with the Seattle Repertory Theatre's production of August Wilson's Gem of the Ocean. In 2008, Rashad starred on Broadway as Big Mama in an all African-American production of Tennessee Williams's Pulitzer Prize-winning drama Cat on a Hot Tin Roof, directed by her sister Debbie Allen. She appeared alongside stage veterans James Earl Jones (Big Daddy) and Anika Noni Rose (Maggie), as well as film actor Terrence Howard, who made his Broadway debut as Brick.

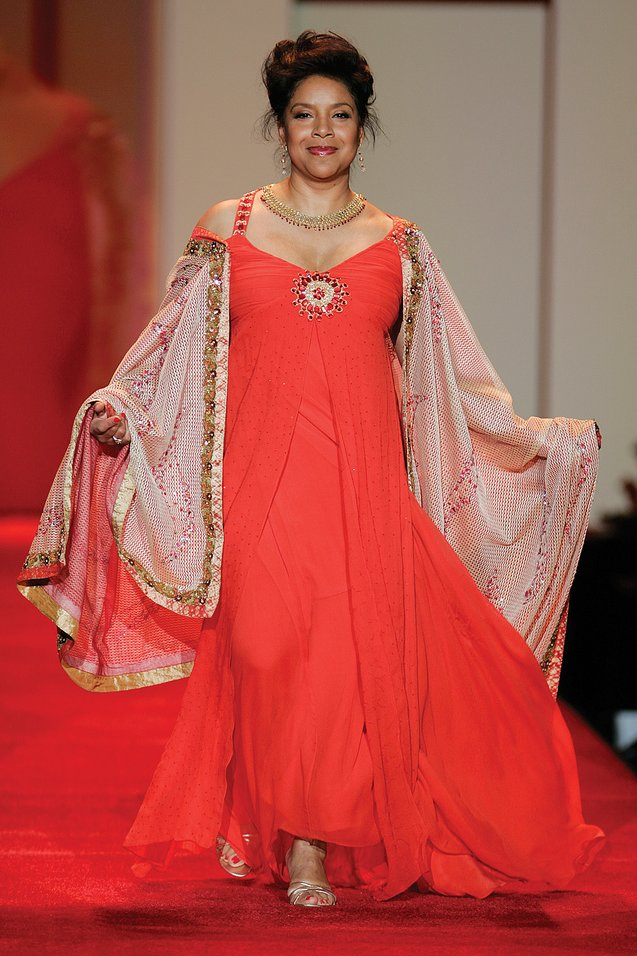
Rashad at the 2007 Red Dress Collection for The Heart Truth Foundation

Rashad played "Kill Moves"' wealthy mother on the Chris Rock created sitcom Everybody Hates Chris on December 9, 2007. In 2007 she appeared as Winnie Guster the mother of main character Burton "Gus" Guster in the Psych episode "Gus's Dad May Have Killed an Old Guy". She returned to the role in 2008, in the episode "Christmas Joy". In February 2008, Rashad portrayed Lena Younger in the television film adaptation of A Raisin in the Sun, directed by Kenny Leon. It starred core members of the cast of the 2004 Broadway revival at the Royale Theatre of Lorraine Hansberry's 1959 play, including Audra McDonald as Ruth Younger, and Sean Combs as Walter Lee Younger. The television film adaption debuted at the 2008 Sundance Film Festival and was broadcast by ABC on February 25, 2008. According to Nielsen Media Research, the program was watched by 12.7 million viewers and ranked No. 9 in the ratings for the week ending March 2, 2008.

In 2009, she appeared as Violet Weston, the drug-addicted matriarch of Tracy Letts's award-winning play August: Osage County, at the Music Box Theatre. Rashad returned to directing August Wilson's work in early 2014, when she led a revival of Wilson's Fences, at the McCarter Theatre in Princeton, New Jersey. It received generally positive reviews. She continued to focus on Wilson's work, including a well-received production of Ma Rainey's Black Bottom, which she directed at the Mark Taper Forum in Los Angeles in late 2016. From March 17 to May 1, 2016, Rashad played the lead role of Shelah in Tarell Alvin McCraney's play Head of Passes at The Public Theater. Her performance was positively reviewed. In November 2010, Rashad featured as Gilda in the ensemble cast in the Tyler Perry film For Colored Girls, based on the play For Colored Girls Who Have Considered Suicide When the Rainbow Is Enuf by Ntozake Shange. Rashad said about this work in an interview with Vibe Movies & TV in 2010: "I saw the original Broadway play. I thought it was amazing how such a story that wasn't pretty was poetry. Usually poetry is about lofty things and this was the poetry of speech and the movement of everyday people. I found a little bit of it off-putting to tell you the truth, because it was so angry when I saw it. And I think Tyler Perry has added an element here that wasn't in the original stage production, and that is the necessity for taking responsibility for one's own self otherwise you are just living to die. That is where he wrote the line [in the film], 'You gotta take some responsibility in this. Otherwise you are just living to die.'"

In 2012, she starred in another Tyler Perry film, Good Deeds. Also in 2012, Rashad played Clairee Belcher in the remake of Steel Magnolias (the role originated by Olympia Dukakis). This version has an all African American A-list cast, including Queen Latifah as M'Lynn, Jill Scott as Truvy, Condola Rashad as Shelby, Adepero Oduye as Annelle, and Alfre Woodard as Ouiser. In 2015, she played Mary Anne Creed in the sports film Creed (2015), and again in the sequels Creed II (2018) and Creed III (2023). In 2016, Rashad was cast as a recurring guest star in the role of Diana DuBois in the third season of the Lee Daniels-produced Empire television series on Fox. In 2017, Rashad portrayed Bishop Yvette A. Flunder, pastor of The City of Refuge Church in San Francisco, Calif., as part of the Dustin Lance Black mini-series When We Rise. Her appearance in the show highlighted the reputed compassion of the church, the commitment of its leadership, and the loving home the church provides to minister in the tough, primarily African-American community in San Francisco.

=== 2019–present ===
From 2019 to 2021 she portrayed Carol Clarke in the NBC drama series This is Us earning three Primetime Emmy Award for Outstanding Guest Actor in a Drama Series nominations. In 2020, Rashad provided the voice of Libba Gardner, Joe Gardner's mother, in the Pixar animated film Soul which earned the Academy Award for Best Animated Feature. That same year she had a supporting role in the family Christmas film Jingle Jangle: A Christmas Journey starring Forest Whitaker and Keegan-Michael Key. The following year she had a cameo role in the Lin-Manuel Miranda directed musical drama Tick, Tick...Boom! (2021). She had recurring roles on the Netflix drama series 13 Reasons Why (2020) and the CBS / Paramount+ legal series The Good Fight (2022). She returned to Broadway in the Dominique Morisseau play Skeleton Crew (2022) for which she earned a Tony Award for Best Featured Actress in a Play. In 2024, she appeared in the action film The Beekeeper.

== Academia and legacy ==
She was dubbed "The Mother of the Black Community" at the 2010 NAACP Image Awards. In May 2021, Rashad was appointed as dean of Howard University's Chadwick A. Boseman College of Fine Arts. In August 2023, Howard University announced Rashad was going to step down from the position of dean at the end of the 2023–24 academic year.

Rashad received an honorary doctorate from Carnegie Mellon University.

== Personal life ==
Rashad is a vegetarian.

=== Marriages and family ===
Rashad's first marriage, in 1972, was to dentist William Lancelot Bowles Jr. They had one son, William Lancelot Bowles III, who was born the following year. The marriage ended in 1975. Rashad married Victor Willis (original lead singer of Village People) in 1978; they had met during the run of The Wiz. They divorced in 1982.

She married a third time, to Ahmad Rashad on December 14, 1985. He was a former NFL wide receiver and sportscaster. It was a third marriage for each of them, and she took his last name. He proposed to her during a pregame show for a nationally televised Thanksgiving Day football game between the New York Jets and the Detroit Lions on November 28, 1985. Their daughter, Condola Phylea Rashad, was born on December 11, 1986, in New York. The couple divorced in early 2001, and she has retained the surname Rashad.

=== Friendship with Bill Cosby ===
Rashad has been friends with Bill Cosby since The Cosby Show started production; Cosby gave her away at her 1985 wedding to Ahmad Rashad. In June 2021, when Cosby's 2018 conviction for sexual assault was overturned, Rashad tweeted "FINALLY!!!! A terrible wrong is being righted- a miscarriage of justice is corrected!" This was widely criticized, and characterized as rape apologism. Some called for Howard University to revoke her appointment, and it stated that "Personal positions of University leadership do not reflect Howard University's policies." Rashad later apologized in an email to Howard University students and their parents writing in part that her comments "were in no way directed towards survivors of sexual assault."

== Acting credits ==
=== Film ===
Year	Title	Role	Notes
1972	The Broad Coalition	-	Credited as Phylicia Ayers-Allen
1983	The Wiz	MunchkinField/Mouse	Video
1995	Once Upon a Time...When We Were Colored	Ma Ponk	
1999	Loving Jezebel	Alice Melville	
2000	The Visit	Dr. Coles	
2001	Little Bill: Big Little Bill	Brenda Glover (voice)	Video
2010	Just Wright	Ella McKnight	
2010	Frankie & Alice	Edna	
2010	For Colored Girls	Gilda	
2012	Good Deeds	Wililemma	
2013	Gods Behaving Badly	Demeter	
2015	Emily & Tim	Emily Hanratty	
2015	Creed	Mary Anne Creed	
2018	Creed II	Mary Anne Creed	
2020	A Fall from Grace	Sarah Miller/Betty Mills	
2020	Black Box	Dr. Lilian Brooks	
2020	Soul	Libba Gardner (voice)	
2020	Jingle Jangle: A Christmas Journey	Grandmother Journey Jangle	
2021	The Disaster Dreams	Brianna's Mom (voice)	Short
2021	Tick, Tick... Boom!	'Sunday' Legend #12	
2023	Creed III	Mary Anne Creed	Final appearance in Creed franchise
2023	Our Son	Maya	
2024	The Beekeeper	Eloise Parker	
2025	Ruth & Boaz	Naomi	

=== Television ===
Year	Title	Role	Notes
1976	Delvecchio	Ventita Ray	Episode: "Wax Job"
1978	Watch Your Mouth	-	Episode: "First Days - Part 1 & 2"
1981	We're Fighting Back	-	TV movie
1984	One Life to Live	Courtney Wright	Regular cast
1984–92	The Cosby Show	Clair Hanks Huxtable	Main cast
1985	Santa Barbara	Felicia Dalton	Regular cast
1985	The Love Boat	Lonette Becker	Episode: "A Day in Port"
1987	Uncle Tom's Cabin	Eliza	TV movie
1988	Mickey's 60th Birthday	Disneyland Cleaning Lady	TV movie
1988–90	A Different World	Clair Huxtable	Guest (season 1–2), recurring cast (season 3)
1989	False Witness	Lynne Jacobi	TV movie
1989	Polly	Aunt Polly	TV movie
1990	Reading Rainbow	Herself	Episode: "Mufaro's Beautiful Daughters"
1990	Teenage Mutant Ninja Turtles	Jane Goodfellow (voice)	Episode: "What's Michelangelo Good For?"
1990	Polly: Comin' Home!	Aunt Polly	TV movie
1991	The Earth Day Special	Clair Huxtable	TV special
1991	Blossom	Blossom's Dream Mom	Episode: "Blossom's Blossom"
1991	Jailbirds	Janice Grant	TV movie
1993	American Playhouse	Mayor Turner	Episode: "Hallelujah"
1994	Ghostwriter	Herself	Episode: "A Crime of Two Cities"
1994	The Cosby Mysteries	Hadley Roebuck	Episode: "Expert Witness"
1994	Touched by an Angel	Elizabeth Jessup	Episode: "Tough Love"
1994	David's Mother	Gladys Johnson	TV movie
1995	The Possession of Michael D	Dr. Marion Hale	TV movie
1995	In the House	Rowena	Episode: "Sister Act"
1996	The Babysitter's Seduction	Detective Kate Jacobs	TV movie
1996–2000	Cosby	Ruth Lucas	Main cast
1998	Free of Eden	Desiree	TV movie
1998–2000	Intimate Portrait	Herself	Recurring guest
1999–2004	Little Bill	Brenda Glover (voice)	Main cast
2000	Happily Ever After: Fairy Tales for Every Child	Lady Fulten (voice)	Episode: "The Princess and the Pauper"
2000	Bull	Mrs. Granville	Episode: "What the Past Will Bring"
2001	Biography	Narrator (voice)	Episode: "Dionne Warwick: Don't Make Me Over"
2001	The Old Settler	Elizabeth	TV movie
2001	Murder, She Wrote: The Last Free Man	Cassandra Hawkins	TV movie
2002	Touched by an Angel	Elizabeth Jessup	Episode: "The Last Chapter"
2007	Everybody Hates Chris	Kathleen Devereaux	Episode: "Everybody Hates Kwanzaa"
2007–14	Psych	Winnie Guster	Guest cast (season 2-3 & 8)
2008	The Life & Times of Tim	The Boss's Wife (voice)	Episode: "Theo Strikes Back/Amy Gets Wasted"
2008	A Raisin in the Sun	Lena Younger	TV movie
2011	Change of Plans	Dorothy	TV movie
2012	Steel Magnolias	Clairee Belcher	TV movie
2012–13	The Cleveland Show	Dee Dee Tubbs (voice)	Guest (season 3), recurring cast (season 4)
2013	Do No Harm	Dr. Vanessa Young	Main cast
2014	Sofia the First	Glacia the Ice Witch (voice)	Episode: "Winter's Gift"
2016–17	Jean-Claude Van Johnson	Jane	Main cast
2016–18	Empire	Diana DuBois	Recurring cast (season 3–5)
2017	When We Rise	Yvette Flunder	Episode: "Night IV: Part VI and VII"
2017	Tour de Pharmacy	Victoria Young	TV movie
2019	The Rocketeer	May Songbird (voice)	Episode: "Songbird Soars Again"
2019–21	This Is Us	Carol Clarke	Guest (season 3–4), recurring cast (season 5)
2019–21	David Makes Man	Dr. Woods-Trap	Main cast (season 1), guest (season 2)
2020	Station 19	Pilar	Episode: "Ice Ice Baby"
2020	13 Reasons Why	Pastor	Recurring cast (season 4)
2021	Grey's Anatomy	Nell Timms	Episode: "Sign O' the Times"
2022	The Good Fight	Renetta Clark	Recurring cast (season 6)
2022	Little America	Margaret Jean the Queen	Episode: "Mr. Song"
2023	The Crossover	Barbara	Episode: "Huddle Up"
2023	Curses!	Georgia Snitker (voice)	Recurring cast
2024	Diarra from Detroit	Vonda	Main cast
2025	The Chi	Renee	Recurring cast
2025	The Gilded Age	Mrs. Elizabeth Kirkland	Recurring cast (season 3)

=== Theater ===
Year	Title	Role	Venue	Ref.
1971	Ain't Supposed to Die a Natural Death	Performer	Ethel Barrymore Theatre, Broadway	
1975	The Wiz	Field Mouse / Munchkin	Majestic Theatre, Broadway	
1981	Dreamgirls	Ensemble	Imperial Theatre, Broadway	
1988	Into the Woods	The Witch (Replacement)	Martin Beck Theatre, Broadway	
1992	Jelly's Last Jam	Anita (Replacement)	Virginia Theatre, Broadway	
2004	A Raisin in the Sun	Lena Younger	Royale Theatre, Broadway	
2004	Gem of the Ocean	Aunt Esther	Walter Kerr Theatre, Broadway	
2005	A Wonderful Life	Miss Bailey	Shubert Theatre, Broadway	
2007	Cymbeline	Queen	Vivian Beaumont Theatre, Broadway	
2008	Cat on a Hot Tin Roof	Big Mama	Broadhurst Theatre, Broadway	
2009	August: Osage County	Violet Weston (Replacement)	Imperial Theatre, Broadway	
2022	Skeleton Crew	Faye	Samuel J. Friedman Theatre, Broadway	
2023	Purlie Victorious	Producer only	Music Box Theatre, Broadway	
2025	Purpose	Director only	Helen Hayes Theater, Broadway	

=== Video games ===
Year	Title	Role	Notes
2003	Little Bill Thinks Big	Brenda Glover	

== Accolades and honors ==
=== Awards and nominations ===
Organizations	Year	Category	Work	Result	Ref.
BET Awards	2015	Theatrical Arts Award	Herself	Honored	
Black Reel Awards	2011	Outstanding Supporting Actress	For Colored Girls	Won	
Black Reel Awards	2024	Outstanding Guest Performance in a Comedy Series	Diarra from Detroit	Won	
Drama Desk Awards	2004	Outstanding Actress in a Play (Note: tied with Viola Davis for Intimate Apparel)	A Raisin in the Sun	Won	
Drama Desk Awards	2022	Outstanding Actress in a Play	Skeleton Crew	Won	
Drama League Awards	2004	Distinguished Performance	A Raisin in the Sun	Nominated	
Drama League Awards	2022	Distinguished Performance	Skeleton Crew	Nominated	
NAACP Image Awards	1988	Outstanding Actress in a Comedy Series	The Cosby Show	Won	
NAACP Image Awards	1989	Outstanding Actress in a Comedy Series	The Cosby Show	Won	
NAACP Image Awards	1997	Outstanding Actress in a Comedy Series	Cosby	Won	
NAACP Image Awards	1998	Outstanding Actress in a Comedy Series	Cosby	Nominated	
NAACP Image Awards	2002	Outstanding Actress in a Television Movie or Mini-Series	The Old Settler	Nominated	
NAACP Image Awards	2009	Outstanding Actress in a Television Movie or Mini-Series	A Raisin in the Sun	Won	
NAACP Image Awards	2011	Outstanding Supporting Actress in a Motion Picture	For Colored Girls	Nominated	
NAACP Image Awards	2013	Outstanding Supporting Actress in a Motion Picture	Good Deeds	Nominated	
NAACP Image Awards	2020	Outstanding Supporting Actress in a Motion Picture	Jingle Jangle: A Christmas Journey	Won	
NAACP Image Awards	2020	Outstanding Character Voice Performance – Motion Picture	Soul	Nominated	
Outer Critics Circle Awards	2004	Outstanding Actress in a Play	A Raisin in the Sun	Nominated	
Outer Critics Circle Awards	2022	Outstanding Featured Actress in a Play	Skeleton Crew	Nominated	
Outer Critics Circle Awards	2025	Outstanding Direction of a Play	Purpose	Nominated	
People's Choice Awards	1985	Favorite Female Performer in a New TV Program	The Cosby Show	Won (Note: Shared with Angela Lansbury for Murder She Wrote.)	
People's Choice Awards	1989	Favorite Female TV Performer	The Cosby Show	Won	
People's Choice Awards	1990	Favorite Female TV Performer	The Cosby Show	Nominated	
Primetime Emmy Awards	1985	Outstanding Lead Actress in a Comedy Series	The Cosby Show (season one)	Nominated	
Primetime Emmy Awards	1986	Outstanding Lead Actress in a Comedy Series	The Cosby Show (season two)	Nominated	
Primetime Emmy Awards	2008	Outstanding Lead Actress in a Miniseries or a Movie	A Raisin in the Sun	Nominated	
Primetime Emmy Awards	2019	Outstanding Guest Actress in a Drama Series	This Is Us (episode: "Our Little Island Girl")	Nominated	
Primetime Emmy Awards	2020	Outstanding Guest Actress in a Drama Series	This is Us (episode: "Flip a Coin")	Nominated	
Primetime Emmy Awards	2021	Outstanding Guest Actress in a Drama Series	This is Us (episode: "I've Got This")	Nominated	
Satellite Awards	1999	Best Actress – Television Series Musical or Comedy	Cosby	Nominated	
Screen Actors Guild Award	2008	Outstanding Actress in a Miniseries or Television Movie	A Raisin in the Sun	Nominated	
Tony Awards	2004	Best Leading Actress in a Play	A Raisin in the Sun	Won	
Tony Awards	2005	Best Leading Actress in a Play	Gem of the Ocean	Nominated	
Tony Awards	2022	Best Featured Actress in a Play	Skeleton Crew	Won	

=== Honorary awards ===
- 2003: Honored as Woman of the Year by the Harvard Black Men's Forum
- 2005: received an honorary Doctor of Fine Arts (D.F.A.) degree from Brown University
- 2011: received an honorary doctorate degree from Spelman College for her work in the Arts
- 2011: named the first Denzel Washington Chair professor in theatre at Fordham University, supported by a $2 million gift from the actor
- 2019: received an honorary Doctor of Fine Arts degree from The University of South Carolina for her work in the Arts and Arts Education

== See also ==
- African-American Tony nominees and winners
