= Skeleton Crew (play) =

Play by Dominique Morisseau

- 2021 Broadway production poster
- Written by: Dominique Morisseau
- Characters: Faye; Reggie; Dez; Shanita
- Series: The Detroit Project
- Setting: Detroit, Michigan, 2008

Premiere
- Date: January 6, 2016
- Place: Atlantic Theater Company

Skeleton Crew is a play written by Dominique Morisseau about an auto factory on the brink of closure in 2008 Detroit, Michigan. It is the third part of Morisseau's Detroit Project, inspired by African-American playwrights, which also includes Paradise Blue and Detroit '67.

== Plot ==
Set in Detroit in 2008, the play follows the workers of an automotive factory, known as the skeleton crew, led by Faye, currently experiencing homelessness. As a longtime employee and union representative who has spent 29 years on the line, she currently works alongside Dez and Shanita. When factory supervisor Reggie reveals that the factory is set to close, Faye must choose between protecting her own stability and standing in solidarity with her fellow workers.

== Productions ==
Skeleton Crew ran Off-Broadway at the Atlantic Theater Company in 2016 and subsequently at the Detroit Public Theatre in 2017. The Atlantic production was directed by Ruben Santiago-Hudson.

It ran on Broadway as a limited-run engagement at Manhattan Theatre Club's Samuel J. Friedman Theatre from December 2021 through February 2022, with Ruben Santiago-Hudson returning as director and starring Phylicia Rashad as Faye. It was one of a series of Broadway shows in the 2021–2022 season written by Black playwrights, and parallels were identified between the play's story and the Omicron surge under which its run fell.

Skeleton Crew premiered in the United Kingdom at the Donmar Warehouse in July 2024 for a one-month run, directed by Matthew Xia.

== Cast and characters ==
Character	Off-Broadway 2016	Broadway 2021
Faye	Lynda Gravátt	Phylicia Rashad
Reggie	Wendell B. Franklin	Brandon J. Dirden
Dez	Jason Dirden	Joshua Boone
Shanita	Nikiya Mathis	Chanté Adams

== Awards and nominations ==
=== Original off-Broadway production ===
Year	Award Ceremony	Category	Nominee	Result	Ref.
2016	Obie Awards	Special Citation: Collaboration	Dominique Morisseau and Ruben Santiago-Hudson	Won	
2016	Drama League Awards	Outstanding Production of a Play		Nominated	
2016	Drama League Awards	Distinguished Performance	Lynda Gravatt	Nominated	

=== Original Broadway production ===
Year	Award Ceremony	Category	Nominee	Result	Ref.
2022	Outer Critics Circle Awards	Outstanding New Broadway Play		Nominated	
2022	Outer Critics Circle Awards	Outstanding Featured Actor in a Play	Brandon J. Dirden	Nominated	
2022	Outer Critics Circle Awards	Outstanding Featured Actress in a Play	Chanté Adams	Nominated	
2022	Outer Critics Circle Awards	Outstanding Featured Actress in a Play	Phylicia Rashad	Nominated	
2022	Outer Critics Circle Awards	Outstanding Director of a Play	Ruben Santiago-Hudson	Nominated	
2022	Drama League Awards	Outstanding Revival of a Play		Nominated	
2022	Drama League Awards	Distinguished Performance	Phylicia Rashad	Nominated	
2022	Drama Desk Awards	Outstanding Revival of a Play		Nominated	
2022	Drama Desk Awards	Outstanding Actor in a Play	Brandon J. Dirden	Nominated	
2022	Drama Desk Awards	Outstanding Actress in a Play	Phylicia Rashad	Won	
2022	Drama Desk Awards	Outstanding Featured Actor in a Play	Joshua Boone	Nominated	
2022	Tony Awards	Best Play		Nominated	
2022	Tony Awards	Best Featured Actress in a Play	Phylicia Rashad	Won	
2022	Tony Awards	Best Scenic Design in a Play	Michael Carnahan and Nicholas Hussong	Nominated	
