= Vivian Nixon =

American actress and dancer (born 1984)

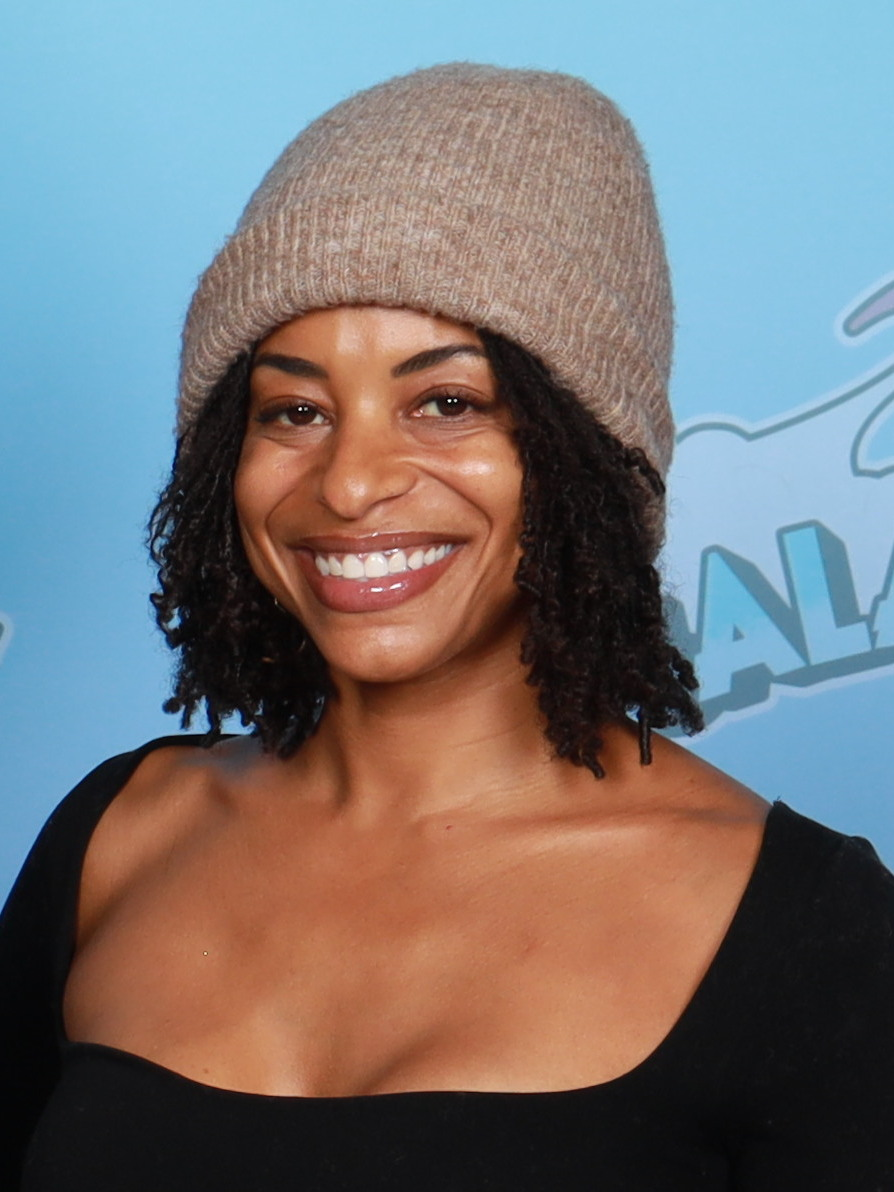
- Nixon at GalaxyCon St. Louis in 2025
- Born: Vivian Nichole Nixon; May 31, 1984 (age 42); Miami, Florida, U.S.
- Occupations: Actress; dancer
- Years active: 1991–present
- Spouse: Jazzton Williams
- Children: 3
- Parents: Norm Nixon (father); Debbie Allen (mother)
- Relatives: DeVaughn Nixon (brother); Phylicia Rashad (aunt); Condola Rashad (cousin)

Vivian Nichole Nixon (born May 31, 1984) is an American actress and dancer. She played Dr. Hannah Brody in the medical drama series Grey's Anatomy and currently voices Millie in the adult animated web series Helluva Boss. She is the daughter of actress Debbie Allen and former basketball player Norm Nixon.

== Early life ==
Born in Miami, Florida, she is one of three children of former NBA star Norm Nixon and actress Debbie Allen. She was named after her grandmother Vivian Ayers-Allen. Her aunt is actress Phylicia Rashad and her younger brother is basketball player Norm E. Nixon Jr. Vivian took gymnastics until a fellow gymnast fell and was seriously injured, and her mother took her out of the sport at age 13. She went on to study at the Kirov Academy of Ballet in Washington, D.C. and at the Debbie Allen Dance Academy.

== Career ==
On her final year of the Ailey/Fordham BFA Program in Dance, Nixon was cast as Kalimba in the Broadway production of Hot Feet, the classic storyline of The Red Shoes with a '70s funk facelift, and Kalimba is the ambitious girl at the center of it who can't stop dancing (literally). She was named of the top "25 to Watch" by Dance Magazine in 2007. Her regional credits, including Alan Johnson's West Side Story (Anita), Bayou Legend (Sara), Pearl (Pearl), Soul Possessed, Dreams, Brothers of the Knight and The Hot Chocolate Nutcracker. She performed on the European tour of West Side Story and Harriet. Nixon has appeared in films 500 Days of Summer and Top Five. On television, she had secondary roles in the Fox musical series Glee and NBC's Smash. In 2015, she began appearing as Dr. Hannah Brody in the ABC medical drama series, Grey's Anatomy. In 2020, she appeared in its spin-off series, Station 19. In October 2020, she began voicing Millie in the web series Helluva Boss in all episodes, except the original pilot, which was later reworked in 2025. Nixon is associate director at Debbie Allen Dance Academy.

== Personal life ==
Nixon has three daughters.

== Filmography ==
=== Film ===
Year	Title	Role	Notes
2009	500 Days of Summer	Dancer	
2010	Louis	Anaya-Bolden's Muse	
2014	Top Five	Jasmine	
2015	Bolden!	Ayan	
2020	Hubie Halloween	DJ Aurora's radio voice	
2020	Christmas on the Square	Bessie	

=== Television ===
Year	Title	Role	Notes
2009	Glee	Andrea Cohen	3 episodes
2009	Everybody Hates Chris	Pretty Woman	Episode: "Everybody Hates Fake IDs"
2012	Smash	Dancer	10 episodes
2013	Boardwalk Empire	Onyx Club Dancer	Episode: "Farewell Daddy Blues"
2014	It Could Be Worse	Receptionist	Episode: "Fate"
2014	Power	Fiona	2 episodes
2015–2020	Grey's Anatomy	Dr. Hannah Brody	Recurring role; 17 episodes
2020	Station 19	Dr. Hannah Brody	2 episodes
2020–present	Helluva Boss	Millie (voice)	YouTube series
