= Debbie Allen =

American actress and dancer (born 1950)

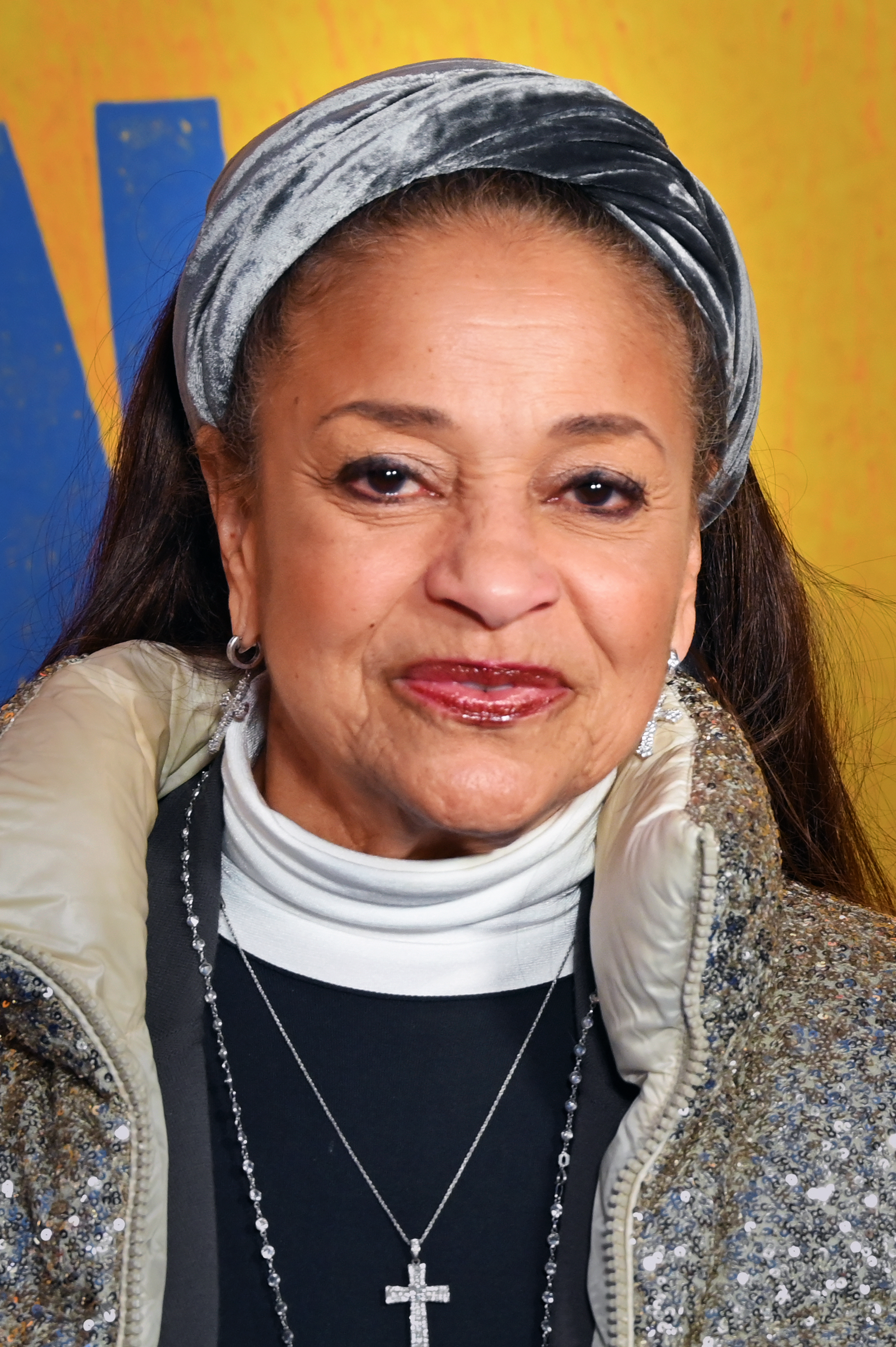
- Allen in 2025
- Born: Deborah Kaye Allen; January 16, 1950 (age 76); Houston, Texas, U.S.
- Education: Howard University (BA)
- Occupations: Actress; dancer; choreographer; singer; television director; television producer
- Years active: 1969–present
- Spouses: Win Wilford (m. 1975; div. 1983) Norm Nixon (m. 1984)
- Children: 3, including Vivian Nixon
- Relatives: Phylicia Rashad (sister); Condola Rashad (niece)

Deborah Kaye Allen (born January 16, 1950) is an American actress, dancer, choreographer, singer, director, producer, and a former member of the President's Committee on the Arts and Humanities. She has been nominated for 22 Emmy Awards (winning six), and two Tony Awards. She has won a Golden Globe Award, and received a star on the Hollywood Walk of Fame in 1991. In 2026, she received an Academy Honorary Award.

Allen is best known for her work in the musical-drama television series Fame (1982–1987), where she portrayed dance teacher Lydia Grant, and served as the series' principal choreographer. For this role in 1983, she received a Golden Globe Award for Best Actress in a Television Series – Musical or Comedy and two Primetime Emmy Awards for Outstanding Choreography and also received four nominations for Outstanding Lead Actress in a Drama Series. Allen later began working as director and producer, most notably producing and directing 83 of 144 episodes of the NBC comedy series A Different World (1988–1993). She returned to acting, playing the leading role in the NBC sitcom In the House from 1995 to 1996, and in 2011, began playing Dr. Catherine Avery in the ABC medical drama Grey's Anatomy, also serving as an executive producer/director. She has directed more than 50 television and film productions.

In 2001, Allen opened the Debbie Allen Dance Academy in Los Angeles, where she currently teaches young dancers. She also taught choreography to former Los Angeles Lakers dancer-turned-singer, Paula Abdul. She is the younger sister of actress Phylicia Rashad.

== Early life ==
Allen was born in Houston, Texas, the third child of orthodontist Andrew Arthur Allen and artist, poet, playwright, scholar, and publisher, Vivian (née Ayers) Allen. She earned a B.A. degree in classical Greek literature, speech, and theater from Howard University and studied acting at HB Studio in New York City. She was a member of Chi Delta Mu Health Professional Fraternity. She holds honoris causa doctorates from Howard University and the University of North Carolina School of the Arts.

=== Challenges ===
Debbie Allen auditioned at the Houston Ballet Academy at the age of twelve, but was denied admission. After another chance, she was admitted a year later by a Russian instructor who accidentally saw her perform in a show. Once recruiters from the academy became aware of the situation, they allowed her to stay because they recognized her talent. While at the academy, she trained under Suzelle Poole.

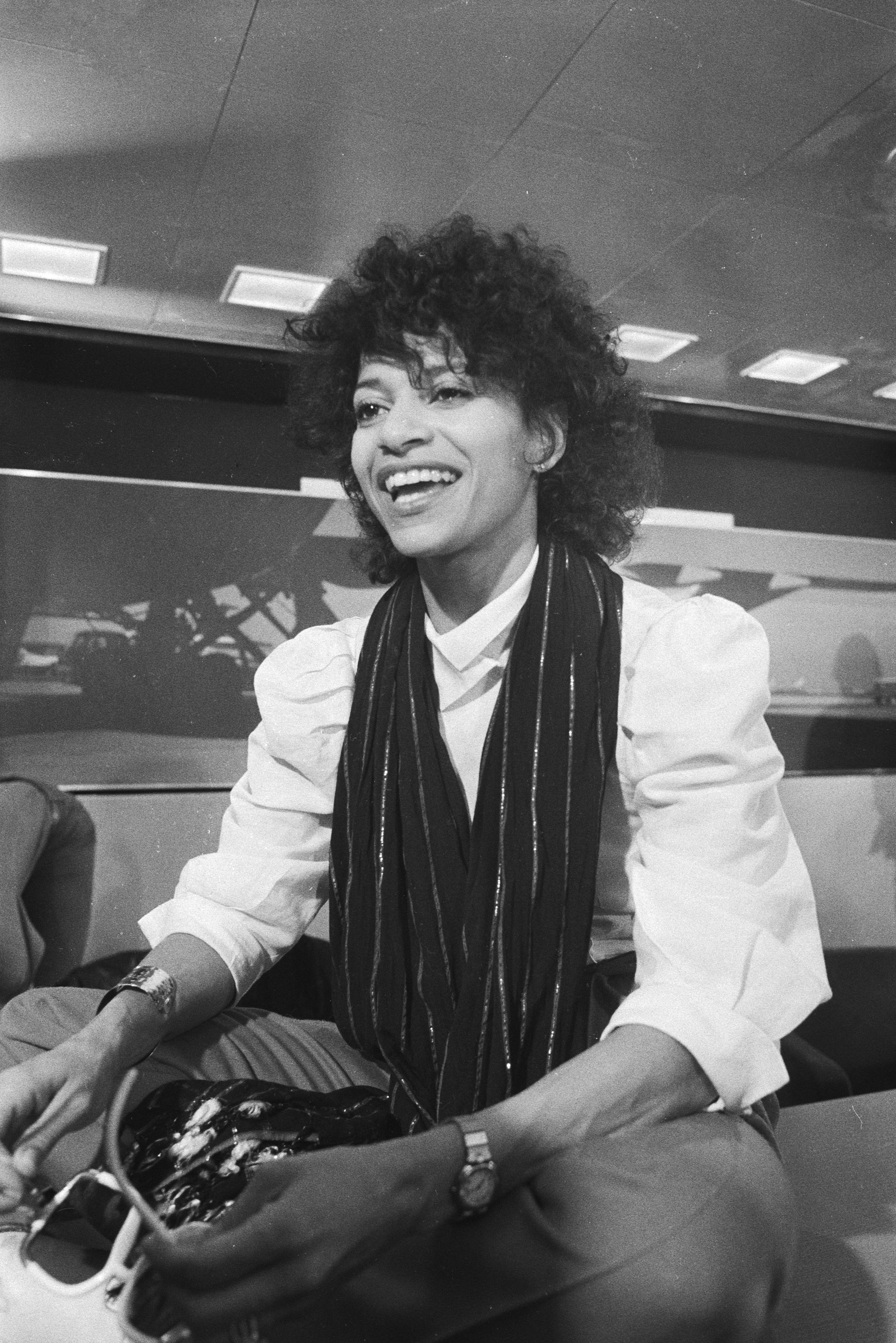
Allen in 1983

Her experience at the Houston Ballet Academy is not the only time Allen was refused. When she was sixteen, she had a successful audition for the North Carolina School of the Arts and was given an opportunity to demonstrate dance techniques to other prospective students applying to the institution. However, she was refused admission and was told her body was not suited to ballet. After numerous rejections, she decided to focus on her academic studies and was on her way to the start of her acting career.

== Career ==
=== 1970–1981: Early works ===
Allen began her career appearing on Broadway theatre. Allen had her Broadway debut in the chorus of Purlie in 1970. She later created the role of Beneatha in the Tony Award-winning musical Raisin (1973), and appeared in Truckload, and Ain't Misbehavin'. In 1980, she received critical attention for her performance as Anita in the Broadway revival of West Side Story which earned her a Tony Award nomination for Best Featured Actress in a Musical and won her a Drama Desk Award for Outstanding Featured Actress in a Musical.

In 1976, Allen made her television debut appearing in the CBS sitcom Good Times in a memorable 2-part episode titled "J.J.'s Fiancée" as J.J.'s drug-addicted fiancée, Diana. The following year, she went to star in the NBC variety show 3 Girls 3. Allen later was selected to appear in the 1979 miniseries Roots: The Next Generations by Alex Haley where she plays the wife of Haley. Also, that year, she made her big screen debut appearing in a supporting role in the comedy film The Fish That Saved Pittsburgh. In 1981, she had the important role of Sarah in the movie version of the best-selling novel Ragtime, a role that earned Audra McDonald a Tony Award in the Broadway musical.

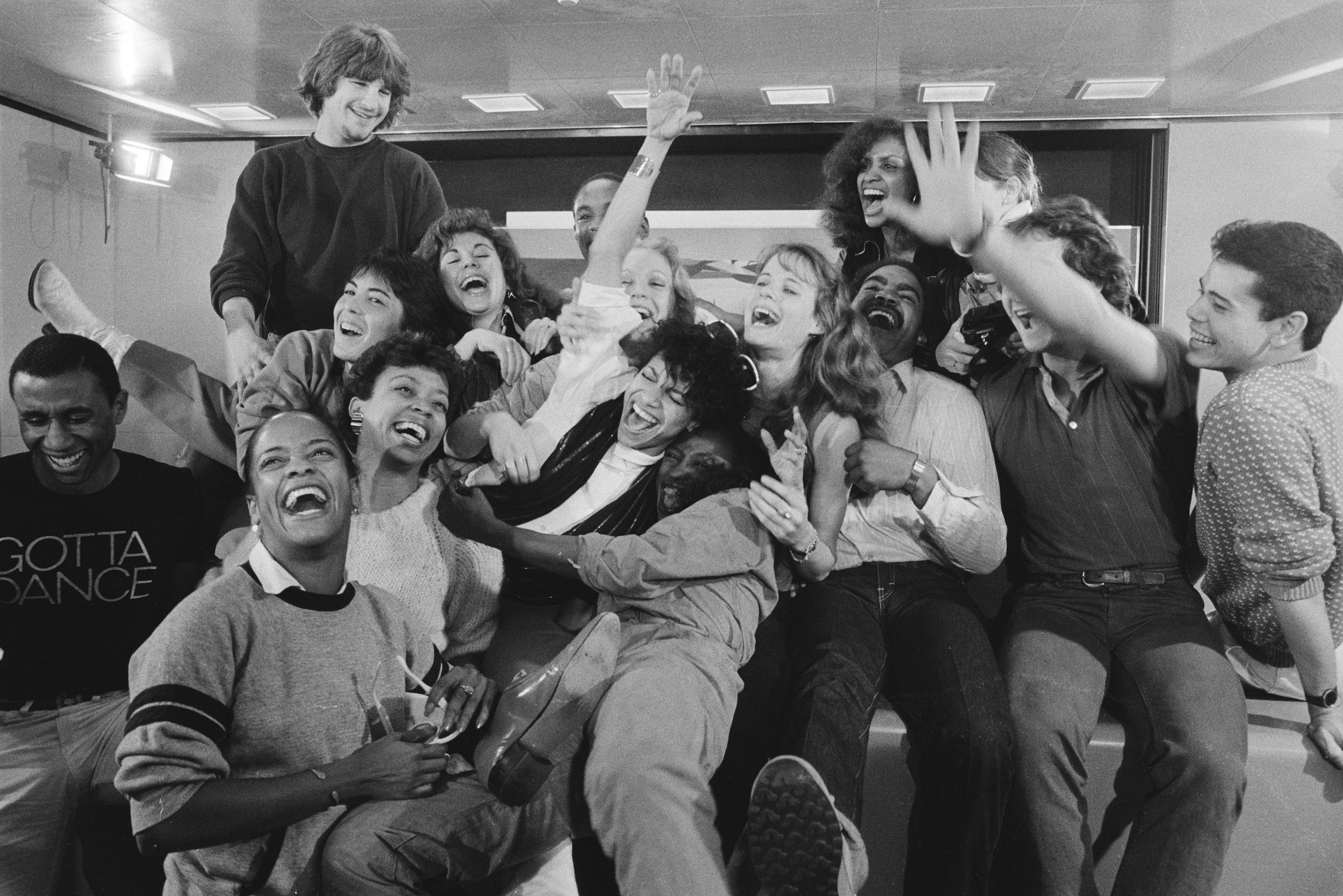
With The Kids from "Fame" (1983). Debbie Allen is center, with sunglasses on top of her head.

=== 1982–1987: Fame ===
In the film Fame (1980), Allen played the role of Lydia Grant. Though the film role was relatively small, Lydia became a central figure in the television adaptation, which ran from 1982 to 1987. During the opening montage of each episode, Grant told her students: "You've got big dreams? You want fame? Well, fame costs. And right here is where you start paying ... in sweat." Allen was nominated for the Emmy Award for Best Actress four times during the show's run. She is the only actress to have appeared in all three screen incarnations of Fame, playing Lydia Grant in both the 1980 film and 1982 television series and playing the school principal in the 2009 remake. Allen was also lead choreographer for the film and television series, winning two Primetime Emmy Award for Outstanding Choreography and one Golden Globe Award for Best Actress in a Television Series – Musical or Comedy. She became the first Black woman to win a Golden Globe for Best Actress in a Television Series—Musical or Comedy.

In 1986, Allen received a second Tony Award nomination, at that time for Best Leading Actress in a Musical, for her performance in the title role of Bob Fosse's Sweet Charity. Also that year, she had a supporting role in the comedy-drama film Jo Jo Dancer, Your Life Is Calling directed, produced by and starring Richard Pryor.

=== 1988–present ===
After Fame, Allen focused on working off-camera and as a choreographer. She choreographed the 1988 Broadway adaptation of Stephen King's “Carrie.” Carrie was a collaboration with her fellow “Fame” alumni Michael Gore, Dean Pitchford, and Gene Anthony Ray. The show opened to mixed reviews and closed after only 16 previews and 5 performances.

==== A Different World ====
In an article from the Museum of Broadcast Communications, The Hollywood Reporter commented on Allen's impact as the producer-director of the television series, A Different World. The show dealt with the lives of students at the fictional historically black college, Hillman. The show ran for six seasons on NBC. The Hollywood Reporter is quoted as stating that when Debbie Allen became the producer (and usually director) of A Different World after the first season, she transformed it "from a bland Cosby spin-off into a lively, socially responsible, ensemble situation comedy." She directed a total of 83 episodes.

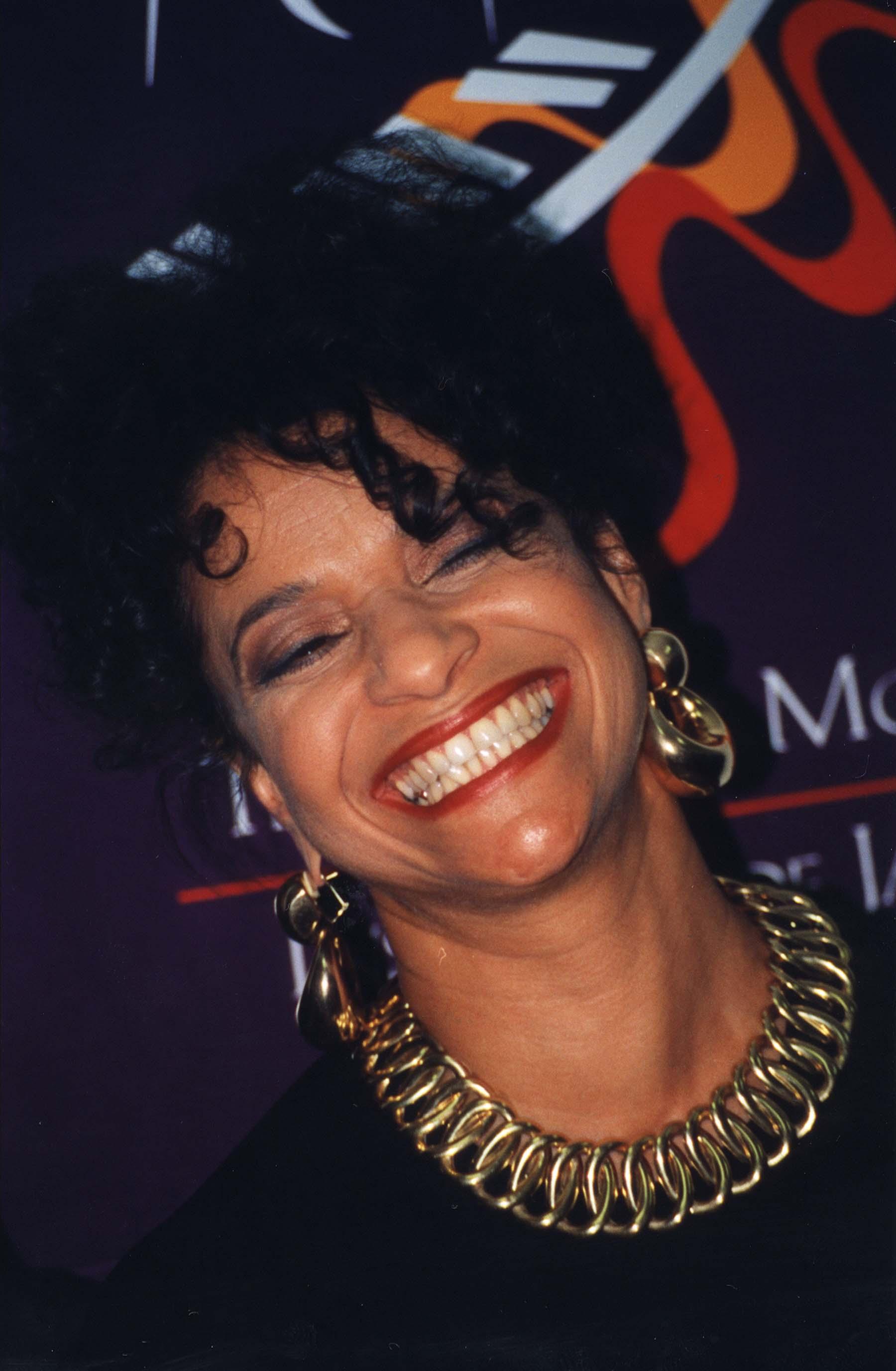
Allen at the Kennedy Center in 1998

==== Singing and choreographing ====
Allen has released two solo albums, Sweet Charity (1986) and Special Look (1989), which also produced several singles. Also that year, she directed musical film Polly. She later directed crime drama film Out-of-Sync (1995) as well as a number of television films. She choreographed the Academy Awards for ten years, six of which were consecutive. In 1995, Allen directed the voice cast and lent her voice to the children's animated series C Bear and Jamal for Film Roman and Fox Kids. That same year, she starred in the NBC sitcom In the House which ran for five seasons. She co-produced the 1997 Steven Spielberg historical drama film Amistad receiving a Producers Guild of America Award.

==== Debbie Allen Dance Academy and So You Think You Can Dance ====
In 2001, Allen founded the Debbie Allen Dance Academy, a 501(c)3 non-profit organization. Since 2007, Allen has participated as a judge and mentor for the U.S. version of So You Think You Can Dance. During Season 4, she stepped aside as a judge at the end of Vegas week to avoid perception of bias, since one of her former dancers, Will, had made it to the top 20.

==== Cat on a Hot Tin Roof ====
In 2008, Allen directed the all-African-American Broadway production of Tennessee Williams' Pulitzer Prize-winning drama Cat on a Hot Tin Roof, starring stage veterans James Earl Jones (Big Daddy), her sister Phylicia Rashad (Big Mama) and Anika Noni Rose (Maggie the Cat), as well as film actor Terrence Howard, who made his Broadway debut as Brick. The production, with some roles recast, had a limited run (2009 – April 2010) in London. She also directed and starred in the 2001 play and its television adaptation The Old Settler.

==== Television director and Grey's Anatomy ====
In the 2000s and 2010s, Allen directed television shows, including 44 episodes of All of Us, as well as Girlfriends, Everybody Hates Chris, How to Get Away with Murder, Empire, Scandal, and Jane the Virgin. In 2011, she joined the cast of ABC medical drama Grey's Anatomy playing the role of Dr. Catherine Fox. As of the 12th season, she served as an executive producer. In 2020, she directed the musical film Christmas on the Square starring Dolly Parton for Netflix.

== Personal life ==
Allen is married to former NBA player Norm Nixon; the couple have three children: dancer Vivian Nichole Nixon (who played Kalimba in the Broadway production of Hot Feet), basketball player Norman Ellard Nixon Jr. (Wofford College and Southern University), and DeVaughn Nixon. She was previously married to Win Wilford from 1975 to 1983.

Allen is the sister of actress/director/singer Phylicia Rashad (she guest starred in an episode of The Cosby Show and Rashad in an episode of In the House and also Grey's Anatomy), Tex Allen (Andrew Arthur Allen III, born 1945), a jazz composer, and Hugh W. Allen, a real estate banker, who appeared on three episodes of A Different World as Quincy Tolleson.

== Filmography ==
=== Film ===
| Year | Title | Role | Notes |
|---|---|---|---|
| 1979 | The Fish That Saved Pittsburgh | Ola | |
| 1980 | Fame | Lydia Grant | |
| 1981 | Ragtime | Sarah | |
| 1986 | Jo Jo Dancer, Your Life Is Calling | Michelle | |
| 1994 | Blank Check | Yvonne | |
| 1995 | Out-of-Sync | Manicurist | Director and producer |
| 1997 | Amistad | | Producer; Producers Guild of America Visionary Award – Theatrical Motion Pictures; Nominated—Producers Guild of America Award for Best Theatrical Motion Picture; Nominated—Satellite Award for Best Motion Picture, Drama |
| 2000 | Everything's Jake | Librarian | |
| 2001 | All About You | Ruth | |
| 2001 | The Painting | Bertha Lee Gilmore | Executive producer |
| 2005 | Confessions of an Action Star | Herself / Deity | |
| 2007 | Tournament of Dreams | Rhonda Dillins | |
| 2009 | Next Day Air | Ms. Jackson | |
| 2009 | Fame | Principal Angela Simms | |
| 2013 | A Star for Rose | Rose | Producer |
| 2020 | Dance Dreams: Hot Chocolate Nutcracker | Herself | |

=== Television ===
| Year | Title | Role | Notes |
|---|---|---|---|
| 1976 | Good Times | Diana Buchanan | Episodes: "J.J.'s Fiancée: Part 1 " and "J.J.'s Fiancée: Part 2" |
| 1977 | 3 Girls 3 | Herself | 4 episodes |
| 1977 | The Greatest Thing That Almost Happened | Julie Sutton | Television film |
| 1979 | Roots: The Next Generations | Nan Branch Haley | Episode: "Part VI (1939–1950)" |
| 1979 | Ebony, Ivory & Jade | Claire 'Ebony' Bryant | Television film |
| 1982 | Alice at the Palace | Red Queen | Television film |
| 1979–1983 | The Love Boat | Selena Moore / Reesa Marlowe | 3 episodes (1979 (S02, E22); 1983 (S06, E18-E19) |
| 1983 | Women of San Quentin | Carol Freeman | Television film |
| 1983 | Live... And in Person | Herself | TV special Nominated—Primetime Emmy Award for Outstanding Individual Performance in a Variety or Music Program |
| 1984 | Celebrity | Regina Brown | Miniseries |
| 1985 | Motown Returns to the Apollo | Herself | TV special Nominated—Primetime Emmy Award for Outstanding Original Music and Lyrics |
| 1986 | An All-Star Celebration Honoring Martin Luther King Jr. | Herself | TV special Nominated—Primetime Emmy Award for Outstanding Individual Performance in a Variety or Music Program |
| 1987 | Square One Television | Herself | Season 1 Episode 10 |
| 1982–1987 | Fame | Lydia Grant | Series regular, 136 episodes, also producer Golden Globe Award for Best Actress – Television Series Musical or Comedy (1983); Primetime Emmy Award for Outstanding Choreography (1982–1983); Golden Apple Award for Female Discovery of the Year (1982); NAACP Image Award for Outstanding Actress in a Drama Series; Nominated—Golden Globe Award for Best Actress – Television Series Musical or Comedy (1984–1985); Nominated—Primetime Emmy Award for Outstanding Lead Actress in a Drama Series (1982–1985); Nominated—Primetime Emmy Award for Outstanding Choreography (1984–1985) |
| 1988 | The Cosby Show | Emma | Episode: "If the Dress Fits, Wear It" |
| 1991 | Quantum Leap | Joanna Chapman | Episode: "Private Dancer - October 6, 1979" |
| 1991 | Motown 30: What's Goin' On! | Herself | TV special Primetime Emmy Award for Outstanding Choreography |
| 1991 | Sunday in Paris | Sunday Chase | Unsold TV pilot, also executive producer |
| 1992 | 64th Academy Awards | Herself | TV special Nominated—Primetime Emmy Award for Outstanding Choreography |
| 1992 | Stompin' at the Savoy | Estelle | Television film, also director |
| 1988–1993 | A Different World | Dr. Langhorne/Herself | 122 episodes, showrunner and producer |
| 1993 | 65th Academy Awards | Herself | TV special Nominated—Primetime Emmy Award for Outstanding Choreography |
| 1995 | 67th Academy Awards | Herself | TV special NAACP Image Award for Outstanding Choreography in Film or Television; Nominated—Primetime Emmy Award for Outstanding Choreography |
| 1995–1996 | In the House | Jackie Warren | Series regular, 26 episodes |
| 1996 | Touched by an Angel | Valerie Hill | Episode: "Sins of the Father" |
| 1997 | Cosby | Debra | Episode: "Dating Games" |
| 1999 | 71st Academy Awards | Herself | TV special Nominated—Primetime Emmy Award for Outstanding Choreography |
| 1999 | Michael Jordan: An American Hero | Deloris Jordan | Television film |
| 2001 | The Old Settler | Quilly | Television film, also executive producer |
| 2003 | The Division | Wanda | Episode: "Bewitched, Bothered and Bewildered" |
| 2004 | All of Us | Kate | Episode: "Parents Just Don't Understand" |
| 2007–2014 | So You Think You Can Dance | Herself - Guest Judge | 21 episodes |
| 2011 | Grace | Helen Grace | Unsold TV pilot, also executive producer |
| 2011–present | Grey's Anatomy | Dr. Catherine Avery Fox | Recurring role, also executive producer Nominated—NAACP Image Award for Outstanding Supporting Actress in a Drama Series (2014) |
| 2013 | Let's Stay Together | Cougar | Episode: "Kita's Got a Gun" |
| 2016 | Dance Moms | Herself | Episodes: "Abby's Replaceable" and "Debbie Allen to the Rescue" |
| 2016 | Jane the Virgin | Beverly Flores | Episode: "Chapter Forty-Three" |
| 2018 | Raven's Home | Aunt Maureen | Episode: "Switch or Treat" |
| 2018–2025 | S.W.A.T. | Charice Harrelson | Recurring role |
| 2020 | Grace and Frankie | Dorothy | Episode: "The Short Rib" |
| 2022–2023 | The Proud Family: Louder and Prouder | Myrtie (voice) | 2 episodes |

=== Director ===
| Year | Title | Notes |
|---|---|---|
| 1984 | Janet Jackson: Dream Street | |
| 1984–1987 | Fame | 11 episodes |
| 1987 | The Bronx Zoo | Episode: "Lost and Found" |
| 1987–1989 | Family Ties | Episodes: "The Play's the Thing" and "Higher Love" |
| 1989 | The Debbie Allen Special | Nominated—Primetime Emmy Award for Outstanding Directing for a Variety Series; Nominated—Primetime Emmy Award for Outstanding Choreography |
| 1989 | Polly | Television film Nominated—Primetime Emmy Award for Outstanding Choreography |
| 1990 | Melba Moore: Lift Every Voice and Sing | |
| 1990 | The Fresh Prince of Bel-Air | Episodes: "Bang the Drum, Ashley" and "The Fresh Prince Project" |
| 1990 | Polly: Comin' Home! | Television film |
| 1992 | The Boys | Unsold TV pilot, also executive producer |
| 1992 | Stompin' at the Savoy | Television film |
| 1991–1993 | Quantum Leap | Episodes: "Revenge of the Evil Leaper - September 16, 1987" and "Private Dancer - October 6, 1979" |
| 1993 | Sinbad: Afros and Bellbottoms | |
| 1988–1993 | A Different World | 83 episodes, producer in 122 episodes |
| 1993–1994 | The Sinbad Show | 7 episodes |
| 1997 | Between Brothers | Episodes: "The List" and "The Big Three-Oh" |
| 1997–1998 | The Jamie Foxx Show | Episode: "Soul Mate to Cellmate" and "Misery Loves Company" |
| 1998 | Linc's | Episode: "March on Washington: Part 1" |
| 1998 | Martin Luther King Special One Day | Television film, also executive producer |
| 1999 | Kirk Franklin: The Nu Nation Tour | |
| 2001 | The Old Settler | Television film, also executive producer |
| 2002 | Cool Women | Nominated—Daytime Emmy Award for Outstanding Special Class Directing |
| 2003 | The Twilight Zone | Episode: "The Monsters Are on Maple Street" |
| 2003 | The Parkers | Episode: "The Good, the Bad, and the Funny" |
| 2004–2006 | That's So Raven | 5 episodes |
| 2006 | Life Is Not a Fairytale: The Fantasia Barrino Story | Television film |
| 2006 | I Was a Network Star | Documentary film |
| 2003–2007 | All of Us | 44 episodes |
| 2005–2008 | Girlfriends | 9 episodes |
| 2008 | The Game | Episode: "Oh, What a Night" |
| 2006–2009 | Everybody Hates Chris | 10 episodes |
| 2010–2011 | Hellcats | Episodes: "Land of 1,000 Dances" and "Pledging My Love" |
| 2010–present | Grey's Anatomy | 31 episodes Also executive producer Nominated—NAACP Image Award for Outstanding Directing in a Drama Series |
| 2013 | The Client List | Episode: "Heaven's Just a Sin Away" |
| 2013 | Army Wives | Episode: "Adjustment Period" |
| 2013 | Let's Stay Together | 3 episodes |
| 2014 | Witches of East End | Episode: "Boogie Knight" |
| 2014 | How to Get Away with Murder | Episode: "He Has a Wife" |
| 2015 | Empire | Episode: "Who I Am" |
| 2014–2015 | Scandal | 3 episodes |
| 2014–2015 | Jane the Virgin | Episodes: "Chapter Four" and "Chapter Twenty" |
| 2015 | Survivor's Remorse | Episode: "Guts" |
| 2016 | Insecure | Episode: "Guilty as Fuck" |
| 2018 | Step Up: High Water | Episode: "Solo" |
| 2020 | Dolly Parton's Christmas on the Square | Primetime Emmy Award for Outstanding Television Movie; Primetime Emmy Award for Outstanding Choreography for Scripted Programming |
| 2021 | The Ms. Pat Show | Episode: "Pilot: Duck" |

=== Writer ===
- Movement magazine, regular columnist since 2006
- Dancing in the Wings paperback, by Debbie Allen (Author), Kadir Nelson (Illustrator)
- Brothers of the Knight paperback, by Debbie Allen (Author), Kadir Nelson (Illustrator)

=== Discography ===
- Special Look (1989)

== Awards and nominations ==
=== Academy Awards ===
| Year | Category | Nominated work | Result | Ref. |
|---|---|---|---|---|
| 2025 | Academy Honorary Award | Herself | Honored | |

=== Drama Desk Awards ===
| Year | Category | Nominated work | Result | Ref. |
|---|---|---|---|---|
| 1980 | Outstanding Featured Actress in a Musical | West Side Story | Won | |
| 1986 | Outstanding Actress in a Musical | Sweet Charity | Nominated | |

=== Emmy Awards ===
| Year | Category | Nominated work | Result | Ref. |
Primetime Emmy Awards
| 1982 | Outstanding Lead Actress in a Drama Series | Fame | Nominated | |
| 1982 | Outstanding Achievement in Choreography | Fame | Won | |
| 1983 | Outstanding Achievement in Choreography | Fame | Won | |
| 1983 | Outstanding Lead Actress in a Drama Series | Fame | Nominated | |
| 1984 | Outstanding Lead Actress in a Drama Series | Fame | Nominated | |
| 1984 | Outstanding Individual Performance in a Variety or Music Program | Live...And In Person | Nominated | |
| 1984 | Outstanding Achievement in Choreography | Fame Takes a Look at Music '83 | Nominated | |
| 1985 | Outstanding Achievement in Choreography | Fame | Nominated | |
| 1985 | Outstanding Lead Actress in a Drama Series | Fame | Nominated | |
| 1985 | Outstanding Achievement in Music and Lyrics | Motown Returns to the Apollo | Nominated | |
| 1986 | Outstanding Individual Performance in a Variety or Music Program | An All Star Celebration Honoring Martin Luther King Jr. | Nominated | |
| 1989 | Outstanding Directing in a Variety or Music Program | The Debbie Allen Special | Nominated | |
| 1989 | Outstanding Achievement in Choreography | The Debbie Allen Special | Nominated | |
| 1990 | Outstanding Achievement in Choreography | Polly The Magical World of Disney | Nominated | |
| 1991 | Outstanding Achievement in Choreography | Motown 30: What's Goin' On! | Won | |
| 1992 | Outstanding Individual Achievement in Choreography | The 64th Annual Academy Awards | Nominated | |
| 1993 | Outstanding Individual Achievement in Choreography | The 65th Annual Academy Awards | Nominated | |
| 1995 | Outstanding Individual Achievement in Choreography | The 67th Annual Academy Awards | Nominated | |
| 1999 | Outstanding Choreography | The 71st Annual Academy Awards | Nominated | |
| 2021 | Outstanding Television Movie | Dolly Parton's Christmas on the Square | Won | |
| 2021 | Outstanding Choreography for Scripted Programming | Dolly Parton's Christmas on the Square | Won | |
| 2021 | Governors Award | Herself | Honored | |
| 2022 | Hall of Fame | Herself | Inducted | |
Daytime Emmy Awards
| 2001 | Outstanding Special Class Directing | Cool Women | Nominated | |

=== Golden Globe Awards ===
| Year | Category | Nominated work | Result | Ref. |
|---|---|---|---|---|
| 1982 | Best Actress in a Television Series – Musical or Comedy | Fame | Won | |
| 1983 | Best Actress in a Television Series – Musical or Comedy | Fame | Nominated | |
| 1984 | Best Actress in a Television Series – Musical or Comedy | Fame | Nominated | |

=== Tony Awards ===
| Year | Category | Nominated work | Result | Ref. |
|---|---|---|---|---|
| 1980 | Best Featured Actress in a Musical | West Side Story | Nominated | |
| 1986 | Best Leading Actress in a Musical | Sweet Charity | Nominated | |

=== Miscellaneous honors ===
- Allen has held the Primetime Emmy Award for Outstanding Choreography record for most wins and most nominations.
- Allen was appointed by President George W. Bush in 2001 as a member of the President's Committee on the Arts and Humanities.
- For her contributions to the television industry, Debbie Allen was honored in 1991 with a star on the Hollywood Walk of Fame at 6904 Hollywood Boulevard in the center of Hollywood directly opposite the Dolby Theatre at Hollywood & Highland Center.
- Allen was presented with the George and Ira Gershwin Award for Lifetime Musical Achievement, at the 1992 UCLA Spring Sing.
- 10 NAACP Image Awards as a director, actress, choreographer, and producer for Fame, A Different World, Motown 25, The Academy Awards, The Debbie Allen Special and Amistad.
- On February 4, 2009, Debbie Allen was honored for her contributions to dance and was presented with a Lifetime Achievement Award by Nia Peeples at The Carnival: Choreographer's Ball 10th anniversary show.
- Allen was awarded an honorary doctorate from the North Carolina School of the Arts, as well as from her alma mater, Howard University.
- 2020 Kennedy Center Honoree

== See also ==
- African-American Tony nominees and winners
