= Pipeline (play) =

2017 play written by Dominique Morisseau

- Written by: Dominique Morisseau
- Characters: Nya; Omari; Jasmine; Xavier; Laurie; Dun
- Original language: English
- Genre: Drama
- Setting: Inner city

Premiere
- Date premiered: July 10, 2017
- Place premiered: Mitzi E. Newhouse Theater, Manhattan, New York City

Pipeline is a 2017 play written by Dominique Morisseau. It originally opened Off-Broadway on July 10, 2017, and closed on August 27, 2017.

== Productions ==
The show premiered on Off-Broadway at the Mitzi E. Newhouse Theater on July 10, 2017, directed by Lileana Blain-Cruz, set design Matt Saunders, costume design Montana Levi Bianco, lighting design Yi Zhao, sound design Justin Ellington, and production design by Hannah Wasileski. The cast included Karen Pittman (Nya), Namir Smallwood (Omari), Heather Velazquez (Jasmine), Morocco Omari (Xavier), Tasha Lawrence (Laurie), and Jamie Lincoln Smith (Dun).

== Reviews ==
Ben Brantley of The New York Times said the play was "passionate but frustratingly unresolved play about a family struggling to outrun social prophecy." Frank Scheck of The Hollywood Reporter said "While there are some powerful moments, Pipeline overall fails to come to life." Marilyn Stasio of the Variety stated the play was "emotionally harrowing, ethically ambiguous drama that raises barbed questions about class, race, parental duty, and the state of American education."

== Awards and nominations ==
Year	Award	Category	Nominee	Result
2018	Lucille Lortel Awards	Outstanding Play	Dominique Morisseau	Nominated
2018	Lucille Lortel Awards	Outstanding Director	Lileana Blain-Cruz	Nominated
2018	Lucille Lortel Awards	Outstanding Lead Actress in a Play	Karen Pittman	Nominated
2018	Lucille Lortel Awards	Outstanding Lead Actor in a Play	Namir Smallwood	Nominated
2018	Lucille Lortel Awards	Outstanding Projection Design	Hannah Wasileski	Won
2018	Outer Critics Circle Award	John Gassner Award	Dominique Morisseau	Nominated
