= Kumler Hall =

- U.S. National Register of Historic Places
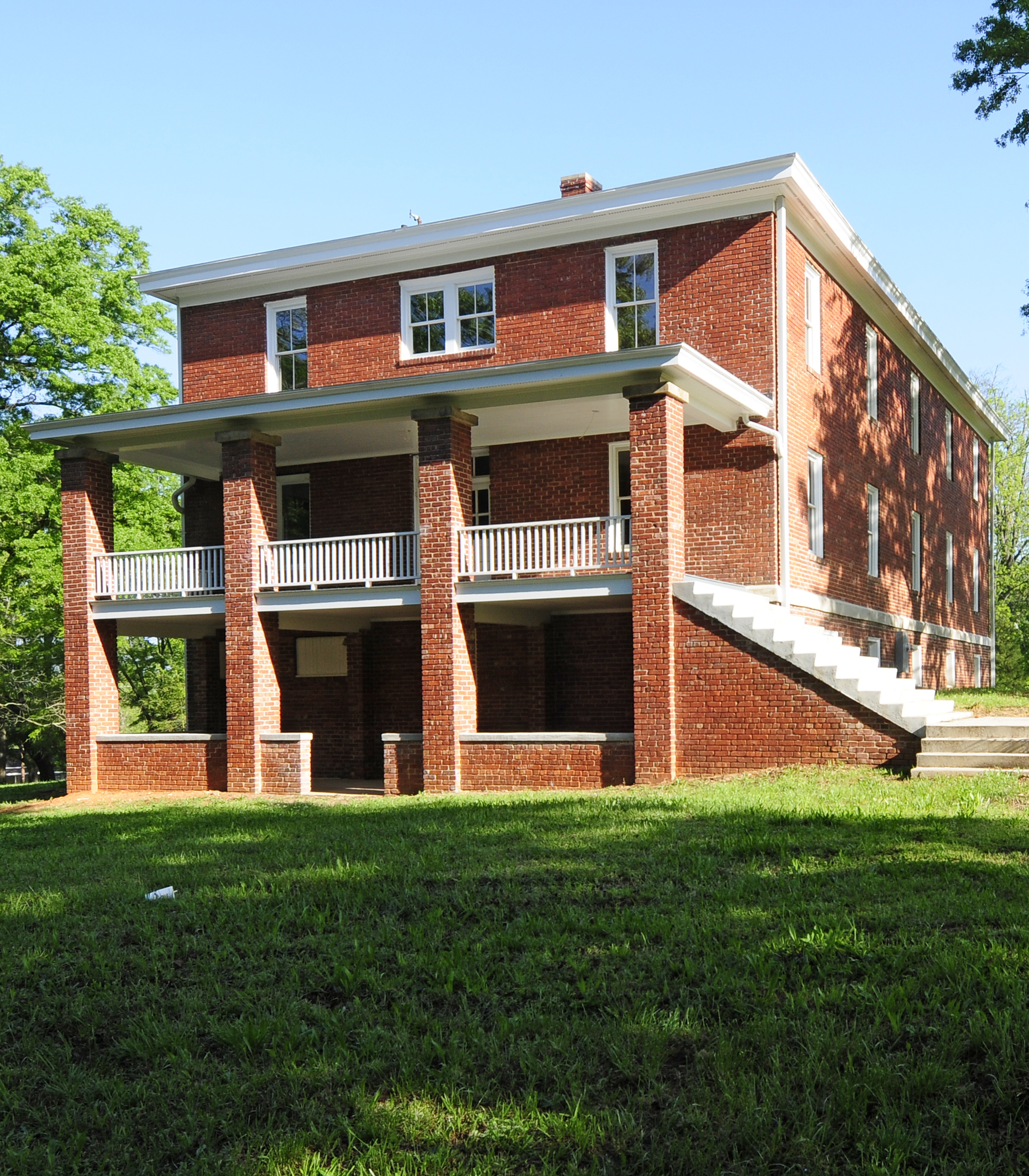
- Kumler Hall, April 2012

- Location within South Carolina Location within the United States
- Location: Lancaster and Cemetery Sts., Chester, South Carolina
- Coordinates: 34°42′27″N 81°11′19″W
- Area: 1.5 acres (0.61 ha)
- Built: 1916
- NRHP reference No.: 83002190
- Added to NRHP: January 27, 1983

Kumler Hall is a historic dormitory that was part of the Brainerd Institute, in Chester, Chester County, South Carolina. Brainerd Institute was one of the earliest and finest of the many private schools established for African-American freedmen in South Carolina in the years just after the American Civil War. The school operated from about 1868 until 1939 by the Board of Missions of the Presbyterian Church.

Kumler Hall was built about 1916, and is a brick two-story boys dormitory. It has a central longitudinal hallway opening onto the porch, with a central single-flight stairway and classrooms and dormitory rooms opening on either side on both floors and the basement.

It was listed on the National Register of Historic Places in 1983.
