= Detroit Public Theatre =

Nonprofit professional theatre in Detroit, Michigan

The Detroit Public Theatre (DPT) is a nonprofit professional theatre in Detroit, Michigan, that produces plays and programs.

== Company ==
The theatre is partially supported by the Michigan Arts & Culture Council and National Endowment for the Arts.

== History ==
The DPT was founded in 2015 by Courtney Burkett, Sarah Clare Corporandy, and Sarah Winkler, who are now producing artistic directors of the theatre. The founders created the theatre company after noticing that the city lacked an institution that was home to professional theatre with both local and national artists. The DPT began producing in 2015 out of the Max M. Fisher Music Center. In 2016, it produced Detroit ’67, a play written by playwright and actress Dominique Morisseau.

Several years after its founding, the DPT built and moved into its own theatre space at 3960 Third Street in Midtown, which opened on September 21, 2022. The new space can accommodate around 200 people.

== Notable productions ==
Here There are Blueberries: With its script written by Moisés Kaufman and Amanda Gronich, DPT's was the first licensed production in the United States. It retells the 2007 event where previously unseen photos from World War II revealed further information about the Holocaust upon the discovery of Rebecca Erbelding and other historians. This production kicked off DPT's 2025-2026 season in October 2025.

Fat Ham: The DPT staged the play that was written by James Ijames. It offers a new take on Shakespeare’s Hamlet. This production opened the company's tenth anniversary season. The production play through November 3, 2024.
