= Suzelle Poole =

English ballerina (born 1940)

- Born: Suzelle Engelsmith; 1940 (age 84–85); Chelsea, London, England, United Kingdom
- Occupation(s): Ballet dancer, dance teacher, poet
- Spouse: Johnathan William Poole
- Children: 2
- Career
- Current group: The Poole Ballet
- Former groups: Houston Ballet
- Website: suzellepoole.com

Suzelle Poole, also known as Madame Poole, (née Engelsmith; born 1940) is an English ballet dancer, dance teacher, and poet. She is a former soloist with Houston Ballet and is known for continuing to perform ballet in her seventies.

== Early life and training ==
Poole was born Suzelle Engelsmith in Chelsea, London in 1940. Her father, George Englesmith, was an architect for the Ministry of Works and her mother, Lydia Englesmith, was a French linguist. Growing up during World War II, the back steps of her house were hit during The Blitz. She was inspired to start training in classical ballet after seeing Margot Fonteyn perform. After the war, her family moved to Canada. She began dancing classical ballet when she was seven years old, training in the Cecchetti method.

== Career ==
Poole danced professionally under the direction of Betty Oliphant and Celia Franca, the founders of the National Ballet School of Canada. Poole joined the Houston Ballet in Texas and was promoted to the rank of soloist by Tatiana Semenova. While dancing with Houston Ballet, Poole taught at the Houston Ballet Academy as an assistant teacher for children ages six to eleven. One of her students at the ballet academy was Debbie Allen. After eight years in Houston, she moved back to England to perform as a free-lance ballet dancer, travelling around England and Scotland, and performed with the Royal Ballet School. She was part of the national tour of The Merry Widow, dancing with John Inman and Nigel Lythgoe.

Poole moved to South Africa and obtained an Associate Montessori International Diploma. She worked as a director of a Montessori school in South Africa and lectured on music pedagogy at the University of Cape Town. She also spent time in Germany teaching dance and music. In 1986 she moved to Dallas and worked as a dance teacher and choreographer and lectured part-time at the University of Dallas.

While in her seventies, Poole still performs classical ballet en pointe with students at Tuzer Dance Academy and the Royale Ballet Dance Academy in Dallas and members of her ballet company, The Poole Ballet. She also performs ballet concerts in local retirement homes.

She has published three books of poetry: Rodosto: A Poem about a Horse, Kitten: Poems for Little Children and I See the World in Motion: Including Ballet Class. Poole was a recipient of the Golden Poetry Award from the American Poetry Society.

In 2017 she was featured in the BBC Three series Amazing Humans.

In 2019 she gave a TedXTalk called Dancing Beyond All Limits.

== Personal life ==
Poole was married to Jonathan William Poole, an English opera singer. John died in 2003. She has two children.
