= Blood at the Root (play) =

Play by Dominique Morisseau

- Original language: English
- Written by: Dominique Morisseau
- Characters: Raylynn; Toria; Asha; Justin; Colin; Deandre
- Genre: Drama
- Setting: Louisiana

Premiere
- Date: March 28, 2014
- Place: Penn State Center Stage; Pennsylvania State University

Blood at the Root is a play by Dominique Morisseau that premiered in 2014 at Pennsylvania State University. The title Blood at the Root comes from the song Strange Fruit about the lynchings of African Americans in the South. The show was based on the Jena Six.

== Productions ==
The show premiered at Penn State Center Stage at Pennsylvania State University on March 28, 2014, directed by Steve H. Broadnax, choreography Aquila Kikora Franklin, set design Karl Jacobsen, costume design Montana Carly Reeder, lighting design Nathan Hawkins, and sound design Liz Sokolak. The cast included Stori Ayers (Raylynn), Allison Scarlet Jaye (Toria), Kenzie Ross (Asha), Brandon Carter (Justin), Tyler Reilly (Colin), and Christian Thompson (De'Andre). It would premiere two years later in New York City at the National Black Theatre.
