= Hot Feet =

Broadway jukebox musical

- Playbill cover
- Music: Earth, Wind & Fire
- Lyrics: Earth, Wind & Fire
- Book: Heru Ptah
- Basis: The Red Shoes, fairy tale by Hans Christian Andersen
- Productions: 2006 Washington, D.C. 2006 Broadway

Hot Feet is a jukebox musical featuring the music of Earth, Wind & Fire, a book by Heru Ptah and was conceived, directed, and choreographed by Maurice Hines. The musical opened on Broadway at the Lyric Theatre (then the Hilton Theatre) on April 30, 2006 and closed on July 23, 2006.

== Plot synopsis ==
Hot Feet is about a beautiful young dancer whose dream is to dance on Broadway. When she puts on a pair of magical red shoes, they begin to take control of her fate. This story is a modern retelling of "The Red Shoes", an 1845 fairy tale by Hans Christian Andersen.

== Production history ==
Hot Feet premiered in Washington, D.C. at the National Theatre on March 6, 2006 and closed on April 9. Directed and choreographed by Maurice Hines, the cast featured Allen Hidalgo, Ann Duquesnay, Keith David, Michael Balderrama, Samantha Pollino, Vivian Nixon, and Wynonna Smith. The show received mostly negative reviews from critics. The original production was two hours and forty-five minutes in length.

A slightly different incarnation of Hot Feet began previews on Broadway on April 20, 2006 after being delayed twice to allow Heru Ptah more time to rework the book, which was brutally criticized by the Washington critics. On April 30, 2006, after only a 10 preview period, the musical finally opened on Broadway. It received harsh reviews, with the talkinbroadway reviewer calling the show a "nuclear meltdown of a jukebox musical". The USA Today reviewer wrote that the show "isn't a disaster" but that she was disappointed".

Due to poor ticket sales, the musical closed on July 23, 2006 after 12 previews and 97 regular performances. A cast recording was never produced.

== Musical numbers ==
Act I

- Overture - The Band
- "Hot Feet"† - Louie
- "In the Stone" - The Band
- "Rock That/Boogie Wonderland" - The Band and Lead Vocals
- "When I Dance" - The Band and Lead Vocals
- "Dearest Heart"† - Mom and Kalimba
- "September" - The Band and Lead Vocals
- "Turn it into Something Good" - The Band and Lead Vocals
- "Ponta de Areia" - The Band and Lead Vocals
- "Thinking of You" - The Band and Lead Vocals
- "Mighty, Mighty" - The Band and Lead Vocals
- "Serpentine Fire" - The Band and Lead Vocals
- "Fantasy" - The Band and Lead Vocals

Act II

- "Louie's Welcome"† - Louie
- "Getaway" - The Band and Lead Vocals
- "Dirty" - The Band and Lead Vocals
- "After the Love Has Gone" - The Band and Lead Vocals
- "Can't Hide Love"† - Victor
- "You Don't Know"† - Mom and Victor
- "Kali"† - Mom
- The "Hot Feet Ballet" - The Band, Louie and Lead Vocals
  - "Intro"
  - "Hot Feet"
  - "Let Your Feelings Show"
  - "System of Survival"
  - "Saturday Night"
  - "Africano"
  - "Star"
  - "Faces"
- "Kali Reprise"† - Mom
- "Mega Mix" - The Band and Lead Vocals
- "September" - The Band and Lead Vocals
- "Shining Star" - Full Company
- "Gratitude" - The Band and Lead Vocals

† Indicates new songs and are sung onstage. All other songs are sung offstage by live background band vocalists.

== Original Broadway cast ==
- Vivian Nixon - Kalimba
- Michael Balderrama - Anthony
- Keith David - Victor
- Ann Duquesnay - Mom
- Allen Hidalgo - Louie
- Brent Carter - Band Vocalist
- Keith Anthony Fluitt - Band Vocalist
- Theresa Thomason - Band Vocalist
- Samantha Pollino- Emma
