= Brainerd Institute =

School for Blacks in Chester, South Carolina

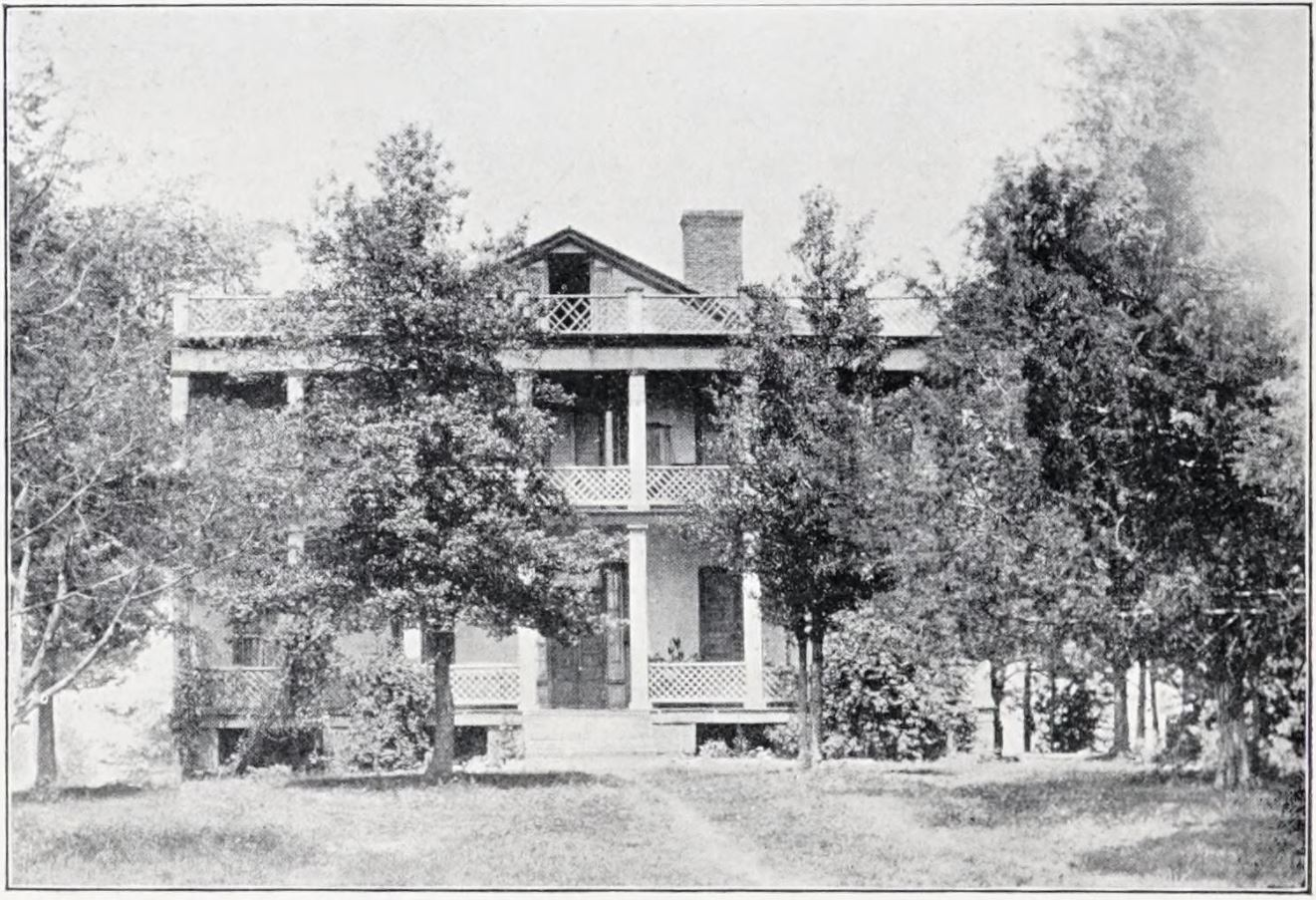
- The school c. 1910

Location
- Chester, South Carolina; United States

Information
- Established: 1868
- Closed: 1939

Brainerd Institute was a school for African Americans in Chester, South Carolina. It was founded by the Presbyterian Church and opened in 1868. Alumni include Vivian Ayers Allen and Daniel Jackson Sanders. Originally an elementary school it served 10 grades by 1913. It expanded to include Brainerd Junior College, a teacher training program, in 1934. It closed in 1939 as competition from public schools increased.

Originally established with support from the Freedmen's Bureau, the school was later sponsored by the Presbyterian Church.

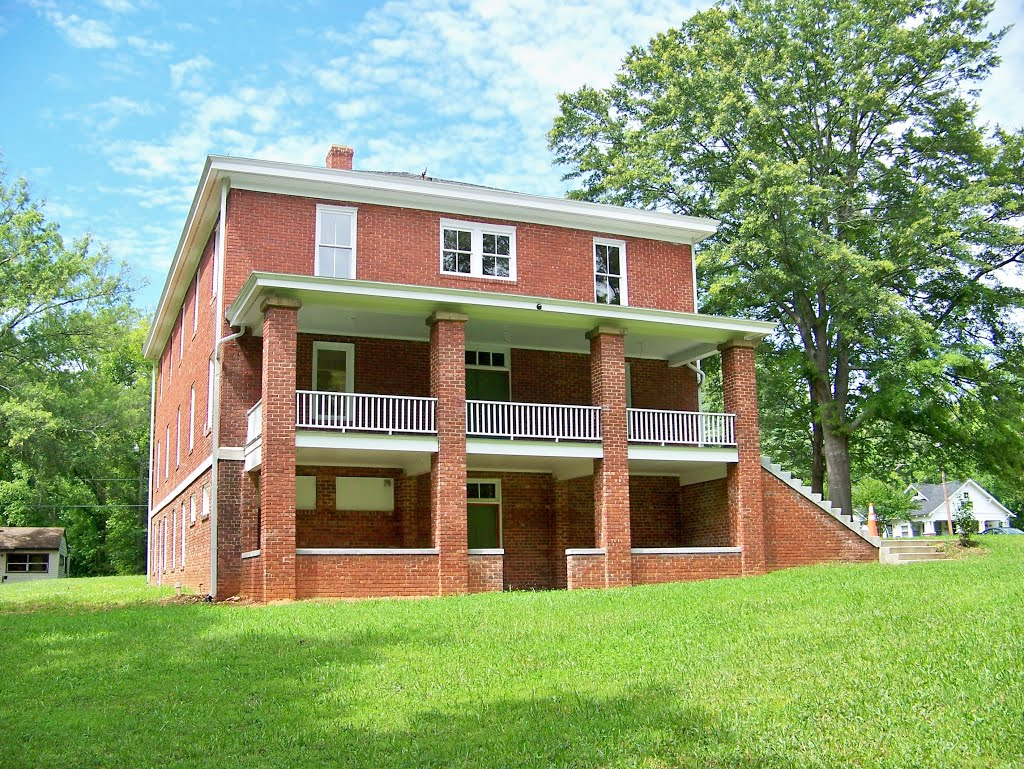
Kumler Hall

The only remaining building from the school's 18 acre campus is Kumler Hall. It is listed on the National Register of Historic Places.

The University of South Carolina Libraries have a collection of photographs related to the school.

It was preceded by Fairfield Institute run by Willard Richardson in Winnsboro, South Carolina.
