= DeVaughn Nixon =

American actor (born 1983)

- Born: July 8, 1983 (age 43); Los Angeles, California, U.S.
- Education: Loyola Marymount University
- Occupation: Actor
- Years active: 1990–present
- Father: Norm Nixon
- Relatives: Vivian Nixon (half-sister); Debbie Allen (stepmother); Phylicia Rashad (aunt); Condola Rashad (cousin)

DeVaughn Walter Nixon (born July 8, 1983) is an American actor. He is known for his roles in The Bodyguard, Terminator 2: Judgment Day, and Sugar Hill, and television series such as Winning Time: The Rise of the Lakers Dynasty, Mackenzie Falls, and Marvel's Runaways.

== Early life and education ==
Nixon was born in Los Angeles in 1983, where he also lived throughout his childhood. He is the son of former basketball player Norm Nixon, whom he portrayed in the HBO series Winning Time: The Rise of the Lakers Dynasty. His stepmother is actress/producer/director/dancer Debbie Allen and half siblings include dancer Vivian Nixon, and basketball player Norman Ellard Nixon Jr. He is married to Lara Nixon. When he was a child, he voiced one of the characters in the animated film Bebe's Kids. Later, he had a role in the film The Bodyguard (playing the son of pop icon Whitney Houston), along with other roles in other films and TV series. However, he temporarily left his film career to devote himself to his studies. He graduated in television production and business finance from Loyola Marymount University.

== Career ==
He returned to his work in film and television after a brief career as a mortgage broker, participating first in the film Monster Heroes. In 2011 he starred in the film Prom. He then appeared in several guest roles in episodic television and television films. In 2017 he was cast in a recurring role in Marvel's Runaways. In 2019, he was cast as his father, Norm Nixon, in the HBO show, Winning Time: The Rise of the Lakers Dynasty.

== Filmography ==
Film roles
Year	Title	Role	Notes
1990	To Sleep with Anger	Sunny	
1991	Terminator 2: Judgment Day	Danny Dyson	
1991	The Rapture	First Boy	
1992	Bebe's Kids	Additional Voices	
1992	The Bodyguard	Fletcher Marron	
1994	Sugar Hill	Raynathan (Age 11)	
2004	Gamebox 1.0	Sherman	
2010	Monster Heroes	Vilante	
2011	Prom	Tyler Barso	
2016	Water Safety	DeVaughn	Short film
2025	Icefall		
2026	Relationship Goals	Ayden	
2026	Pretty Babies		

Television roles
Year	Title	Role	Notes
1991	Civil Wars	Jamie Watson	Episode: "Daveja-Vu All Over Again"
1993	The Fresh Prince of Bel-Air	Shaquille	Episode: "Bundle of Joy"
2001	Lizzie McGuire	Snackbar Attendant	Episode: "Rated Aargh"
2001	One on One	Tracy	Episode: "Radioactive Platonic"
2002	The Hughleys	Derek / Kevin	Episode: "Jump the Jump"
2004	Quintuplets	Player #1	Little Man on Campus
2004	American Dreams	Mark Johnson	Episode: "One in a Million"
2004	Drake & Josh	Band Member	Episode: "Blues Brothers"
2005	JAG	Pvt. Ben Quick	Episode: "Death at the Mosque"
2007	Lincoln Heights	Teen #1	Episode: "Flashpoint"
2007	The Unit	Sgt. Larson	Episode: "Always Kiss Them Goodbye"
2008	The Game	Rookie	Episode: "Bury My Heart at Wounded Knee"
2008	Greek	Pookie	Episode: "Freshman Daze"
2009	MacKenzie Falls	Trevor (Ferguson Michaels)	7 episodes
2010	Sonny with a Chance	Trevor (Ferguson Michaels)	3 episodes
2010–11	The Hard Times of RJ Berger	Hamilton	Recurring
2011–13	The Secret Life of the American Teenager	Omar	Recurring
2012	Kendra	Kenny	2 episodes
2014	Twinzies: Couples Therapy	Theodore	Episode: "Oh Brother"
2017	Love on the Vines	Theo Wyckoff	TV movie
2017	The Haunted	Jordan Terry	TV movie
2017	Groomzilla	Harrison	TV movie
2017–19	Marvel's Runaways	Darius Davis	Recurring
2018	NCIS	Scott Gunderson	Episode: "One Step Forward"
2022–23	Winning Time: The Rise of the Lakers Dynasty	Norm Nixon	Main role
2022–23	Snowfall	Kane	Recurring
2023	The Crossover	Skinny	Guest star
