= Michael Balderrama =

American choreographer

Michael Balderrama (born May 29, 1973) is an American choreographer, Broadway dancer, and producer. He lives in Manhattan, New York, and has had residency there for almost 10 years. Michael has worked with people such as Michael Jackson, Vanessa Williams, and many more. He was born and raised in the state of Texas, but moved to Illinois for his high school years. During high school was when his dance interest peaked. After high school he attended college for one year, but eventually dropped out to live out his dream of dancing. He started off in Los Angeles, and eventually moved to New York to truly let his career take off.

== Early life ==
Michael Anthony Balderrama, who is of Mexican American descent, was born in 1973 at Rockford Memorial Hospital; however, he was raised in a little town about a half-hour outside of San Antonio, Texas, called Hondo. His parents were Maria Balderrama (previously Tejeda), and Ernesto Balderrama. Maria is one of 3 and Ernesto one of 11. Michael has one sister Michelle. She is currently married with one child. Michael grew up in Hondo until the beginning of high school when he moved to Rockford, Illinois. He attended Keith Country Day School on scholarship. After graduating at the top of his class, Michael was offered many scholarships, including academic and volleyball scholarships to many division 1 schools such as Pepperdine University in Malibu, California. Michael however decided to attend Grinnel College on full scholarship.

After one year of college, Michael decided to drop out to continue dancing. He had been dancing since the age of 17 at Forest Hills Dance Academy in Rockford, Illinois. Michael returned to Forest Hills and continued to take lessons and teach there for a few years. Michael was married at the age of 19 for only a few weeks before getting a divorce. At the age of 20, Michael had a daughter, Samantha LeAnn Worzella, with Amy Kathleen Worzella (now Koch). Michael, soon after, left for Los Angeles where his dancing career would truly take off.

== Career ==
His first true dancing job was with Michael Jackson in his extended song "Ghosts". Michael also performed on the VMA's as a back-up dancer for Vanessa Williams in her performance of Colors of the Wind. Once Michael started on Broadway, his first show was the first national tour of Saturday Night Fever in 1999. After being in that for 3 years, the next show he performed in was Movin' Out, a show composed entirely of Billy Joel music. Following Movin' Out, Michael was next seen in Urban Cowboy, which was when the Actor's Union strike occurred. Next was Hot Feet. After Hot Feet, Michael began working on a show off Broadway that would go on to start on Broadway, win 4 Tony awards, and Michael would be a part of for 4 years. This show? In The Heights. (Broadway World). Michael was dance captain, fight captain, and also male swing in In the Heights for 4 years. He worked with people such as Corbin Bleu (from High School Musical) and Jordin Sparks (American Idol season 3 winner). After closing of In the Heights in January 2011, Michael started working on the 2nd National tour of In the Heights and was the official choreographer. In late 2010/early 2011, Michael also began his own production company known as Silver Towers Productions. Michael started working on a new show called VolleyGirls as well as doing miscellaneous choreography jobs in mid-2011. In early 2013, Balderrama co directed and choreographed Children's Musical Theater San Jose's production of "In the Heights." On February 11, 2013, Michael returned to New York and performed in the "In The Heights" one-night-only benefit concert.
