= Condola Rashad =

American actress (born 1986)

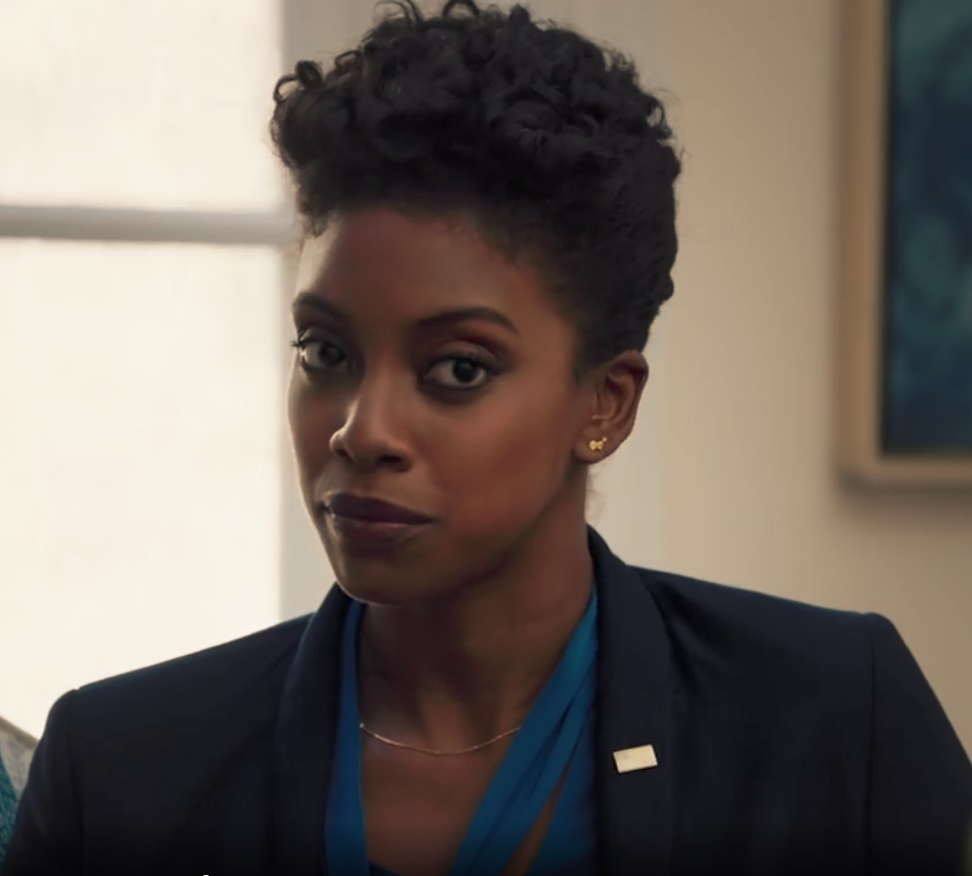
- Rashad in a frame from Billions in 2017
- Born: Condola Phylea Rashad; December 11, 1986 (age 39); New York City, U.S.
- Education: California Institute of the Arts
- Years active: 2008–present
- Parents: Phylicia Rashad; Ahmad Rashad
- Relatives: Debbie Allen (aunt); DeVaughn Nixon (cousin); Vivian Nixon (cousin)

Condola Phylea Rashad (born December 11, 1986), also known professionally as Dola Rashad, is an American actress best known for her work in the theatre. She first broke out with a critically acclaimed performance in Lynn Nottage's off-Broadway play Ruined (2009), which won a Pulitzer Prize.

Rashad has since received four Tony Award nominations for her work on Broadway in the plays Stick Fly, The Trip to Bountiful, A Doll's House, Part 2, and Saint Joan. She is the youngest performer to have received that many nominations. In addition to these roles, she also received praise for playing Juliet in Romeo and Juliet opposite Orlando Bloom on Broadway. She played Kate Sacker on the Showtime drama series Billions. She appeared opposite Chiwetel Ejiofor in Come Sunday (2018). She played Joan of Arc in the 2018 Broadway revival of George Bernard Shaw's play Saint Joan.

== Early life ==
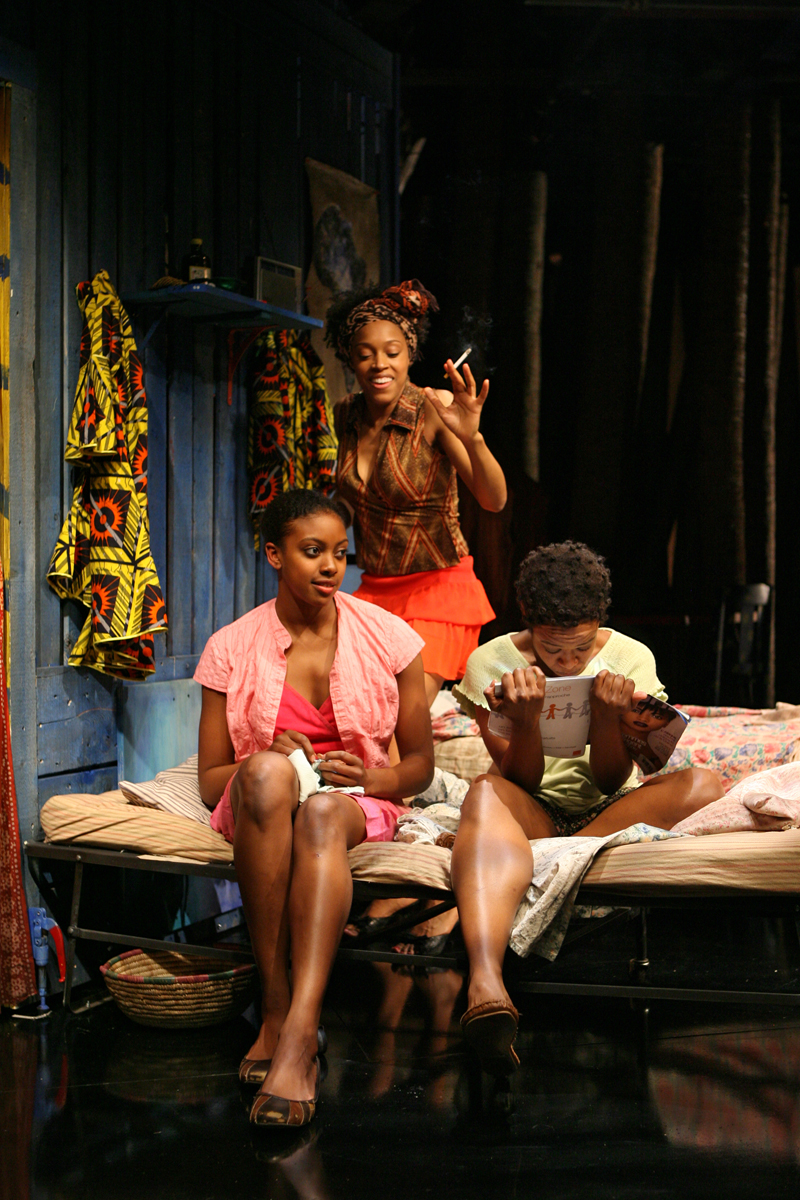
Rashad (seated, left) on opening night of Ruined in 2009

Rashad was born in New York on December 11, 1986, to actress Phylicia Rashad and sportscaster Ahmad Rashad, a former professional football player. She graduated from the California Institute of the Arts in 2008.

== Career ==
In 2009, Rashad received the Theatre World Award for Best Debut Performance in the Off-Broadway production Ruined and was nominated for a Drama Desk Award. In 2012, Rashad was nominated for Tony Award for Best Featured Actress in a Play for her performance in Stick Fly.

Rashad starred as Shelby Shelby Eatenton-Latcherie, the daughter of Queen Latifah's character, in the 2012 Steel Magnolias remake with the same title. (This role had been played by Julia Roberts in the original film.) In 2012, she appeared in a recurring role on the NBC series Smash, and previously guest starred on The Good Wife, Law & Order: Criminal Intent and Submissions Only. Her film credits include Sex and the City 2 and 30 Beats.

In April 2013, she appeared on Broadway as Thelma in the revival of The Trip to Bountiful starring Cicely Tyson; for this performance, she received her second Featured Actress Tony nomination. In May 2013, she was cast as Juliet in the new Broadway production of Shakespeare's Romeo and Juliet.

In 2016, Rashad began starring in the Showtime drama series Billions, and appeared in the film Money Monster directed by Jodie Foster.

In 2018, she starred in the Netflix-produced biographical film Come Sunday, opposite Chiwetel Ejiofor, who played a Pentecostal minister whose thoughts have changed.

== Filmography ==
Year	Title	Role	Notes
2009	The Good Wife	Mary Bennett	TV series (episode: "Unprepared")
2010	Law & Order: Criminal Intent	Khadra	TV series (episodes: "Loyalty: Part 1 and Part 2")
2010	Sex and the City 2	Meghan	
2011	Georgetown	Bryce Johnson	TV film
2012	Smash	Cyn	TV series (3 episodes)
2012	Submissions Only	Eva Halden	TV series (2 episodes)
2012	30 Beats	The Virgin – Julie	
2012	Steel Magnolias	Shelby Eatenton-Latcherie	TV film
2015, 2017	Master of None	Diana	TV series (2 episodes)
2016	Money Monster	Bree (The Assistant)	
2016	Complete Unknown	Sharon	
2016–2023	Billions	Kate Sacker	TV series (60 episodes)
2017	Bikini Moon	Bikini	
2018	Come Sunday	Gina Pearson	
2019	Good Posture	Laura	
2021	The Prince	Meghan Markle (voice)	TV series (12 episodes)

== Stage ==
Year	Title	Role	Venue
2009	Ruined	Sophie	Manhattan Theatre Club, off-Broadway
2011	Stick Fly	Cheryl	Cort Theatre, Broadway
2013	The Trip to Bountiful	Thelma	Stephen Sondheim Theatre, Broadway
2013	Romeo and Juliet	Juliet Capulet	Richard Rodgers Theatre, Broadway
2017	A Doll's House, Part 2	Emmy	John Golden Theatre, Broadway
2018	Saint Joan	Joan of Arc	Samuel J. Friedman Theatre, Broadway

== Awards and nominations ==
- Tony Award
  - 2012: Tony Award for Best Featured Actress in a Play—Stick Fly (Nominated)
  - 2013: Tony Award for Best Featured Actress in a Play—The Trip to Bountiful (Nominated)
  - 2017: Tony Award for Best Featured Actress in a Play—A Doll's House, Part 2 (Nominated)
  - 2018: Tony Award for Best Actress in a Play—Saint Joan (Nominated)
- Theatre World Award
  - 2009: Theatre World Award for Best Debut Performance—Ruined
- Drama Desk Award
  - 2009: Drama Desk Award for Outstanding Featured Actress in a Play—Ruined (Nominated)
  - 2013: Drama Desk Award for Outstanding Featured Actress in a Play—The Trip to Bountiful (Nominated)
- Drama League Award
  - 2009: Drama League Award For Distinguished Performance—Ruined (Nominated)
  - 2013: Drama League Award For Distinguished Performance—Stick Fly (Nominated)
  - 2018: Drama League Award For Distinguished Performance—Saint Joan (Nominated)

=== Achievements ===
Rashad was placed on BET's "Future 40" list, which is a list of "40 of the most inspiring and innovative vanguards who are redefining what it means to be unapologetically young, gifted & black".
