= Dominique Morisseau =

American actor and playwright (born 1978)

- Born: March 13, 1978 (age 48); Detroit, Michigan, U.S.
- Education: University of Michigan, Ann Arbor (BFA)
- Occupations: Playwright, Actor
- Writing career
- Notable awards: Chambers Playwriting Award; NAACP Image Award; Primus Prize for an Emerging Woman Playwright; The Steinberg Playwright Award; Stavis Playwriting Award; Obie Award, 2016; MacArthur Fellowship, 2018; Windham-Campbell Literature Prize, 2023

Dominique Morisseau (born March 13, 1978) is an American playwright and actress from Detroit, Michigan. She has written more than nine plays, three of which are part of a cycle titled The Detroit Project. She received a MacArthur Fellowship (also known as the 'Genius Grant') in 2018.

== Early life ==
Morisseau was born and grew up in Detroit, Michigan, with her mother and father. Her mother's family is from Mississippi and her father's family is from Haiti. Morisseau attended Bates Academy (a selective pre-K through 8 public school in Detroit) and Cass Technical High School. She attended the University of Michigan in Ann Arbor, where she received her BFA in Acting in 2000.

There she met J. Keys, who is also from Michigan. They married in 2013. Keys was born in Detroit but grew up in Southfield, Michigan, a nearby suburb of the city. He works as a music industry promoter, emcee and hip hop musician.

== Career ==
=== Acting ===
Morisseau began her performance career as a live poetry speaker, primarily in her hometown community of Harmonie Park in Detroit. After graduating from college, she continued acting and worked with several organizations. At the Lark Play Development Center, she worked as an actor in a workshop production of The Mountaintop by Katori Hall, developing the role of Camae. In 2013, in a production at the Actors Theatre of Louisville, she reprised the role of Camae. She continues acting but has said that she would not act in any of her plays' premieres.

=== Writing ===
Morisseau began writing plays in college. She has said that the lack of suitable roles at the University of Michigan drove her to write plays and create the roles she wanted to perform. She wrote The Blackness Blues: Time to Change the Tune, A Sister's Story at this time.

After college, in 2012 and 2013, she received a Playwrights of New York (PoNY) fellowship at the Lark Play Development Center. She has also worked as a Teaching Artist with City University of New York's Creative Arts Team.

Morisseau has said that music plays a huge part in her work and often informs the work that she is writing. "It's a resource and clue to my work, and music plays a unifier among cultural barriers."

Morisseau was on the list of Top 20 Most Produced Playwrights in America in 2015–16, with 10 productions of her plays nationwide.

Morisseau was a story editor and co-producer for the television series Shameless on Showtime for seasons 1-7.

She wrote the book for the jukebox musical Ain't Too Proud – The Life and Times of the Temptations, which was originally directed by Des McAnuff. The musical opened on Broadway, marking her Broadway debut as a writer, at the Imperial Theatre in March 2019. It played pre-Broadway engagements at the Berkeley Repertory Theatre (2017), the Ahmanson Theatre in Los Angeles (August to September 2018), and the Kennedy Center (July 2018). She received a nomination for a Tony Award for Best Book of a Musical, the third Black woman to do so.

== Work ==
=== The Detroit Project ===
Morisseau has written a three-play cycle, titled The Detroit Project. The three plays (in order) are:

==== Detroit '67 ====
This play "explores an explosive and decisive moment in a great American city. The play's compelling characters struggle with racial tension and economic instability." It was developed and workshopped at The Public Theater in New York. Detroit '67 eventually was featured at the Classical Theatre of Harlem with the National Black Theatre. It was nominated for eight AUDELCO Theatre Awards and received the 2014 Edward M. Kennedy Prize for Drama Inspired by American History.

==== Paradise Blue ====
Former musician Blue decides to sell his beloved jazz club in order to live out his dreams. He is left with the moral dilemma of leaving his partner, Pumpkin, and his loyal jazz band behind. Morisseau developed this play first at Williamstown Theatre Festival, where it eventually had its world premiere in July 2015. Paradise Blue continued its development at the McCarter Theatre, New York Theatre Workshop, The Public Theater, and the Signature Theatre Company. For this play, Morisseau received the L. Arnold Weissberger Award in 2012.

==== Skeleton Crew ====
The final play in the cycle revolves around a group of auto-plant workers grappling with the likely possibility of foreclosure and impending unemployment. Skeleton Crew received a developmental production at the Lark Play Development Center. Directed by Ruben Santiago-Hudson, this play had its world premiere at the Off-Broadway Linda Gross Theater with the Atlantic Theater Company in May 2016.

Morisseau won the 2016 Obie Award Special Citation for Collaboration, along with director Santiago-Hudson and the Atlantic Theater Company for Skeleton Crew. The play won the Edgerton Foundation New Play Award in 2015. Skeleton Crew opened on Broadway in January 2022. It was nominated for the Tony Award for Best Play.

== Works ==
Play	Year Premiered	Length	Notes
Follow Me To Nellie's	2011		Follow me to Nellie's premiered at Premiere Stages, Kean University Zella Fry Theatre in North New Jersey in July 2011 under the direction of John Wooten.
Detroit '67	2013	120 Minutes	Detroit '67 was first presented Off Broadway at the Public Theater in association with Classical Theatre of Harlem and the National Black Theatre in New York City on March 11, 2013. It was directed by Kwame Kwei-Armah.
Sunset Baby	2013	90 Minutes	Sunset Baby premiered at the LAByrinth Theatre Company on November 6, 2013 under the direction of Kamilah Forbes.
Night Vision	2013	10 Minutes	Night Vision was originally commissioned for Facing Our Truth: Ten Minute Plays On Trayvon, Race And Privilege and produced by The New Black Fest, Keith Josef Adkins, Artistic Director. The original reading took place at the Martin Segal Theater at CUNY Graduate Center, NYC December 5, 2013. An audio version of the play was released by Playing on Air in spring 2020, featuring April Matthis and Eden Marryshow, directed by Stori Ayers.
Blood At The Root	2014	105 Minutes	Blood at the Root premiered at the Penn State School of Theater in March 2014 under the direction of Steve Broadnax III.
Paradise Blue	2015	120 Minutes	Paradise Blue premiered at the Williamstown Theatre Festival in Williamstown, MA in July 2015 under the direction of Ruben Santiago-Hudson.
Skeleton Crew	2016	120 Minutes	Skeleton Crew premiered at the Atlantic Theatre Company in New York City in January 2016 under the direction of Ruben Santiago-Hudson.
Pipeline	2017	90 Minutes	Pipeline premiered at the Lincoln Center Theatre in New York City in June 2017 under the direction of Lileana Blain-Cruz. Won the Edgerton Foundation New Play Award in 2016.
Mud Row	2019		People's Light & Theatre will present the premiere of Mud Row in June 2019 under the direction of Steve H. Broadnax III.
Confederates	2022		Commissioned by the Oregon Shakespeare Festival and Penumbra Theater, it premiered in New York at the Signature Theatre Company.
Jazelle the Gazelle	unknown	10 Minutes	Jezelle the Gazelle was recorded live for Playing on Air Live Benefit in November 2019 with Mirirai Sithole in the title role under the direction of Goldie E. Patrick.
Third Grade	unknown	10 Minutes	
Mix and Master	2027	TBA	Mix and Master is set to debut on Broadway in 2027 starring Kara Young and Ruben Santiago-Hudson at the Todd Haimes Theatre.

== Awards ==
Morisseau received a MacArthur Fellowship (also known as the 'Genius Grant') fin 2018, which included a stipend of $625,000. She is one of 25 fellows in the 2018 Class.

Morisseau was named an Honoree for the Jane Chambers Playwriting Award, which recognizes plays and performance texts created by women that present a feminist perspective and contain significant opportunities for female performers.

She is a two-time award winner of the NAACP Image Award, which celebrates the outstanding achievements and performances of people of color in the arts, as well as those individuals or groups who promote social justice through their creative endeavors.

- Primus Prize by the American Theatre Critics Association (honoree) for Follow Me to Nellie's in 2012
- Stavis Playwriting Award
- University of Michigan: Emerging Leader Award
- City of Detroit: Spirit of Detroit Award
- Morisseau, along with Ruben Santiago-Hudson, received the Apple Award from the Department of Theatre and Dance at Wayne State University in 2022 for Outsdanding Contributions to Theatre in the USA. The Apple Award was endowed by the Nederlander Family in memory of Sarah Applebaum Nederlander.
- Edward M. Kennedy Prize for Drama, 2014, for her play Detroit '67
- Steinberg Playwright Award, 2015
- OBIE Award for "Special Citation: Collaboration" for her and Ruben Santiago-Hudson (director) for Skeleton Crew at Atlantic Theater Company, 2016
- Windham Campbell Literature Prize for drama, 2023.
