= Christmas on the Square =

2020 American Christmas musical film

- Film poster
- Directed by: Debbie Allen
- Screenplay by: Maria S. Schlatter
- Starring: Dolly Parton; Jenifer Lewis; Josh Segarra; Jeanine Mason; Mary Lane Haskell; Treat Williams; Christine Baranski
- Cinematography: Oliver Bokelberg
- Edited by: Casey O. Rohrs
- Music by: Dolly Parton
- Production companies: Warner Bros. Television; Magnolia Hill Productions
- Distributed by: Netflix
- Release date: November 22, 2020
- Running time: 98 minutes
- Country: United States
- Language: English

Dolly Parton's Christmas on the Square is a 2020 American Christmas-themed musical film directed and choreographed by Debbie Allen. Starring Dolly Parton (making her final film appearance in her lifetime prior to her death in 2026), Christine Baranski, Jenifer Lewis, and Treat Williams, the plot follows the wealthy Regina Fuller (Baranski), returning to her hometown to evict the residents and sell the land to a mall developer. Netflix released the film on November 22, 2020. At the 73rd Primetime Emmy Awards, Christmas on the Square won the award for Outstanding Television Movie.

== Plot ==
In a small town, Regina is ready to evict everyone on Christmas Eve to make way for a mega-mall. Dolly Parton is tasked as the angel to help change her mind and help change the lives of everyone who lives there.

== Cast ==
- Dolly Parton as Angel
- Jenifer Lewis as Margeline
  - Lariah Alexandria as Young Margeline
- Josh Segarra as Pastor Christian Hathaway
- Jeanine Mason as Felicity Sorenson
- Mary Lane Haskell as Jenna Hathaway
- Treat Williams as Carl Pellam
  - Andrew Brodeur as Teenage Carl Pellam
- Christine Baranski as Regina Fuller
- Matthew Johnson as Mack
- Selah Kimbro Jones as Violet
- Douglas Sills as Jack Fuller
- Vivian Nixen as Bessie
- Braxton Alexander as Kenny
- Yvonne Valadez as Dr. Martinez
- Kim Hale as Pie Lady
- Mary Donnelly-Haskell as Lenore
- Stephen Caudill as Dr. Lundquist
- Donald Corren as Dr. Marshall
- Jacob Moran as Gilbert
- Carol Swarbrick as Granny Hoover
- Stacy Ann Rose as Rose
- Brandon O'Neal as Andy
- Mark Daniel Chmiel as Phil the Mailman
- Brandon Hudson as Randy

== Production ==
The film was shot in Atlanta, Georgia in the summer of 2019.

== Songs ==
Parton wrote all of the songs featured in the film. A soundtrack album was not released, although Parton did record versions of "Christmas Is" and "Christmas on the Square" for her 2020 album A Holly Dolly Christmas. "Try" was originally featured on Parton's 2014 album Blue Smoke.

1. "Main Title" – Orchestra
2. "Christmas Is / Christmas on the Square / Gotta Get Out / Maybe, Just Maybe / So Sorry" – Dolly Parton, Christine Baranski, Josh Segarra, Mary Lane Haskell, Jeanine Mason, and Ensemble
3. "You" – Josh Segarra and Mary Lane Haskell
4. "Queen of Mean" – Jenifer Lewis and Christine Baranski
5. "Keeper of Memories" – Treat Williams
6. "Everybody Needs an Angel" – Dolly Parton
7. "Light Your Lamp" – Dolly Parton
8. "Wickedest Witch of the Middle" – Josh Segarra, Mary Lane Haskell, Jenifer Lewis, Treat Williams, Matthew Johnson, and Ensemble
9. "Try" – Josh Segarra, Mary Lane Haskell, Jenifer Lewis, Treat Williams, Matthew Johnson, and Ensemble
10. "Fairytale" – Selah Kimbro Jones & Christine Baranski
11. "Maybe, Just Maybe" (Reprise 1) – Christine Baranski
12. "A Father's Prayer" – Douglas Sills
13. "Everybody Needs an Angel" (Reprise) – Dolly Parton and Jeanine Mason
14. "Rearview Mirror / Happy Town / Just Dance" – Dolly Parton, Christine Baranski, and Ensemble
15. "Maybe, Just Maybe" (Reprise 2) – Christine Baranski
16. "A Father's Prayer" (Reprise) – Matthew Johnson
17. "Christmas Is" (Reprise) – Jeanine Mason
18. "Try" (Reprise) – Mary Lane Haskell
19. "Angels Know" – Dolly Parton & Mary Lane Haskell
20. "Maybe, Just Maybe" (Reprise 3) – Christine Baranski
21. "Try" (Gospel Reprise) – Jenifer Lewis and Ensemble
22. "An Angel's Prayer" – Dolly Parton
23. "Forgive Me" – Christine Baranski
24. "Christmas Is / Christmas on the Square" (Finale) – Cast
25. "Try" (End Credits) – Dolly Parton

== Reception ==
On review aggregator Rotten Tomatoes, the film holds an approval rating of 63% based on 35 critic reviews, with an average rating of 5.7/10. The website's critics' consensus reads, "Dolly Parton's Christmas on the Square isn't quite up to its star's standards, but its overwhelming good cheer and campy self-awareness may be just what viewers are looking for." On Metacritic, it has a weighted average score of 51 out of 100 based on 7 critics, indicating "mixed or average" reviews.

Caroline Framke of Variety praised the film's musical boost from vocalists Jeanine Mason and Jenifer Lewis, stating, "Even when Parton’s songs start to blend together, they get a boost from the likes of Jeanine Mason and Jenifer Lewis belting them," while also criticizing the script as "sickly sweet and, in a 20 minute stretch of critical twists and turns, genuinely bizarre." Wesley Morris of The New York Times noted that the film's songs blend "wit, wisdom and attitude" but they lack memorable hooks, while praising Debbie Allen's direction for its "overcaffeinated yet effective" energy, though faulting the plot for being too overstretched with multiple crises which are abruptly resolved.

== Accolades ==
Year	Award	Category	Nominee(s)	Result	Ref.
2021	Dorian Awards	Campiest TV Show	Christmas on the Square	Nominated	
2021	Golden Reel Awards	Outstanding Achievement in Sound Editing – Sound Effects, Foley, Music, Dialogue and ADR for Non-Theatrical Feature Film Broadcast Media	Trip Brock, Jacob Ortiz, Marc S. Perlman, Michael T. Ryan, Raymond Park, Jackie Johnson, Bruce Stubblefield, Michael Farrow and Tom Ruttledge	Nominated	
2021	Primetime Emmy Awards	Outstanding Television Movie	Dolly Parton, Maria S. Schlatter, Debbie Allen, Sam Haskell, Joe Lazarov and Hudson Hickman	Won	
2021	Primetime Emmy Awards	Outstanding Choreography for Scripted Programming	Debbie Allen	Won	
2021	Producers Guild of America Awards	Outstanding Producer of Streamed or Televised Motion Pictures	Dolly Parton and Sam Haskell	Nominated	

== See also ==
- List of Christmas films
- List of films about angels
