= The Lark (theater) =

Non-profit organisation in Manhattan, New York, USA

The Lark, formerly Lark Play Development Center, was a non-profit organization, headquartered in Manhattan, New York that sought to help discover and develop playwrights. It announced its closing in October, 2021.

== History ==
The Lark was founded in 1994 by John Clinton Eisner with the stated mission of "discover(ing) and develop(ing) new voices for the American theater." Originally, they produced plays but in 1997 the company stopped producing classic works or touring in schools, focusing instead on supporting playwrights as they develop their works. By 2002 they were working with around 100 playwrights on 300 readings each year.

Playwrights' Week was one of The Lark's longest running programs, a festival of five playwrights work chosen via open-submissions. The company also ran many international exchange programs translating work and bringing in playwrights from Russia, Mexico, Romania and The Middle East. As part of this work it also brought the work of American Playwrights abroad.

The Lark offered many fellowships to playwrights including The Pony Fellowship, offered between 2007 and 2016 which gave one playwright each year a free New York apartment, a substantial cash stipend and the chance to participate in The Lark's Playwrights Workshop.

The company moved to a new space in 2011. In 2020, Stacy Waring was named Executive Director of The Lark. Artistic Director John Clinton Eisner retired in 2020 and May Adrales was appointed Artistic Director. Marcela Davison Aviles served as Interim Executive Director from July 2021 until The Lark's closure.

The Lark announced its closing on October 5, 2021: “ After many months of responding to pandemic-related crises and seeking paths to sustainability, The Board of Directors, in a unanimous vote, have come to the painful conclusion that there is no sustainable and viable path forward for The Lark as an organization. We have commenced an orderly wind-down, and are in conversation with peer institutions to re-home existing Lark programs and fellowships.”

In 2022, American Theatre Magazine released a feature article entitled "What Happened at The Lark?", which chronicled the events leading up to the organization's dissolution.

== Achievements ==
The Lark received an Obie Award and a Lucille Lortel Award for Outstanding Body of Work. The Lark's blog received the Aristos Award.

Over 100 plays developed by the Lark Play Development Center went on to 122 presentations around the world.

The Lark was often credited for the work it did in developing plays. When Playwright Rajiv Joseph's Benjal Tiger at the Baghdad Zoo was produced on Broadway he credited the Lark saying "This play would never have come together if it weren’t for the Lark Play Development Center in New York City. The opportunities provided by the program truly encouraged me to continue writing."
