= Landi =

Landi may refer to:

== People ==
- Landi family
- Doria-Pamphili-Landi, a noble family from Genoa, Italy

=== Surname ===
- Neroccio di Bartolomeo de' Landi (1447–1500), Italian artist
- Maria Landi (15??–1599), consort of Ercole Grimaldi, Lord of Monaco
- Maria Teresa Landi, Italian epidemiologist and oncologist
- Lorenzo Landi (1567–1627), Bishop of Fossombrone
- Benedetto Landi (1578–1638), Bishop of Fossombrone
- Marco Landi (died 1593), Bishop of Ascoli Satriano
- Stefano Landi (1587–1639), Italian Baroque composer
- Lelio Landi (died 1610), Bishop of Nardò
- Francesco Landi (1682–1757), cardinal
- Giuseppe Antonio Landi (1713–1791), Italian architect and painter
- Antonio Landi (1725–1783), Italian poet, writer and playwright
- Gaspare Landi (1756–1830), Italian artist
- Aristodemo Landi (active after 1880), Italian painter
- Lamberto Landi (1882–1950), Italian composer and conductor
- Bruno Landi (tenor) (1900–1968), tenor
- Bruno Landi (cyclist) (1928–2005), Italian racing cyclist
- Elissa Landi (1904–1948), Italian actress
- Chico Landi (1907–1989), Brazilian race-car driver
- Marcello Landi (1916–1993), Italian painter and poet
- Mario Landi (1920–1992), Italian actor
- Aldo Bufi Landi (1923–2016), Italian actor
- Lilia Landi (1929–2019), Italian film actress
- Gino Landi (1933–2023), Italian choreographer and director
- Roberto Landi (born 1956), Italian footballer
- Frédéric Luca Landi (born 1973), French fashion designer, photographer and editor
- Laurent Landi (born 1977), French-American artistic gymnastics coach
- Cecile Canqueteau-Landi (born 1979), French artistic gymnast and coach
- Alex Landi, American actor
- Andrea Justine Landi (born 1988), American volleyball player
- Evan Landi (born 1990), American football player
- Paolo Emilio Landi, Italian theatre director, journalist, and documentarian
- Ali Landi (2006–2021), Iranian hero
- Juliette Landi (born 2007), French-American diver

=== Given name ===
- Landi Swanepoel, South African model

== Places ==
=== Iran ===
- Landi, Iran, a village

=== Pakistan ===
- Havid Landi Dak, a town in Bannu District, Khyber Pakhtunkhwa
- Landi Kotal, the highest point on the Khyber Pass
- Landi Arbab, a village in Peshawar District, Khyber Pakhtunkhwa

=== Italy ===
- Caselle Landi, a municipality (comune) in the province of Lodi, Lombardia
- Landi State, a valley of the Taro river, a tributary of the Po

== Other uses ==
- Landi, an agricultural cooperatives in Switzerland, part of Fenaco
- Landi Renzo, an Italian company
- 2381 Landi, an asteroid
- Calophyllum brasiliense, a tropical tree colloquially known as Landi
- Landi (typeface), a foundry type made by Ludwig & Mayer

== See also ==
- Lando (disambiguation)
- Pope Lando: Lando or Landus (in Latin), the last pope to use his own surname
- Lahndi (disambiguation)
- Landy (disambiguation)
