= Lando =

Lando or Landó may refer to:

== People and fictional characters ==
- Lando (name), a given name of Italian origin, nickname and surname
  - Pope Lando (913–914)

== Other uses ==
- List of storms named Lando, several tropical cyclones
- Landó (music), a form of Afro-Peruvian music
- Lando, South Carolina, United States, an unincorporated community
  - Lando School, on the National Register of Historic Places
- Lando (horse), a German racehorse that won the 1995 Japan Cup

== See also ==
- Herbert v. Lando (1979), U.S. Supreme Court case involving Anthony Herbert and Barry Lando
- Chez Lando, a restaurant in the Rwandan capital, Kigali
- Lando, an open source software development tool.
- Lando Platform railway station, which served the village of Pembrey, Carmarthenshire, Wales, from 1915 to 1964
- Landos, a commune in France
- Landau, a town in Germany
- Landi (disambiguation)
- Londo (disambiguation)
