= Lando (name) =

Lando is both a masculine Italian given name, a nickname and a surname. Lando or Landó may refer to:

== Given name ==
- Pope Lando, Roman Catholic Pope from 913 to 914
- Lando (bishop of Reims), from 645 to 649
- Lando (archbishop of Messina) (died 1248 or 1249)
- Lando I of Capua (died 861), Count of Capua from 843 to 861
- Lando II of Capua, Count of Capua for in 861
- Lando III of Capua (died 885), Count of Capua from 882 to 885
- Lando IV of Capua, Prince of Capua from 1091 to 1098
- Lando Bartolini (1937–2024), Italian tenor
- Lando Buzzanca (1935–2022), Italian actor
- Lando Conti (1933–1986), Italian politician
- Lando Ferretti (1895–1977), Italian journalist and politician
- Lando Fiorini (1938–2017), Italian actor and singer
- Lando Norris (born 1999), British racing driver
- Lando Vannata (born 1992), American mixed martial artist

== Surname ==
- Barry Lando (born 1939), Canadian journalist
- Bibi Landó (born 1967), Paraguayan actress, businesswoman and television and radio host
- Carlos Landó, Argentine tennis player in the early 1980s
- Dov Lando (born 1930), Israeli rabbi
- Enrico Lando (born 1966), Italian film director and screenwriter
- Joe Lando (born 1961), American actor
- Maxim Lando (born 2002), American pianist
- Michele di Lando, first leader of the Ciompi Revolt in Florence that started in 1378
- Ortensio Lando (c. 1510–c. 1558), Italian writer of satires and translations
- Peter Lando (fl. 1989–present), set decorator
- Pietro Lando (1462–1545), Doge of Venice from 1538 to 1545
- Teta Lando (1948–2008), Angolan musician

== Nickname ==
- Gerlando Lando Buzzanca (1935–2022), Italian actor
- Leopoldo Lando Fiorini (1938–2017), Italian actor and singer
- Gabriel Landeskog (born 1992), Swedish ice hockey player sometimes nicknamed Lando
- Landoald Lando Ndasingwa (died 1994), Rwandan politician and businessman

== Fictional characters ==
- Landonis Lando Calrissian, a Star Wars character
- Mathilda Lando, in the 1994 film Léon: The Professional
