= Landy =

Landy may refer to:

== People ==
- Landy (born 1997), French rapper

=== Surname ===
- Alvin Landy (1905–1967), American bridge administrator and player; inventor of the Landy convention
- Derek Landy (born 1974), Irish author and screenwriter
- Eugene Landy (1934–2006), American psychologist and therapist
- John Landy (1930–2022), Australian former track athlete and politician; namesake of Landy Field
- Michael Landy (born 1963), British visual artist
- Sandra Landy (1938–2017), British world champion contract bridge player

=== Given name ===
- Landy Berzunza Novelo (born 1965), Mexican politician
- Landy Mattison (born 1983), American soccer defender
- Landy Mertz (born 2000), American soccer player
- Landy Párraga (2001–2024), Ecuadorian model and beauty pageant contestant
- Landy Scott (1919–2014), American midget car racing champion
- Landy Wen (born 1979), Taiwanese pop singer

== Other uses ==
- Landy convention, a contract bridge convention
- Landy Field, an athletics field in South Geelong, Victoria, Australia
- Suzuki Landy, a Japanese minivan

== See also ==
- Landi (disambiguation)
