= Little Athletics =

Children's sports program in Australia

- Little Athletics logo
- Date: October to March
- Location: Australia
- Event type: Junior athletics
- Primary sponsor: Coles
- Established: 1964
- Website: littleathletics.com.au

Little Athletics is an Australian activity program that involves modified athletics events for children aged 3 to 16 in the Australian Capital Territory, New South Wales, Queensland, South Australia, Western Australia 3 to 15 in Victoria; and 3 to 14 in Tasmania. According to Little Athletics' 2021–2022 annual report regarding the 2021–2022 financial year, it was estimated that more than 150,000 kids participated in the program for that financial year.

== History ==
The competitions were founded by Trevor Billingham, a young Australian athletics enthusiast from Geelong, Victoria, in 1964. By 1967, there were more than 35 Little Athletics clubs in Victoria, and the decision was made to start the Victorian Little Athletics Association (VLAA).

Soon after the formation of the VLAA, other states expressed interest in Little Athletics. In February 1968, a year after the formation of the VLAA, Western Australia held its first Little Athletics meet at Perry Lakes Stadium. In 1972, the states of Victoria, New South Wales, Northern Territory and Western Australia became the founding members of The Australian Little Athletics Union (ALAU), which was formed in Perth. By 1974, Tasmania, Australian Capital Territory, South Australia and Queensland had all joined the ALAU.

== Events ==
Available Little Athletics events vary between age groups and from state to state. The following represents the range of events available.

Event	Vic	NSW	Qld	SA	WA	Tas	ACT
50 m	Yes	Yes	No	No	No	No	Yes
70 m	Yes	Yes	Yes	Yes	Yes	Yes	Yes
100 m	Yes	Yes	Yes	Yes	Yes	Yes	Yes
150 m (younger competitors)	No	No	No	No	No	Yes	No
200 m	Yes	Yes	Yes	Yes	Yes	Yes	Yes
Sprint hurdles (distance depends on age)	Yes	Yes	Yes	Yes	Yes	Yes	Yes
200 m hurdles (older competitors)	No	Yes	Yes	Yes	Yes	Yes	Yes
300 m hurdles (older competitors)	Yes	Yes	Yes	No	Yes	No	No
400 m (7 years and older)	Yes	Yes	Yes	Yes	Yes	Yes	Yes
800 m (older competitors)	Yes	Yes	Yes	Yes	Yes	Yes	Yes
1500 m (older competitors)	Yes	Yes	Yes	Yes	Yes	Yes	Yes
Race walk (distance depends on age)	Yes	Yes	Yes	Yes	Yes	Yes	Yes
4 × 100 m relay	Yes	Yes	Yes	Yes	Yes	Yes	Yes
4 × 200 m relay (older competitors)	Yes	Yes	Yes	Yes	Yes	Yes	No
4 × 400 m relay (older competitors)	No	Yes	No	No	Yes	No	Yes
Medley relay (100 m, 100 m, 200 m and 400 m)	Yes	Yes	Yes	Yes	No	No	Yes
Swedish relay (100 m, 200 m, 300 m and 400 m)	No	No	No	No	No	Yes	No
Road relay (distance depends on age)	Yes	No	No	No	No	No	No
Shot put	Yes	Yes	Yes	Yes	Yes	Yes	Yes
Discus	Yes	Yes	Yes	Yes	Yes	Yes	Yes
Javelin (older competitors)	Yes	Yes	Yes	Yes	Yes	Yes	Yes
Turbo javelin (younger competitors)	No	No	No	No	Yes	Yes	No
Long jump	Yes	Yes	Yes	Yes	Yes	Yes	Yes
Triple jump	Yes	Yes	Yes	Yes	Yes	Yes	Yes
High jump (older competitors)	Yes	Yes	Yes	Yes	Yes	Yes	Yes
Multi-event (100 m, sprint hurdles, 800 m, long jump and discus)	Yes	Yes	Yes	Yes	Yes	Yes	Yes
Cross-country (distance depends on age)	Yes	Yes	No	Yes	Yes	Yes	No

== Structure and governance ==
Under the independent governing body, Little Athletics Australia (LAA), each state and territory has its own association which is responsible for running Little Athletics in that state. Each state body controls the relevant centres and events in their state or territory. Clubs are the base level of the Little Athletics structure. Centres might house just one Little Athletics club or a number of clubs, with each club informing their own members of upcoming events. Training areas and facilities might be shared or separate.

== History ==
In October 1963, three young boys turned up at a senior athletics meet in Geelong, Victoria. They approached official Trevor Billingham, but Billingham turned them away citing their youth as a reason for them not to be allowed to compete. A few months later, Billingham held a coaching camp for secondary school students. His camp had a lot of primary school students in attendance.

Billingham decided to set up a Saturday competition for younger children. The first competition was on 3 October 1964, in Geelong. Billingham had advertised the event in the Geelong Advertiser by saying:

"Also starting this Saturday, will be the special morning meeting for boys and girls. These will commence at 10:30 a.m. each Saturday and will be open to any school age competitor. It is intended that boys and girls not old enough to compete in the afternoon will take part in these special meetings. Anyone interested in the sport may attend, including parents, while the one-hour of athletics is conducted. All of the standard athletic events will be conducted and boys and girls will be graded in each event."

After the event, he wrote a one-page article titled "Junior Athletics in Wet Conditions", which appeared in the Geelong Advertiser on 5 October 1964. He wrote that more than 80 boys and girls attended. He also wrote that there was a considerable need for such junior athletic competitions at the time, that the event was a success, and more events of the same type were to be held in the future.

By 1965, Billingham had still not convinced the Geelong branch of the Victorian Amateur Athletics Association (VAAA). In January 1965, Billingham acquired lights for the Geelong senior athletics oval, Landy Field, which was also where the Little Athletics competition were. The lights were originally erected at Kardinia Park for the 1956 Olympics; Billingham asked the Geelong Football Club if he could use the lights, and they allowed him. Billingham invited Ron Clarke to the now-lighted Landy Field to break the 20,000 meters and one-hour run world records, and Clarke accepted. In January 1965, Billingham also thought up the name "Little Athletics"; previously, the events had been called "Junior Athletics". He took his two proposals to the VAAA, and both were accepted.

On 9 October 1965, the 1965/66 Geelong Little Athletics season started. Fourteen meets were held, with a fee of three shillings for the season.

Billingham was the sole preparer for the Ron Clarke visit. When Clarke came, he broke both world records and brought fame to the Geelong Centre of the VAAA at Landy Field.

Despite his success with Clarke, Billingham still could not get support for Little Athletics from VAAA; instead, they suggested he drop the junior competition and focus on the rapidly expanding senior one. One of the delegates, Jack Frewin, encouraged him to push through with his idea, so he published a notice in the Geelong Advertiser announcing that he needed to start a formation of Little Athletics clubs. There was a meeting of interested parents, and Billingham told them that he thought an organisation should be set up based on his experience from the seniors competitions but he need some parents to help him. On 27 November 1965, six clubs were formed. They were run by parents with Billingham as an overall manager. By the end of the 1965/66 season, more than 200 boys and girls were competing regularly across nine clubs, and more than 500 had tried out at least once. The first Geelong championships were held in March 1966 over the long weekend.

There was another meeting in March 1966. John McGlynn, an executive from the Ford Motor Company, suggested that there was a need to encourage other clubs from areas outside Geelong to start up. By September 1966, there were clubs in Geelong, Belmont, Newtown, Lara, Corio YMCA and St Thomas. They were all based around local high schools.

In May 1967, the Victorian Little Athletics Association (VLAA) was formed. By 1969, there were 39 clubs in the VLAA. The first Western Australian meet was in February 1968 at Perry Lakes Stadium. In March 1968, a Western Australian association was formed. Competitions in New South Wales started in October 1968. In 1972, the Australian Little Athletics Union (ALAU) was formed in Perth. Victoria, New South Wales, Northern Territory and Western Australia were the founding members. Tasmania, South Australia, Australian Capital Territory and Queensland joined shortly afterwards.

== Current ==
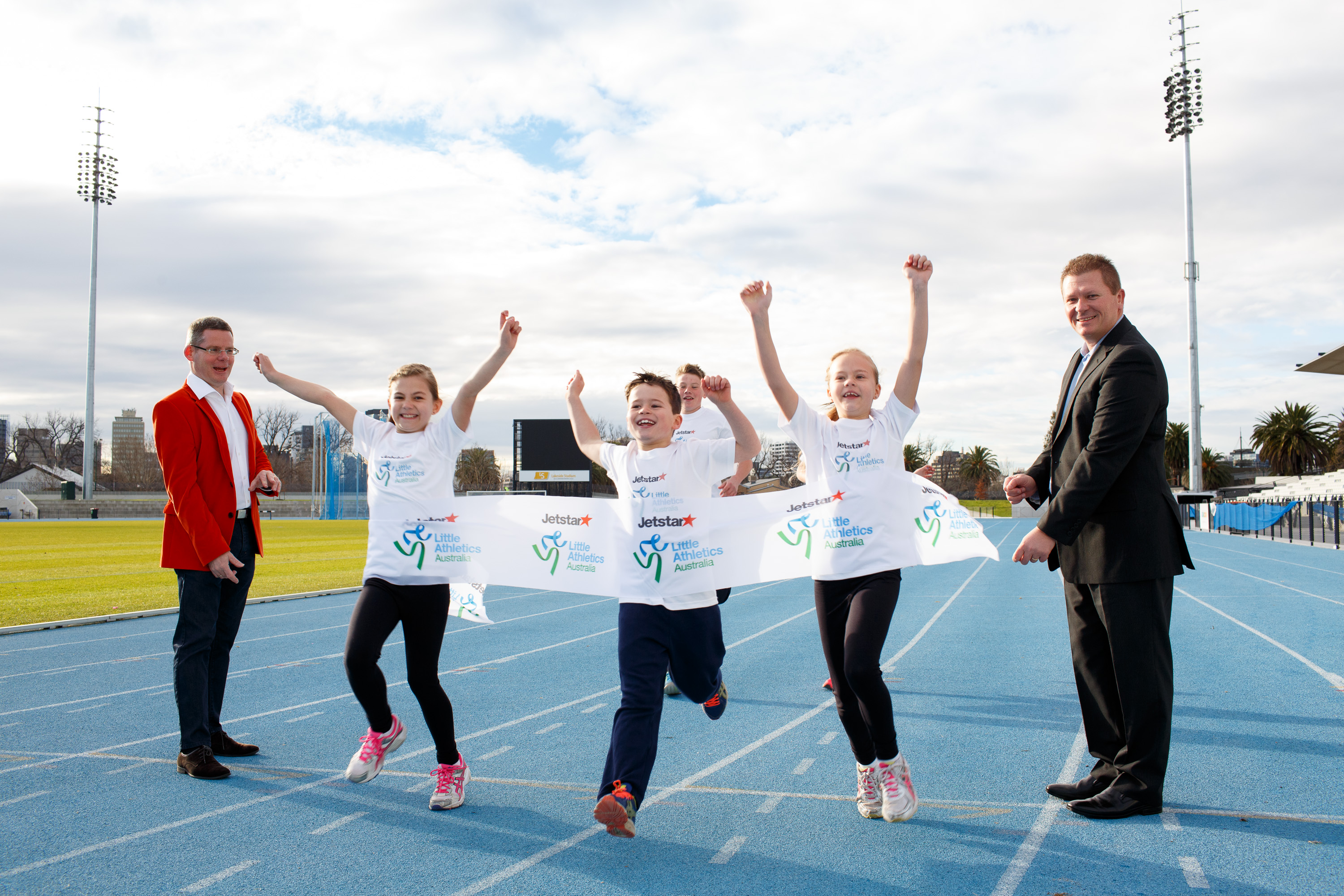
In July 2014, Jetstar became the first naming partner of Little Athletics Australia with a two-year sponsorship deal.

In the 2013/14 season, Little Athletics had more than 100,000 athletes and approximately 500 centres. Every year, there is a national championship for athletes under 13 years old, in which each state has a team of its best athletes.

In July 2014, Jetstar announced a two-year sponsorship deal with Little Athletics Australia (LAA), which saw the Australian airline becoming the first naming partner of LAA. In September 2017, Coles signed with Little Athletics Australia, becoming its major partner.

== Notable athletes ==
- Christoper Anderson (born 1968), Olympic high jumper; World Championships high jumper
- David Anderson (born 1965), Olympic high jumper
- Nagmeldin Bol (born 1994), Commonwealth Games middle-distance runner; Olympic middle-distance runner
- Vanessa Browne (born 1963), Olympic high jumper
- Martin Cattalini (born 1973), professional basketball player, National Basketball League
- Benjamin Cureton (born 1981), Olympic rower; World Rowing Champion
- Oliver Dziubak (born 1982), Commonwealth Games javelin thrower; Olympic javelin thrower
- Michelle Hager (born 1966), Olympic field hockey player
- Sally Hamilton-Fleming (born 1961), Olympic hurdler
- Sarah Jamieson (born 1975), Australian National Champion middle-distance runner; Commonwealth Games middle-distance runner; Olympic middle-distance runner
- Jodi Lambert (born 1970), Olympic sprinter
- Rodney Mapstone (born 1969), Olympic sprinter
- Paul Mardle (born 1962), Olympic discus thrower
- Fredereick Martin (born 1966), Olympic sprinter
- Kobie McGurk (born 1985), Olympic field hockey player
- Kimberley Mickle (born 1984), Australian National Champion javelin thrower; Commonwealth Games javelin thrower; World Championship javelin thrower
- Jemima Montag (born 1998), Olympic racewalker
- Shaun Murphy (born 1970), Australian National Soccer Team; Olympic soccer player
- Benjamin Offereins (born 1986), Australian National Champion sprinter; Commonwealth Games sprinter; World Championships sprinter
- Jacqueline Pereira (born 1964), Olympic field hockey striker
- Lauren Poetschka (born 1974), Olympic track and field hurdler
- Renee Poetschka (born 1971), Australian National Champion track and field hurdler; Olympic sprinter
- Kylie Reed (born 1974), Australian National Champion long jumper; Olympic bobsledder
- Christine Stanton (born 1959), Olympic high jumper
- Shane Tonkin (born 1971), Olympic baseball pitcher
- Kylie Wheeler (born 1980), Olympic heptathlete
