= Mattinson =

Mattinson is a surname. Notable people with the surname include:

- Burny Mattinson (born 1935), American storyboarder for Walt Disney Animation Studios
- Campbell Mattinson (born 1968), Australian editor, writer and critic
- Gerald Mattinson (born 1958), American basketball coach
- Miles Walker Mattinson KC (1854–1944), English barrister, Conservative MP
- William Mattinson (1836–1911), politician in South Australia

== See also ==
- Mattison
