= Landini (surname) =

Landini is an Italian surname that may refer to

- Adelmo Landini (1896–1965), Italian inventor, pupil and assistant of Guglielmo Marconi
- Agnese Landini (born 1976), Italian teacher, wife of former Prime Minister Matteo Renzi
- Maurizio Landini (born 1961), Italian trade unionist
- Andrea Landini (1847–1935), Italian painter
- Claude Landini, Swiss basketball player
- Fausto Landini (born 1951), Italian football coach and player
- Francesco Landini (c.1325/1335–1397), Italian composer, organist, singer, poet and instrument maker
- Maria Landini (c.1668–1722), Italian soprano
- Massimiliana Landini Aleotti (born 1942/43), Italian billionaire heiress
- Raúl Landini (1909–1988), Argentine boxer
- Spartaco Landini (1944–2017), Italian football defender
- Taddeo Landini (c.1561–1596), Italian sculptor and architect

== See also ==
- Landi (disambiguation)
- Lando (disambiguation)
- Landolfi
