= Trevor Billingham =

Australian athletics administrator (1935-2005)

Personal information
- Nationality: Australian
- Born: 22 December 1935
- Died: 28 January 2005 (aged 69)
- Occupations: School teacher and administrator
- Years active: 1962-2005
- Spouse: Christine Billingham (Orr)

Sport
- Country: Australia
- Sport: Little Athletics

Achievements and titles
- Olympic finals: Torch bearer 1956 and 2000

Trevor Billingham BEM (22 December 1935 – 28 January 2005) was an Australian athletics administrator and he also founded the sports active organization Little Athletics. Billingham also carried the olympic flame in the 1956 Olympics and in the 2000 Olympics.

== Honours ==
Billingham was awarded the British Empire Medal in 1972 for services to sport.

== Career ==
Billingham was the founding secretary of the Geelong Regional Centre of the Victorian Amateur Athletic Association (VAAA) from December 1962 until 1968. He then served a term as Centre President in 1968-69, before moving his administrative talents to the Corio Venue, where he served as president until he retired in 1974 to take on the position of VAAA secretary. Billingham returned to the administration of senior athletics in Geelong after failing to be re-elected as VAAA secretary in 1975. He then served again on the Geelong Centre as a vice president and at the Corio Athletic Club as president until 1981.

Following his retirement from the sport of athletics, Billingham, through his work as a school teacher at Geelong's Corio Technical School, devoted his time and skills to the annual schools event, the Rock Eisteddfod. Following this period, he retired to his farm at Beremboke with his wife Christine (née Orr).

Billingham died on Friday 28 January 2005, which coincided with the first day of competition of the Victorian Country Athletics Championships being held at Landy Field in Geelong, an event with which Billingham had close links during the 1960s and 1970s. Billingham's funeral was held at Landy Field and was attended by former Olympians, including Ron Clarke.

In 2007 Billingham was one of a number of Geelong sporting personalities to be unveiled in the federally funded Geelong City Council, Geelong Legends Plaza, built at the western entrance to the Geelong Football Club at Kardinia Park. The plaza included another athletic icon in John Landy.
