= Mattisson =

Mattisson is a Swedish surname. Notable people with the surname include:

- Hasse Mattisson (born 1972), Swedish footballer and coach
- Tess Mattisson (born 1978), Swedish singer

== See also ==
- Mattison
- Christine Matison
