= Landini =

Landini may refer to

- Landini (surname)
  - Francesco Landini (c. 1325 – c. 1397), Italian composer
- Landini (tractor) produced by the Italian company Landini SpA
- Landini cadence, a technique in music composition named after composer Francesco Landini
