= Londo =

Londo may refer to:

== People ==
- Bardhyl Londo (1948–2022), Albanian poet and writer
- Dieudonné Londo (born 1976), Gabonese footballer
- Kai Londo (1845–1896), Kissi warrior from Sierra Leone
- Peeter Londo (1878–?), Estonian politician

== Fictional characters ==
- Londo Mollari, from the science fiction television series Babylon 5
- Timber Wolf (Brin Londo), DC Comics superhero
- Mar Londo, DC Comics character and Brin's father

== Other uses ==
- Londo language, a Bantu language in the Democratic Republic of the Congo

== See also ==
- Löndö Association, a political party in the Central African Republic
- Lando (disambiguation)
- Londos, a list of people with the surname
