= The Servant of Two Masters =

1746 play by Carlo Goldoni

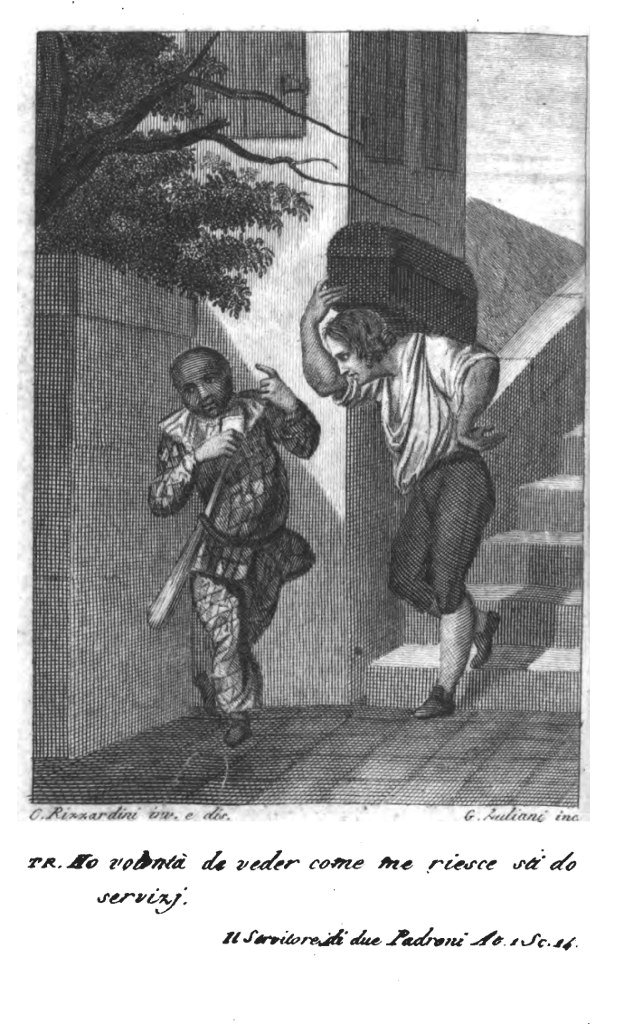
- "I'd like to see how I'll manage to serve two masters." Illustration from The Complete Comedies of Carlo Goldoni (1830)
- Original language: Italian, Venetian
- Written by: Carlo Goldoni
- Genre: Commedia dell'arte

Premiere
- Date: 1746

The Servant of Two Masters (Italian: Il servitore di due padroni) is a comedy by the Italian playwright Carlo Goldoni written in 1746. Goldoni originally wrote the play at the request of actor Antonio Sacco, one of the great Harlequins in history. His earliest drafts had large sections that were reserved for improvisation, but he revised it in 1789 in the version that exists today. The play draws on the tradition of the earlier Italian commedia dell'arte.

== Plot ==
=== Act 1 ===
The play opens with the engagement party between Clarice and Silvio, the daughter and son of Pantalone (also spelled Pantaloon) and Doctor Lombardi respectively. However, their celebration is cut short by the arrival of the exceptionally quirky and comical Harlequin (known in English as Truffaldino, which can be translated as "Fraudulent"), the servant of Clarice's supposedly deceased former fiancé, Federigo Rasponi. He reveals that Federigo is alive and wishes to renew his engagement, something Pantalone agrees to due to his money. Upon Federigo's entrance, it soon becomes apparent that 'Federigo' is actually his sister, Beatrice, disguised as her dead brother in search of the man who killed him, Florindo, who is also her lover. Her brother forbade her to marry Florindo, and died defending his sister's honor. She intends to go through with the engagement to Clarice, take the dowry money, locate Florindo, and flee. Brighella, a former acquaintance of the Rasponis', is the only one to realize the deception, but keeps Beatrice's secret.

Truffaldino soon meets Florindo, who has escaped to Venice, and talks his way in to also being a servant for him, with the intention of getting an extra dinner. Unaware they are searching for one another, Truffaldino attempts to hide his involvement, despite the difficulty arising from them both staying at Brighella's inn. Silvio, determined to defeat "Federigo" and marry Clarice, asks Truffaldino for his master, only for confusion to arise when he fetches Florindo instead. Truffaldino invents a fake friend of his - "Pasqual" - as a reason for multiple confusions involving letters, resulting in him reading out a letter intended for Beatrice to Florindo and giving him Clarice's dowry money also intended for Beatrice. This leads Beatrice to believe something has happened to her money despite Pantalone's insistence it was all sent correctly.

Meanwhile, Clarice is distraught over Pantalone's decision to marry her to "Federigo" and refuses to speak to Beatrice, causing her to reveal her true identity. Clarice immediately changes her mind about Beatrice and agrees to help her, only for their new friendship to be mistaken as a willingness to marry.

=== Act 2 ===
The situation also causes Doctor Lombardi to fall out with his friend, Pantalone. Silvio challenges Beatrice to a duel, only for her to easily defeat him. Clarice refuses to reveal Beatrice's secret causing Silvio to become angry and her to turn his sword on herself, but they are interrupted by Smeraldina (Pantalone's feisty servant, who is smitten with Truffaldino), who defends Clarice's honor causing her to change her mind and leave.

The most famous set-piece of the play occurs when the starving Truffaldino tries to serve a banquet to the entourages of both his masters without either group becoming aware of the other, while desperately trying to satisfy his own hunger at the same time.

Smeraldina and Truffaldino flirt, and he awkwardly attempts to admit his attraction to her. They decide to open and read a letter Smeraldina has been tasks with delivering to "Federigo" only to be halted as neither of them can read, or know Italian. They are caught by Beatrice and Pantalone, and when Truffaldino is forced to make another cover story for Florindo, he accidentally gets himself in trouble again. Frustrated, he calls for an interval.

=== Act 3 ===
Truffaldino rejoices in finally having a full meal. He is then tasked with airing out the clothes for both of his masters, only to become confused and put the wrong clothes in the each trunk. When Florindo finds an item of Beatrice's, Truffaldino lies that he inherited the trunk from a previous, now deceased master, convincing Florindo that Beatrice has died. He uses the same tactic on Beatrice, convincing her that Florindo is dead. Her impassioned plea after this revelation inadvertently reveals her true identity to him and the entering Pantalone who immediately heads to Doctor Lombardi to have Silvio engaged to Clarice again. However, he insults Pantalone and refuses, although Silvio is delighted.

Florindo and Beatrice both attempt to hang themselves at the same time, unaware they are directly next to each other. After realizing, they both are cut down and reunite happily. In an attempt to further hide his deception, Truffaldino lies separately to Florindo and Beatrice by stating that his friend Pasqual was the others servant and the actual one that caused the confusion, before then continuing in his charade of secretly working for the both of them.

Clarice and Silvio are happily engaged again, and Clarice's aid of Beatrice is revealed. Florindo and Beatrice arrive, finally clearing up the confusion over who Beatrice was. The last matter up for discussion is whether Truffaldino and Smeraldina can get married, which at last exposes Truffaldino's having played both sides all along. However, as everyone has just decided to get married, he is forgiven. Truffaldino asks Smeraldina to marry him.

== Characterization ==
The characters of the play are taken from the Italian Renaissance theatre style commedia dell'arte. In classic commedia tradition, an actor learns a stock character (usually accentuated by a mask) and plays it to perfection throughout his career. The actors had a list of possible scenarios, each with a very basic plot, called a canovaccio, and throughout would perform physical-comedy acts known as lazzi (from Italian lazzo, a joke or witticism) and the dialogue was improvised.

== Characters ==
The characters from The Servant of Two Masters are derived from stock characters used in commedia dell'arte. True commedia dell'arte is more or less improvised without a script, so The Servant of Two Masters is not true commedia. The stock characters were used as guides for the actors improvising.

- Truffaldino Battochio – Servant first to Beatrice, and afterward to Florindo. He is the love interest of Smeraldina (based on Arlecchino).
- Beatrice Rasponi – Master to Truffaldino, a lady of Turin and disguised as her brother Federigo Rasponi. She is the love interest of Florindo.
- Florindo Aretusi – Master to Truffaldino, of Turin and the love interest of Beatrice (an innamorati character who truly loves Beatrice)
- Pantalone Dei Bisognosi – A Venetian merchant (based on Pantalone)
- Smeraldina – Maidservant to Clarice and the love interest of Truffaldino (based on Columbina)
- Clarice – Pantalone's Daughter and the love interest of Silvio (based on Isabella)
- Silvio – Son of Dr. Lombardi and the love interest of Clarice (based on Flavio)
- Dr. Lombardi – Silvio's father (based on Il Dottore)
- Brighella – An Innkeeper
- First Waiter
- Second Waiter
- First Porter
- Second Porter

== Adaptations ==
There have been several adaptations of the play for the cinema and for the stage:

- The Hotel; or, The Servant with Two Masters by Robert Jephson, Esq. English language adaptation published in 1783, the stock character names were not used and the setting was changed to Granada, Spain.
- Слуга двух господ (Sluga dvukh gospod [Servant of Two Masters]) (1953) – a 1953 Soviet adaptation
- Slugă la doi stăpâni (1956) – a Romanian National Radiophonic Theater production; translation: Polixenia Carambi; artistic director: Constantin Moruzan
- The Servant o' Twa Maisters (1965) Scots language adaptation by Victor Carin
- Servant of Two Masters (1966) opera by Vittorio Giannini
- Harlekijn, kies je meester (1973) (TV) – Dutch adaptation
- Truffaldino from Bergamo (1976) (TV) – Soviet TV movie adaptation
- Servant of Two Masters (1978) Australian adaptation by Ron Blair and Nick Enright Later produced for television and frequently revived in Australia
- Sluha dvou pánů (Servant of Two Masters) (1994-2016), Czech theatrical adaptation in National Theatre, Prague; main role played by Miroslav Donutil
- Servant of Two Masters (1992) Directed by Irene Lewis; Baltimore Center Stage
- A Servant to Two Masters (1999) Adapted by Lee Hall
- Sługa dwóch panów (2003-2019) Translated into Polish by Jerzy Adamski, main role played by Jan Kobuszewski at Teatr Kwadrat, Warsaw, Poland
- The Servant of Two Masters (2004) Translated and adapted by Jeffrey Hatcher and Paolo Emilio Landi, first performed by Milwaukee Repertory Theater
- The Man With Two Gaffers (2006) Adapted by Blake Morrison, set in Victorian Skipton. First performed at York Theatre Royal 26 August 2006 by Northern Broadsides, directed by Barrie Rutter.
- Argelino, servidor de dos amos (2007) Adapted by Alberto San Juan, main role played by Javier Gutiérrez at Teatro de La Abadía
- One Man, Two Guvnors (2011) – set in 1960s Brighton, adapted by Richard Bean and first performed at The National Theatre, London
- Servant of Two Masters (2012) – adapted by Constance Congdon and first performed at The Lansburgh Theatre, Washington, D.C.
- Servant of Two Masters Bengali adaptation by Ashim Das as 'Nawkar Shoytaan Malik Hoyraan' and stage production produced by FAME under the direction of Ashim Das in Bangladesh.
- "The Servant of Two Masters“ adaptated and performed by Grupo de Teatro do Instituto Superior Técnico (GTIST) in Lisbon, Portugal, as "O Servidor de Dois Amos".
