= Londos =

Londos is a surname. Notable people with the surname include:

- Anastasios Londos (1791–1856), Greek politician and senator
- Andreas Londos (1786–1846), Greek military leader and politician
- Jim Londos (1894–1975), Greek-American professional wrestler

== See also ==
- Londo (disambiguation)
