= Frédéric Luca Landi =

French fashion designer (born 1973)

- Born: 8 April 1973 (age 53); Toulouse, France
- Occupations: Couturier, photographer, Artistic director

Frédéric Luca Landi (born 8 April 1973, in Toulouse) is a French fashion designer, photographer and editor.

== Early life ==
Born in Toulouse, Frédéric Luca Landi was devoting himself to be a surgeon. In 1994 the discovery of Avenue Montaigne made him decide to enter the world of fashion. In 1995, he applied in the famous school of the Fédération française de la couture, the Ecole de la Chambre Syndicale de la Haute Couture (created in 1928). Freshly graduated he immediately hired by Jean Paul Gaultier as he was launching his first Haute Couture collection. In 1999, John Galliano hired him to become the supervisor of the Haute Couture collections of Christian Dior. He started with the scandalous collection "Lady and the tramp". During those years at Christian Dior couture house, he was in charge of the realization of the red carpet outfits for movie stars such as: Hilary Swank, Nicole Kidman, Monica Bellucci, Penélope Cruz for big events as Academy Award and Festival de Cannes.

== House Frédéric Luca Landi ==
In 2005, Frédéric Luca Landi left the couture House Dior to create his own label in Antwerp, Belgium Fashion capital. His first creation was the wedding dress of the baronne Aurore Van Gysel de Meise. Since then, he got specialized in exclusive and unique designs for an international clientele. In 2009, he designed for the singer Natalia (Belgian singer) the contreversed dress for her New year eve's concert in Sportpaleis. He created for the pianist Eliane Reyes concert dresses for her rising star tour with Lorenzo Gatto winner of the Queen Elisabeth Music Competition in 2009. In 2012, he produced the event Moda Tempi, la mode habille la musique in Brussels. In recent years, FLL has introduced its designs and creations to the Asian audiences. Through collaboration with his Chinese-American partner, they started the Difre Project. This portal showcases the two designers' fusion concepts, ideas and fashion. Their works are continuingly attracting more and more local media as well as international celebraties such as Coco Lee.

== Photography ==
As Karl Lagerfeld, Landi developed his photography skills specially for foreign magazines such as Le Temps (Geneva). In his photography job, he enjoyed staging others fashion designers in-light of their art in different ways. Frédéric Luca Landi loves art photography. In his work he often used his own jewelry creations which are worked in 3D and especially for shoulders.

In 2004, Landi presented his first exhibition: Sacré, Portraits Haute Couture in Paris, with 20 portraits among which we find the couturier Stéphane Rolland, Diana Law and Yves Gastou.

== Editing ==
Frédéric Luca Landi starts with film editing with the Difré Project in collaboration with artistic director Diana Law. The production of Difré Project Hong Kong (Teaser1) was released on April 17, 2012 with a Difre Project Hong Kong (Teaser2) released on July 21, 2012.
