= Landi Swanepoel =

South African model (born 1979)

Landi Swanepoel (born 8 October 1979, in Cape Town) is a South African model.

She is known for her campaigns for Guess?, but her highest accolade was her selection as the "Sylvia" character in Peroni's Nastro Azzurro beer commercial that pays homage to Federico Fellini's La Dolce Vita. The role was originally played by Anita Ekberg. She was discovered as a model when she was fourteen while shopping with her mother.

She also has been in advertisements for Chanel and Land Rover and appeared on the cover of FHM.

Swanepoel has also been in the South African edition of Sports Illustrated and the book A second decade of Guess? Images. She has been compared to young Brigitte Bardot.

Swanepoel also appeared in Maxim's February 2009 Swimsuit Issue.
