= Anthony Herbert (lieutenant colonel) =

United States Army officer

Anthony B. Herbert
- Born: 7 April 1930; Herminie, Pennsylvania, U.S.
- Died: 7 June 2014 (aged 84); Cañon City, Colorado, U.S.
- Spouse: Mary Grace nee Natale
- Military career
- Allegiance: United States of America
- Branch: United States Army
- Service years: 1947–1952, 1956–1972
- Rank: Lieutenant colonel
- Unit: 173rd Airborne Brigade
- Commands: 2nd Battalion, 503rd Infantry
- Conflicts: Korean War; Vietnam War; Dominican Republic Incursion
- Awards: Silver Star (4); Legion of Merit; Soldier's Medal; Bronze Star (4); Purple Heart (4); Air Medal (2); Army Commendation Medal (4)

Anthony B. Herbert (7 April 1930 – 7 June 2014) was a United States Army officer, who served in both the Korean War and the Vietnam War. He is best known for his claims that he witnessed war crimes in Vietnam, which his commanding officer refused to investigate. He reached the rank of lieutenant colonel and was the author of several books about his experiences, including Soldier and Making of A Soldier.

== Military career ==
Herbert enlisted in the United States Army in May 1947 to be a paratrooper. He completed Basic Combat Training at Fort Dix, New Jersey, and Basic Airborne School at Fort Benning, Georgia. After a few months of service in the peacetime Army at Fort Lewis, Washington, he accepted a discharge in 1948, returned home and graduated from high school. He then re-enlisted in the Army in February 1950 and became a paratrooper in the 82nd Airborne Division.

=== Korean War ===
Herbert deployed for Korea in October on the troopship Walker. It was here, in the Korean War, that he first built his reputation as a fighter, and was rapidly promoted to become one of the youngest master sergeants in the Army, and one of the most decorated.

Herbert was selected by General Matthew Ridgway in 1951 to represent the American soldier in Korea and returned to the U.S., going to the White House to meet President Harry Truman, and traveling the country to promote the war.

It was during this time that Herbert met former first lady Eleanor Roosevelt and was persuaded by her to go to college and gain an education, for whatever he would do with the rest of his life. Herbert left the U.S. Army once again in 1952 to enter the University of Pittsburgh in order to complete a Bachelor of Arts degree, graduating in 1956 and re-entering the Army as a second lieutenant in the Pennsylvania National Guard.

At the same time, Herbert accessioned for active duty and began the Infantry Officer's Basic Course (then called Basic Infantry Officer's Course, or BIOC) at Fort Benning, Georgia. After graduating that course with high marks, he was assigned as an instructor to the Mountain Ranger Training Camp at Dahlonega, Georgia. David Donovan, one of his cadets, reported being "impressed by his charisma, his leadership ability, and his military expertise." Herbert followed this with assignments of increasing responsibility and was promoted quickly.

=== Author ===
- Conquest to Nowhere, self published, 1954
- Soldier, Holt, Rinehart and Winston; 1st edition (1973)
- Herbert--The Making of a Soldier, Hippocrene Books, 1982
- Complete Security Handbook, Scribner, 1983
- International Traveler's Security Handbook, Hippocrene Books, 1984
- Military Manual of Self Defense, Hippocrene Books, 1991

=== Personal appearance ===
Anthony Herbert and his wife Mary Grace appeared on the 6 October 1955 episode of the TV quiz program You Bet Your Life, hosted by Groucho Marx. At the time, Herbert was studying creative writing and psychology at the University of Pittsburgh. His book Conquest to Nowhere about the Korean War was mentioned. Herbert and his wife won $110.

=== Vietnam War ===
He was first deployed in Vietnam War in 1968 with the Inspector General's Office assigned to the 173d Airborne Brigade, a unit with which he would later make a dramatic mark, and one in which he would encounter many controversial roles later on. He commanded the 2nd Battalion (Airborne), 503rd Infantry.

In the wake of the controversy surrounding the My Lai massacre, Herbert claimed to have witnessed a number of war crimes in Vietnam, which he reported to his superiors but which they allegedly refused to curb or discipline. Herbert pressed charges against his commanding officers for their intransigence.

Herbert had reported eight separate war crimes, including incidents of looting, execution and murder.

In one episode involving some Vietnamese girls Herbert stated, "The area was brilliantly lit by floodlights ... Each of them [the girls] was seated with their hands on a table, palms down." Herbert described the instruments used as a "long springy rod of bamboo split into dozens of tight, thin flails on one end. It was a murderous weapon", he said. "I'd seen it take the hide off a buffalo. When it was struck down hard, the flails splayed out like a fan, but an instant after impact they returned to their order, pinching whatever was beneath."

According to Herbert, "War crimes are infinitely easier to overlook than to explain to an investigating committee. Nor do they do much for promotion among the 'West Point Protection Society' of the Army's upper-echelon career men. So when I kept bringing up the matter, I kept on making enemies and getting answers such as, 'what the hell did you expect, Herbert? Candy and flowers?' I reported these things and nothing happened."

Some commentators have opined that Herbert's allegations were exaggerated or unsubstantiated. The Army also released a statement to the effect that Herbert had raised the war crimes issue for the first time in September 1970, eighteen months after he was relieved of command in Vietnam and only after he had exhausted other means of salvaging his military career.

Herbert was accused of exaggeration and outright lying in his filed reports. In April 1969 he was relieved of his command of the Second Battalion, despite its outstanding record under his leadership.

"I know now it wasn't just the Army", Herbert says. "It was General Westmoreland in particular. He did everything he possibly could to keep my case covered up because of the heat being placed on the Army from the My Lai case."

The U.S. Army's Criminal Investigation Division (CID) produced several reports on Herbert's claims. A report dated August 23, 1971, reviewing Herbert's allegations stated: "technique employed included the transmission of electrical shock by means of a field telephone [used to a Vietnamese girl] a water rag treatment which impaired breathing, hitting with sticks and boards, and beating of detainees with fists."

A CID report marked FOR OFFICIAL USE ONLY: "Herbert's S-3 [non-commissioned officer] witnessed a field telephone in use during interrogation, but no objection was raised".

Dozens of official CID documents substantiated Herbert's statements. Despite this, the Army claimed that Herbert had "a propensity to lie or exaggerate." The deputy brigade commander of the 173d Airborne, Col. J. Ross Franklin stated that Herbert "was incapable of telling the truth, even on inconsequential matters ... And after [one combat assault], I realized the man was extremely dangerous. I had doubts even as to his sanity, and I was fearful for what he might do in the future."

On 15 March 1971, Herbert reported 14 separate charges to his superior J. Ross Franklin, including corpse mutilation and the electrical torture of a Vietnamese girl by Army intelligence.

Herbert gave interviews to Life, The New York Times, Playboy and on the Dick Cavett Show. He took voluntary polygraph tests and passed. "Army harassment increased until at last, my family began to show signs of stress from the ordeal", Herbert said.

== Retirement ==
Feeling pressured by the Army, on 7 November 1971, Herbert set his own retirement in motion, retiring from the United States Army in February 1972.

A year later Herbert and New York Times correspondent James Wooten wrote the best selling book Soldier, an autobiographical book documenting his efforts to expose both the incompetence and the atrocities he'd seen in Vietnam.

Some years after his retirement from the Army, he was asked in an interview how he felt about leaving the Army after all that had come to pass. He remarked, "If you stick by your guns, if you stand by the truth, you win. I feel good about my time in Vietnam and my time in the Army. As my friend Sgt. Maj. John Bittorie once said, 'There are two kinds of military reputations. One is official and on paper in Washington DC. The other is the one that goes from bar to bar from the mouths of those who served with you there.' That is the only reputation I ever really cared about."

== "The Selling of Colonel Herbert" ==
On February 4, 1973, CBS's 60 Minutes aired a segment titled "The Selling of Colonel Herbert". CBS correspondent Mike Wallace and producer Barry Lando challenged his credibility, implying that Soldier was fictitious and that Herbert himself was guilty of war crimes.

Supporting the CBS allegations against Herbert on the show was Herbert's old nemesis, Colonel J. Ross Franklin, who had been relieved of his command for throwing a Vietnamese body out of a helicopter. (Franklin retired from the Army in 1980 and in 1991 was convicted and sent to prison to serve a five-year sentence for his role in a securities scam.)

Herbert suspected that the Nixon administration put pressure on CBS, which led to the story. CBS president Frank Stanton was under subpoena for an earlier broadcast called The Selling of the Pentagon. At about that time, Stanton paid a visit to Nixon White House counsel Charles Colson, who later said in The New York Times that Stanton volunteered to help Nixon and was unusually accommodating.

=== Herbert v. Lando ===
Herbert sued CBS over the 60 Minutes segment on February 4, 1973 that painted him as a liar. The charge stemmed from an appearance he made on the show, when host Mike Wallace surprised him by bringing one of Herbert's Army colleagues into the interview, who proceeded to deny the veracity of much of Herbert's story.

The case reached the United States Supreme Court (Herbert v. Lando, 441 U.S. 153 (1979)). The court ruled that defendants have no privilege under the First Amendment which would bar a plaintiff from inquiring into the editorial process or states of mind of those involved in the alleged libel, if the inquiry was tailored to the production of evidence considered material to plaintiff's necessary burden of proof.

This ruling allowed Herbert to seek proof of the alleged libel.

In 1986 [Herbert v. Lando, 781 F.2d 298 (2d Cir. 1986)], the U.S. Court of Appeals in New York dismissed the libel suit. Judge Irving R. Kaufman, a member of the three-judge panel, ruled Herbert had no grounds to take his case to trial in a 43-page opinion. The opinion stated the CBS story was essentially accurate. To go to trial over some minor unresolved issues would be a "classic case of the tail wagging the dog."

Herbert was reportedly considering again appealing his case to the U.S. Supreme Court. It was Judge Kaufman whom the Supreme Court reversed in the 1979 decision. Jonathan Lubell, Herbert's attorney, claimed that Kaufman has long been sympathetic to the press.

== Post-military life ==
During Herbert's military career, he earned a doctorate in psychology, and later become a police and clinical psychologist. Herbert died of cancer on 7 June 2014 at the age of 84. His death was not made public until after his burial at Arlington National Cemetery, in February 2015.

== Awards and decorations ==
Herbert was awarded four Silver Stars, three Bronze Star Medals with a 'V' for valor, six battle stars, four Purple Hearts. He was wounded 14 times—10 by bullets, 3 by bayonet, and once by white phosphorus.

Ranger tab
Combat Infantryman Badge, second award
Expert Infantryman Badge
Master Parachutist Badge
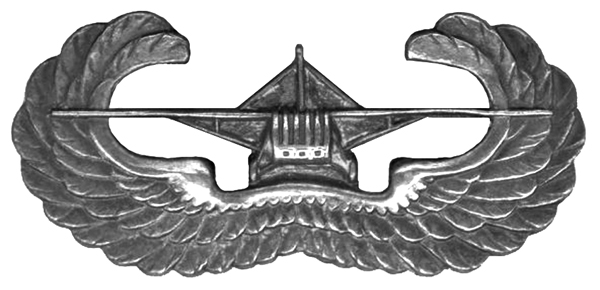
Glider Badge
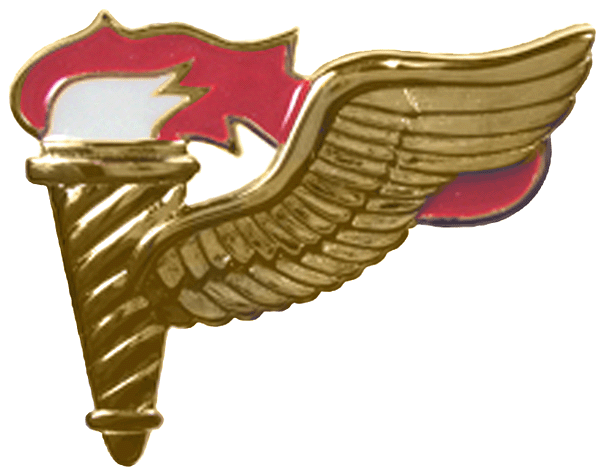
Pathfinder Badge
Silver Star with 3 oak leaf clusters
Legion of Merit
Soldiers Medal
Bronze Star Medal with 2 oak leaf clusters and "V" Device designating heroism or valor
Air Medal with Bronze Numeral "2"
Purple Heart with 3 oak leaf clusters
Army Commendation Medal with 3 oak leaf clusters and "V' Device
Good Conduct Medal
Army of Occupation Medal
National Defense Service Medal with bronze service star
Korean Service Medal with 6 service stars
Armed Forces Expeditionary Medal
Vietnam Service Medal with 4 service stars
Armed Forces Reserve Medal (Army) with bronze hourglass device.
United Nations Service Medal
RVN Campaign Medal w/ 1960- Device
Korean War Service Medal
Presidential Unit Citation w/3 OLCs
Meritorious Unit Commendation
Presidential Unit Citation (Korea)
RVN Gallantry Cross with Palm and Frame Unit Citation
RVN Civil Actions with Palm and Frame Unit Citation
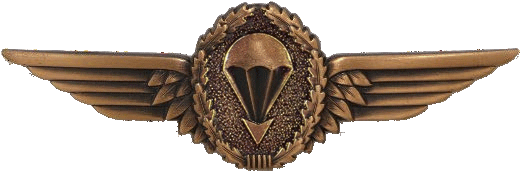
German Army Parachute Wings
British Army Parachute Wings

=== Reception of a Turkish award ===
In the 1955 book Conquest to Nowhere, by Herbert, it is stated that he received an "Osminieh" from the then president of Turkey Celâl Bayar for his service with the Turkish brigade in the Korean War. This claim was made as well in his later book Soldier (1973), and reprinted in the Schenectady Gazette. In later accounts, in 2006, this award was described in an article on Herbert that stated he received the "coveted Turkish Ozanu Order".
