= Bibi Landó =

Actress, businesswoman, television and radio host

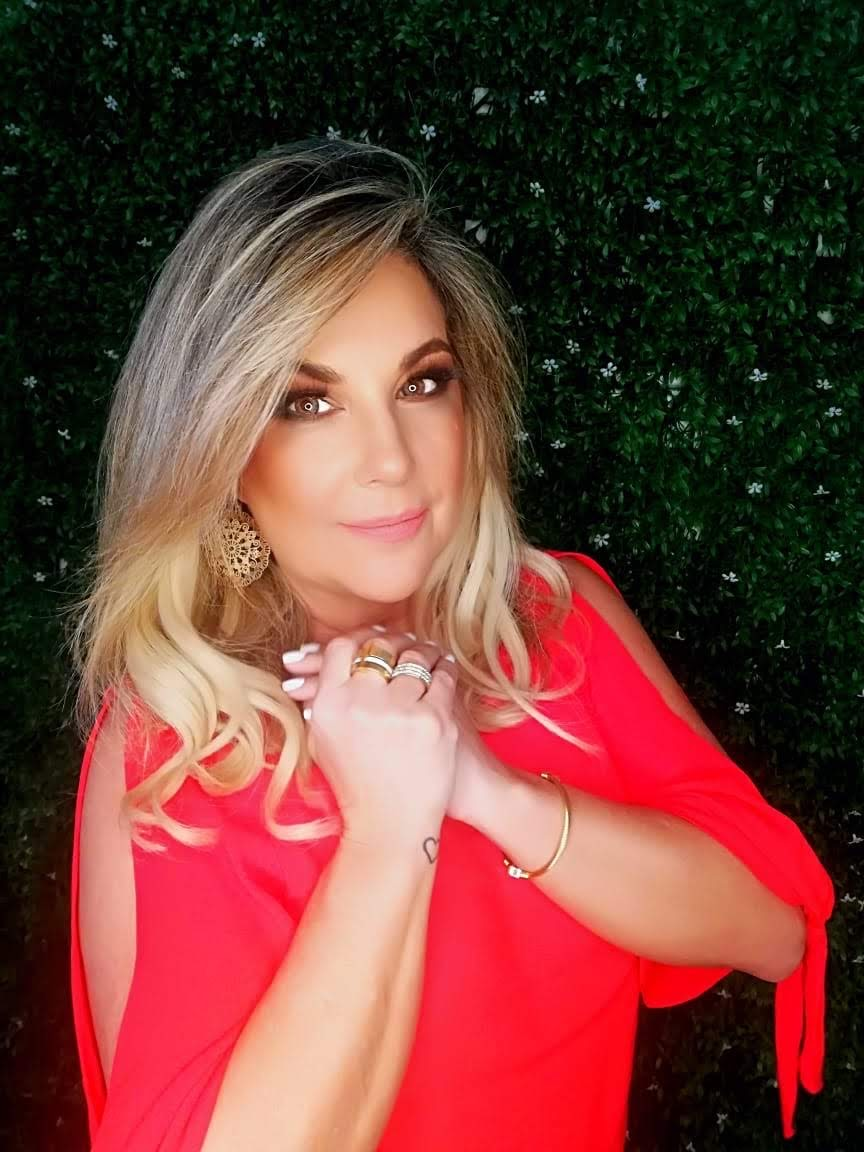
- Born: Bibiana María Landó Meyer; 11 September 1961 (age 64); Asunción, Paraguay
- Occupations: radio/television host, businesswoman, actress
- Years active: 1988–present

Bibiana María Landó Meyer, better known as Bibi Landó (born 11 September 1967) is an actress, businesswoman, and television and radio host from Paraguay.

She was a television host for newscasts as well as entertainment programs such as "El Sueño Mágico de Bibi"(version of El Show de Xuxa) which was a show for children on Channel 9. Currently she is in charge of the programs "El Doctor en Casa" on Paraguay TV, "Residentas" from Canal GEN and "Tiempo de Unión" on Radio La Unión. She comes from a well-known family in Paraguay, which includes her mother writer Marta Meyer de Landó; her brother, chef Enrique Landó, and her nephew Paul Landó, a Paraguayan YouTuber.
