= Lando Fiorini =

Italian singer (1938–2017)

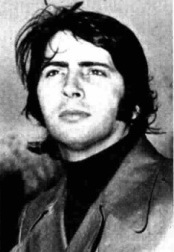
- Fiorini in 1974
- Born: Leopoldo Fiorini; 27 January 1938; Rome, Kingdom of Italy
- Died: 9 December 2017 (aged 79); Rome, Italy
- Occupations: Singer, actor
- Height: 1.74 m (5 ft 9 in)

Leopoldo "Lando" Fiorini (27 January 1938 – 9 December 2017) was an Italian actor and singer, known primarily for having sung folk songs from Rome in Italian and Romanesco.

His career started in 1961, when he took part in the musical festival Cantagiro and was noted by the duo of playwrights Garinei & Giovannini, who chose him for the role of the cantastorie in the successful musical Rugantino. He was the founder and artistic director of a cabaret nightclub, Puff, where he launched the career of several comedians, notably Lino Banfi, Enrico Montesano and Leo Gullotta.

His cabaret show Ma 'ndo vai se il decoder non-ce l'hai, satirized Italian television.

== Discography ==
- 1963 — Rugantino
- 1964 — Roma Mia
- 1966 — Passeggiate romane
- 1970 — E questo amore
- 1971 — Bella quanno te fece mamma tua
- 1972 — Roma ieri e oggi
- 1974 — Roma ruffiana
- 1975 — A Roma è sempre primavera
- 1976 — Passa la serenata / Una preghiera per Roma sparita
- 1977 — Forza Roma
- 1977 — Co’ amore e co’ rabbia
- 1982 — Mozzichi e baci
- 1982 — Amore giallorosso
- 1984 — Souvenir di Roma / Momenti d’amore
- 1985 — Tra i sogni e la vita
- 1986 — Le più belle canzoni romane
- 1991 — E adesso l’amore
- 1993 — Puff…Lando ed altri successi
- 1995 — Una voce… una città
- 1996 — Ci sarà pure un grande amore
- 2000 — Roma, un sogno dentro una canzone
- 2001 — Forza Roma
- 2002 — Favole, sonetti di Trilussa e canzoni di Lando Fiorini
- 2002 — Tra le gente
- 2005 — Come se po’ spiega’ cos’è l’amore – Edizione Platinum
- 2005 — Così è la Vita
- 2007 — 100 Campane 100 Canzoni
- 2010 — Ti presento Roma mia
