= Paolo Emilio Landi =

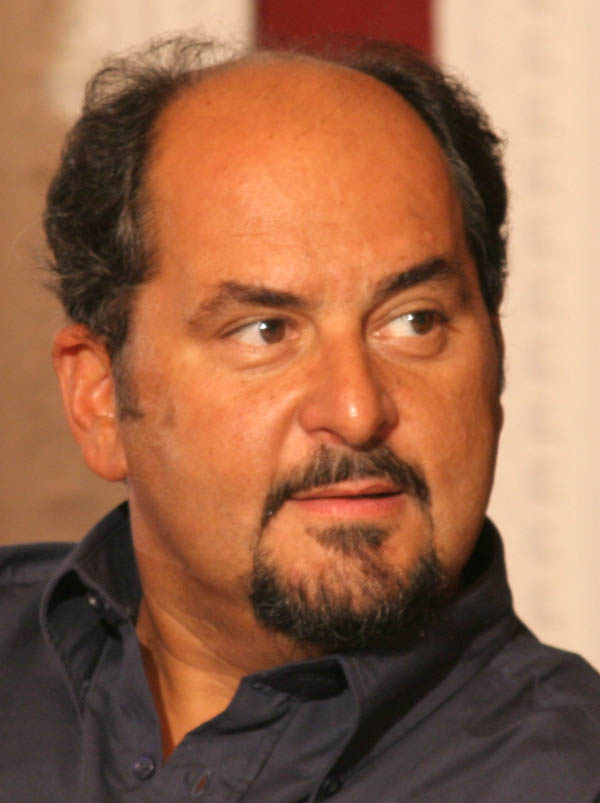

Paolo Emilio Landi is an Italian theatrical director, journalist, and documentarian. He has filmed worldwide a number of documentaries for RAI (National Italian Broadcasting Company). He directed plays at several different theatres in the US, in Russian Federation and former Soviet Union.

== Theater ==
Landi made his professional directing debut with the Italian national premiere of After Magritte (1986), by the English author Tom Stoppard. with scenery designed by the American painter Jack Frankfurter. His following production, The Bald Soprano by Eugene Ionesco, was performed in Italy, France (Avignon Festival), the USA (Richmond, Virginia), and Russia (Omsk and Saratov).

After the fall of the Berlin Wall he continued his career in former URSS. In 1990 he worked in the previously closed town of Omsk. Omsk Drama Theatre, Russia He was the first director to stage an absurdist play, The Bald Soprano, in a Russian State Academic Theatre of the USSR.

He went on to stage 30 shows in academic and public theaters in cities throughout Russia and Eastern Europe, including Moscow, Saint Petersburg, Omsk, Samara, Saratov, Riga, Vilnius, Chelyabinsk, Krasnoyarsk. and Ufa. In 2025 his Ladies's Night at Samara Academic Drama Theatre, reached 500 performances becoming one of the longest running show in all Russia.

In the late nineties Paolo Emilio Landi traveled to the United States for his production of The Servant of Two Masters by Carlo Goldoni at the Milwaukee Repertory Theater. He then began a long association with the University of Richmond (Virginia) where he has been visiting scholar and instructor of theater and documentary-making. During his time at the university he specialized in creating experimental works with students and faculty.

== Television ==
In 1982 Landi began collaborating with the television program Protestantesimo on Raidue (the State Italian Broadcasting Company) as a director, journalist and host. During his time with the 50-year old program, he produced hundreds of news stories, documentaries, musical programs and studio interviews.

In 2001 he became a member of the Order of Journalists of Lazio. He has directed and produced documentaries in Europe, Africa, Asia, and the Americas.

For Rai WORLD, (The Other Italy), he filmed more than 400 portraits of Italians living in South Africa, mostly in the cities of Johannesburg, Cape Town, and Durban. He recently released a 14 episodes serie called "Cape to the Equator".

In 2015 Landi released a documentary on Nelson Mandela, broadcast on Italy's RAIDUE, as well as France 2, RSI (the Italian Swiss Broadcasting company) and RTS (the French Swiss broadcasting company)

Landi most recent film work includes three documentaries shot in Washington, DC and New York City, USA. They are: L'ultimo giorno (9.11.2001) (The Last Day); So Help Me God (Trump at the White House); 100 giorni di Trump. (Trump's First Hundred Days). He filmed the last interview with late Winnie Madizikela Mandela.in 2024 released Namibia, the desert, a 55 minutes documentary for RAI. Since 2014 he directed more than 400 doc-stories about Italians around the world. He's also author of Cape to Equator, a filmed journey in 8 south-african countries, broadcast by RAI ITALIA.

== International theatre productions ==
USA

- The Servant of Two Masters by Carlo Goldoni, adaptation by Jeff Hatcher and Paolo Emilio Landi, with Lee Ernst in the title role, Milwaukee Repertory Theater, Milwaukee, Wisconsin, 1999.
- The Venetian Twins by Carlo Goldoni, University of Richmond, VA, 2002.
- The Chairs and The Bald Soprano by Eugene Ionesco, University of Richmond, VA, 2006.
- The Servant of Two Masters by Carlo Goldoni, adaptation by Jeff Hatcher and Paolo Emilio Landi, Newark, Delaware REP, 2013.
- Heir Apparent by David Ives, Quill Theater, Richmond, VA.

Russia

- The Bald Soprano by Eugene Ionesco. State Omsk Drama Theatre, 1991.
- Venetian Twins by Carlo Goldoni, State Omsk Drama Theatre, 1995.
- Misery and Nobility by Eduardo Scarpetta, State Omsk Drama Theatre, 1998.
- Venetian Twins by Carlo Goldoni, Samara Drama National Theatre (Russia), 2000.
- Filumena Marturano by Eduardo De Filippo, Saratov Youth Theatre, 2001.
- Man and Gentleman by Eduardo De Filippo, State Omsk Drama Theatre, 2002.
- Ladies' Night by J. Collard, Samara Drama National Theatre, 2002.
- Servant of Two Masters by Carlo Goldoni, adaptation by Jeff Hatcher and Paolo Emilio Landi, Saratov Youth Theatre, 2003.
- They Shoot Horses, Don't They? from H. Mc Coy, adaptation by Dmitri Lebedev e Paolo E. Landi, Samara Drama National Theatre (Russia), 2004.
- Venetian Twins by Carlo Goldoni,( Carnevale Edition) - Ufa Drama National Theatre (Bashkhortostan, Russian Federation), 2005.
- Noises Off by Michael Frayn, Saratov Youth Theatre (Russia), 2006.
- Imaginary Invalid by Molière, State Omsk Drama Theatre, 2008.
- Chairs & Bald Soprano by Eugene Ionesco, Saratov Youth Theatre (Russia), 2008.
- Misery and Nobility by Eduardo Scarpetta, State Chelyabinsk Drama Theatre, 2009.
- Miser by Molière, Ufa Drama National Theatre (Bashkhortostan, Russian Federation), 2009.
- Love of the Three Oranges by Carlo Gozzi, Saratov Youth Theatre (Russia), 2010
- Naples Town of Millionaires by Eduardo de Filippo, Ufa Drama National Theatre (Bashkhortostan, Russian Federation), 2011.
- Venetian Twins by Carlo Goldoni, Teatro Na Taganka, Moscow (Russia) 2011.
- Bullets over Broadway from Woody Allen's movie, Samara Drama National Theatre, 2013
- Pinocchio adaptation from Carlo Collodi's novel, Saratov Youth Theatre (Russia), 2014.
- Man and Gentleman by Eduardo De Filippo, Samara Academic Drama Theatre, 2015
- Misery and Nobility by Eduardo Scarpetta, 2015.
- The Fool's doctor by Eduardo Scarpetta, Ufa Drama National Theatre (Bashkhortostan, Russian Federation), 2018.
- Neapolitan Holiday by Eduardo Scarpetta, Yaroslavl Academic Theatre, Volkov, Yaroslav, Russian Federation, 2019.
- Man and Gentleman by Eduardo De Filippo, Comedy Theatre, Saint Petersburg, 2024.
- Venetian Twins by Carlo Goldoni, Yaroslavl Academic Theatre, Volkov, Yaroslavl, Russian Federation, 2024
- Neapolitan Holiday by Eduardo Scarpetta, Samara Academic Drama Theatre, 2025

Lithuania

- SMS, All about man ( Strip man show aka Viskas Apie Vyrus) by Paolo E. Landi, Jaunimo Teatras, Vilnius, 2004, in Lithuanian.
- Triukšmas Už Kulisų - Noises Off by Michael Frayn, Jaunimo Teatras, Vilnius, 2007, in Lithuanian.
- Vargsai. Aristokratai by Eduardo Scarpetta, Jaunimo Teatras, Vilnius, 2007, in Lithuanian.

Latvia

- The Man, the Best, the Virtue by Luigi Pirandello, Riga Russian National Drama Theatre, 1993.
- Misery and Nobility by Eduardo Scarpetta, Riga Russian National Drama Theatre, 2008.
- Man and Gentleman by Eduardo De Filippo, Riga Russian National Drama Theatre, 2011.
- Filumena Marturano by Eduardo De Filippo, 2013.

France

- La Cantatrice Chauve by Eugene Ionesco, Festival d'Avignon, 1995.

Germany

- Tragedies in two lines, by Achille Campanile, 1992.

== Books ==
- Giorgio Bouchard, Paolo Emilio Landi, Bibbia e libertà - Otto secoli di storia valdese, Claudiana, Torino, 2006
- Carlo Goldoni translated and adapted by Jeffrey Hatcher and Paolo Emilio Landi, Dramatist Play service INC, 2000
- Paolo Emilio Landi, In Nome di Dio - Guerra di religione nelle Isole Molucche, Sinnos, Roma, 2000
