= Lando Platform railway station =

Disused railway station in Pembrey, Carmarthenshire

Lando Platform

General information
- Location: Pembrey, Carmarthenshire; Wales
- Platforms: 2

Other information
- Status: Disused

History
- Original company: Great Western Railway
- Pre-grouping: Great Western Railway
- Post-grouping: Great Western Railway

Key dates
- 15 September 1915: Opened as Lando Siding
- ?: Name changed to Lando Siding
- September 1928: Name changed to Lando Platform
- 15 June 1964: Closed
Location

Lando Platform railway station served the village of Pembrey, Carmarthenshire, Wales, from 1915 to 1964 on the South Wales Railway.

== History ==
The station was opened as Lando Siding on 15 September 1915 by the Great Western Railway, although the agreements for the services were made on 19 September and the first trains ran on 20 September of the same year. It did not appear in the timetable as it only served workmen. Its name was changed to Lando Halt later, but it was changed again to Lando Platform in September 1928. This name was added to the Railway Clearing House handbook in January 1948. It closed on 15 June 1964.

Preceding station	Historical railways	Following station
Pembrey and Burry Port; Line and station open	Great Western Railway; South Wales Railway	Kidwelly; Line and station open
