= Aristodemo Landi =

Italian painter

Aristodemo Landi (Tuscany, active after 1880) was an Italian painter, mainly depicting flowers and genre scenes.

== Biography ==
He was a resident of Florence. In 1880 at Turin, he displayed the painting Chi lardi arriva male alloggia; Le mie simpatie; Foglie e fiori; Animali che ammiravansi a Milan in 1881; Dichiarazione d'amore; Complimento, and Le oche del Campidoglio, last exhibited at Rome in 1883. In 1881, he exhibited Begonias in the Royal Academy Exhibition in London.
