= Barry Lando =

Canadian journalist (born 1939)

- Born: 8 June 1939 (age 87)
- Occupations: Journalist, Author and Producer
- Television: CBS' 60 Minutes
- Website: http://BarryMLando.com/

Barry Lando (born June 8, 1939) is a Canadian journalist, author, and former producer for CBS' 60 Minutes.

== Career ==
Lando graduated from Harvard University in 1961 and Columbia University. He was a producer for 60 Minutes for over 25 years, most of those producing stories for Mike Wallace. Lando produced the first interview with the Ayatollah Khomeini after the 1979 Iran hostage crisis, which aired 14 days after the hostages were captured. Another famous story he produced was on the 1990 Temple Mount riots. Wallace said of Lando and another producer, "if it wasn't for [Marion Goldin] and Barry there would be no 60 Minutes."

Lando pioneered the use of hidden cameras for investigative television reporting. He was awarded a George Polk award for Television Reporting in 1977. Lando and Wallace won a Robert F. Kennedy Journalism award in 1990 for the segment "40,000 a Day." Lando also won two Emmys at 60 Minutes.

In 2004, Lando collaborated with Michel Despratx to produce a documentary for Canal+ called "Saddam Hussein, the Trial the World Will Never See." Lando's 2007 book, Web of Deceit: The History of Western Complicity in Iraq, From Churchill to Kennedy to George W. Bush, covered 85 years of Western intervention in Iraq. Lando has written for The Atlantic, the Los Angeles Times, the Christian Science Monitor, the International Herald Tribune, and Le Monde.

== Herbert v. Lando ==
Colonel Anthony Herbert sued Lando and Wallace for libel for a 1973 60 Minutes broadcast that painted Herbert as a liar. The case reached the United States Supreme Court as Herbert v. Lando 441 U.S. 153 (1979). It was part of a series of appellate cases that set the boundaries of the press's right to publish information about private and public figures and an important authority for plaintiffs in defamation cases.
