= Mattison =

Mattison is a surname. Notable people with the surname include:

- Alexander Mattison (born 1998), American football player
- Alice Mattison, American novelist and short story writer
- Andrew Mattison (1948–2005), medical psychologist and researcher
- Bryan Mattison (born 1984), American football guard
- Donald Mattison (1905–1975), American artist
- Greg Mattison (born 1949), American football coach
- Harry Mattison (born 1948), American photographer
- Jenna Mattison (born 1976), American actress, screenwriter and producer
- Landy Mattison (born 1983), American soccer defender
- Mike Mattison, American musician and the lead vocalist of The Derek Trucks Band
- Tyler Mattison (born 1999), American baseball player

== See also ==
- Keasbey and Mattison Company, manufacturing company that produced asbestos and related building products before being purchased by Turner & Newall in 1934
