= List of storms named Lando =

The name Lando has been used for three tropical cyclones in the Philippine Area of Responsibility by PAGASA in the Western Pacific Ocean. It replaced the name Lakay after it was removed for unknown reasons following the 2003 Pacific typhoon season.

- Typhoon Hagibis (2007) (T0724, 24W, Lando) – an erratic, late-season typhoon which traversed the Philippines twice.
- Tropical Depression Lando (2011) – a weak and short-lived system which was only recognized by PAGASA and JMA.
- Typhoon Koppu (2015) (T1524, 24W, Lando) – a strong typhoon that struck the Philippines, claiming 62 lives and inflicting a damage total worth ₱14.4 billion (US$313 million).

The name Lando was retired following the 2015 Pacific typhoon season and was replaced with Liwayway, which is a feminine given name meaning "dawn" in Tagalog.
