= Landy Mattison =

American soccer defender (born 1983)

Personal information
- Date of birth: January 4, 1983 (age 43)
- Place of birth: Raleigh, North Carolina, United States
- Height: 6 ft 0 in (1.83 m)
- Position: Defender

Team information
- Current team: Minneapolis City SC

College career
Years	Team	Apps	(Gls)
2001	Florida International		
2002–2004	Clemson		

Senior career*
Years	Team	Apps	(Gls)
2003	Nashville Metros	25	(5)
2005	Atlanta Silverbacks	19	(0)
2006	Chicago Fire	0	(0)
2007–2009	Wilmington Hammerheads	33	(0)
2015–	Minneapolis City	1	(0)
- * Club domestic league appearances and goals

Landy Mattison (born January 4, 1983, in Raleigh, North Carolina) is an American soccer defender, who played professionally in the MLS, USL First and Second Divisions.

While born in North Carolina, Mattison grew up in Franklin, Tennessee. He attended Centennial High School where he was an All State soccer player and part of the United States men's national under-17 soccer team. He also played basketball, baseball, and was an All Region football player. He began his college career at Florida International University in 2001. In 2002, he transferred to the University of Clemson. In 2003 and 2004, he played for the Nashville Metros of the Premier Development League. On April 15, 2005, Mattison signed with the Atlanta Silverbacks of the USL First Division. In 2006, he signed with the Chicago Fire. While he played games with the Fire Reserves, but saw no first team games. While he spent most of the 2007 season with the Wilmington Hammerheads of the USL Second Division, he also saw time with the Chicago Fire Reserves in September. In 2008, he continued to be called up to the Fire, this time for September 25, 2008, non-league exhibition match with Tiburones Rojos de Veracruz. He left the team at the end of the 2008 season.
