= Landy Field =

Athletics field in Australia

John Landy Athletics Field
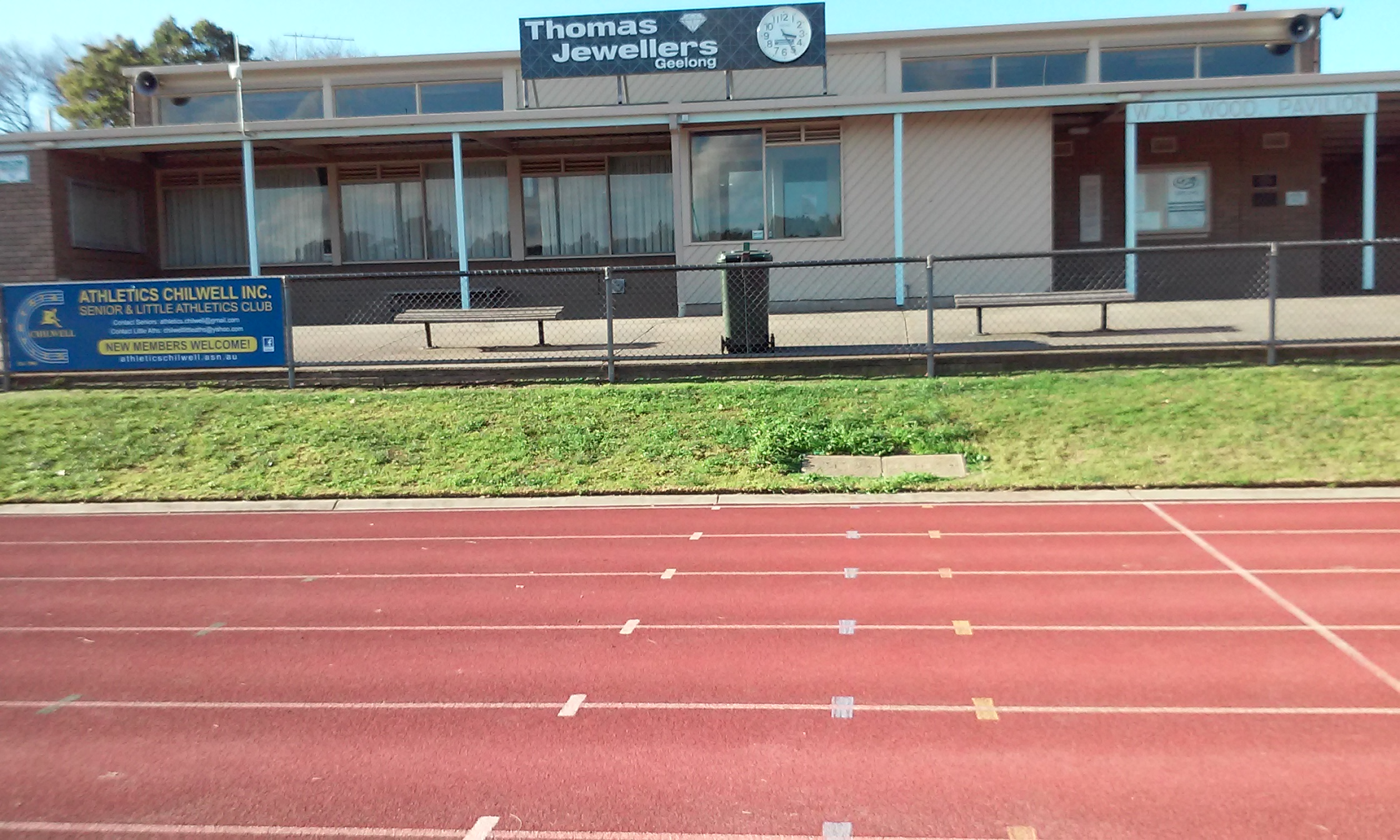
- Landy Field in August 2017
- Interactive map of John Landy Athletics Field
- Former names: Riverside Reserve
- Location: Geelong
- Coordinates: 38°09′58″S 144°21′34″E
- Operator: City of Greater Geelong
- Type: Athletics Field

John Landy Athletics Field is at the corner of Swanston Street and Barwon Terrace, South Geelong, and was formerly known as Riverside Reserve. It sits adjacent to the Barwon River to the south and the Godfrey Hirst Pty Ltd carpet factory to the east. it is considered the premier athletics venue in the Geelong region, and its track is of national standard. Landy Field is located close to Kardinia Park. Landy Field was the venue for the 2016 Victoria Country Athletics Championships. The venue itself is open 24 hours. Landy Field is an associated venue of the Geelong Cross Country Club.

== History ==
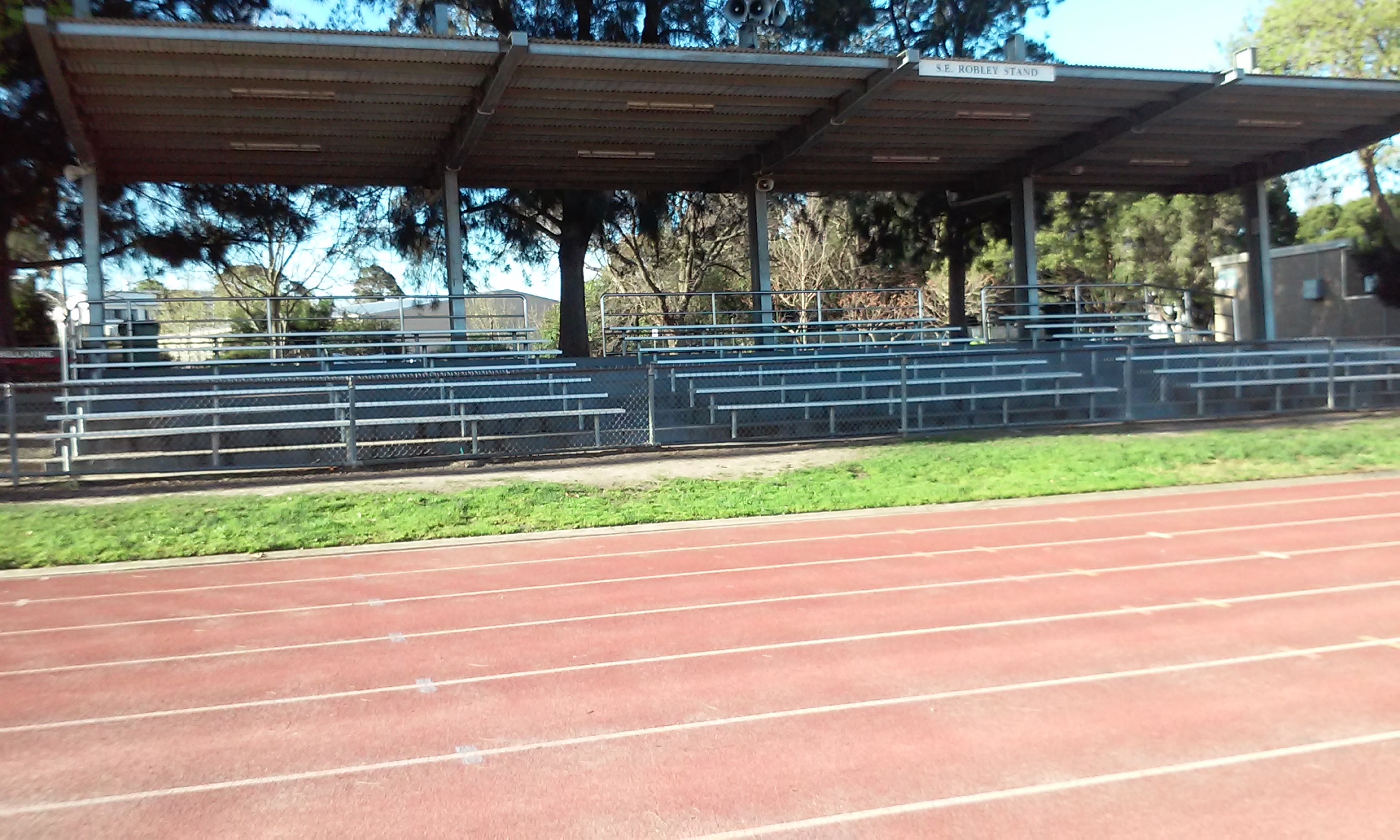
S.E. Robley Stand

Landy Field became a project of the Geelong Guild Athletic Club in the late 1950s. At the conclusion of the 1956 Melbourne Olympic Games, the Geelong City Council held a dinner on 15 January 1957 to honour the six Geelong Guild athletes (Ron Blackney, John Chittick, Robert James "Bob" Joyce, John Landy, Don MacMillan and John Vernon) who had represented Geelong and Australia at these games. During the dinner, where most of the neighbouring cities and shires were represented, John Landy made a speech on behalf of the honoured athletes, in which Landy compared overseas facilities available to athletes to those of Australia. Geelong, at that stage, had no dedicated athletic field of any kind.

To confirm a proper management structure of Landy Field (Riverside Reserve) the Geelong City Council entered into an agreement with the Geelong Guild Athletic Club Trustees: Bervin E. Purnell, president; Rudi Hochreiter Snr, secretary; Wal Whiteside, construction engineer; and Charles Harding, committee member. This agreement was confirmed on 6 January 1961 and thus allowed for the construction of Landy Field to commence.

On 16 December 2016, the Geelong Advertiser announced that Australian Olympic athlete Morgan Mitchell, among others, would run at the venue for an event that had prize money of up to A$10,000.

== Construction cost and other finances ==
Melbourne municipalities and shires contributed $2,550, while the Geelong Guild Athletic Club donated $3,989.80 towards the construction of Landy Field. Most of the Guild money came from its life savings since the club's founding on 13 July 1908.

On 15 December 2020, the Federal government announced that it had agreed to the City of Greater Geelong's selection of an upgrade to Landy Field facilities, including the changerooms, toilets, showers, hot water systems and the first aid room. Many of these facilities, excluding the first aid room, had not been upgraded since first constructed as part of the pavilion in 1979. Through the Federal government's $2.18 million grant to the City of Greater Geelong, $200,000 was allocated to Landy Field to assist the recovery from the financial impacts of the COVID-19 pandemic.

== Other facilities ==
The venue has a playground, public toilets, and an exercise station.

== Gallery ==
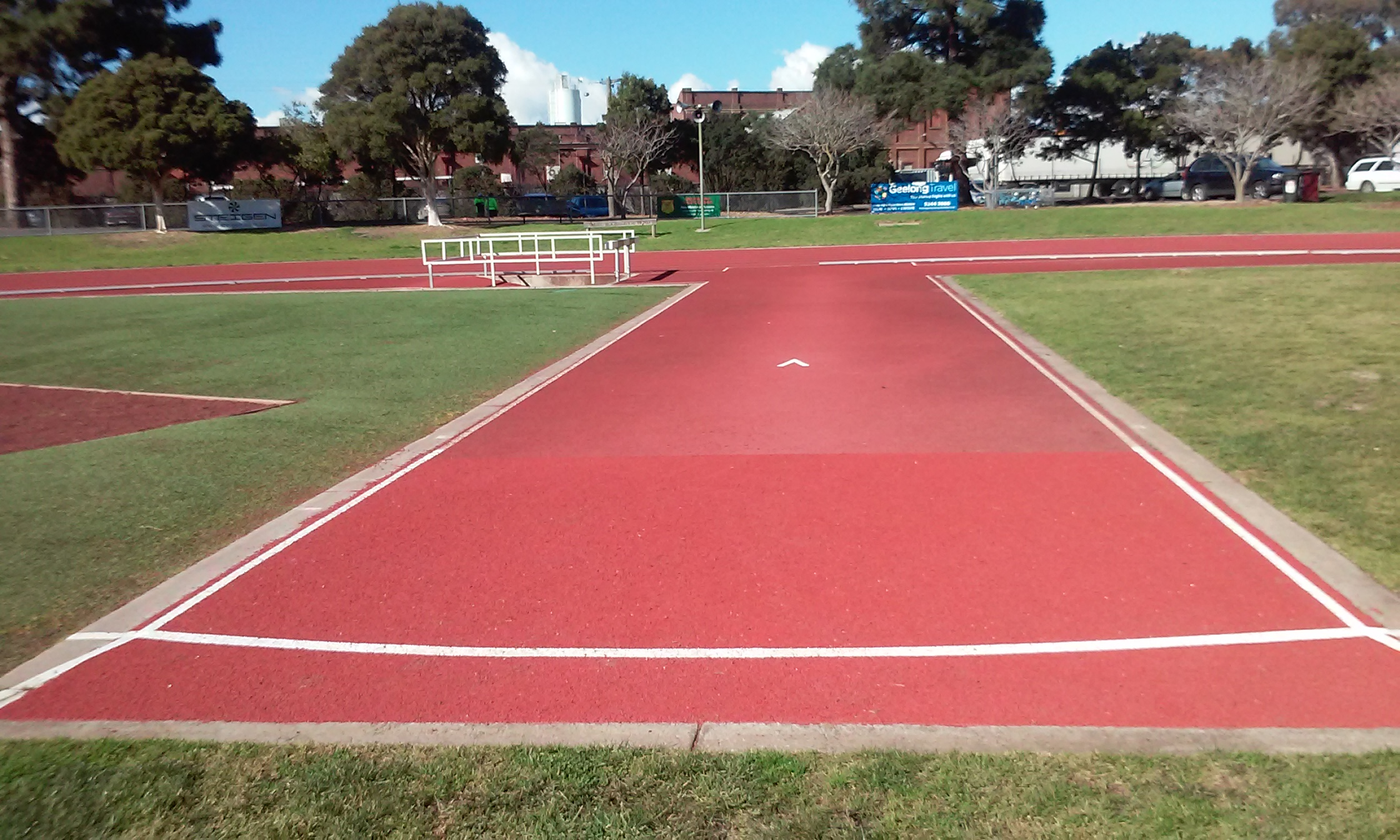
Landy Field Javelin Throw August 2017

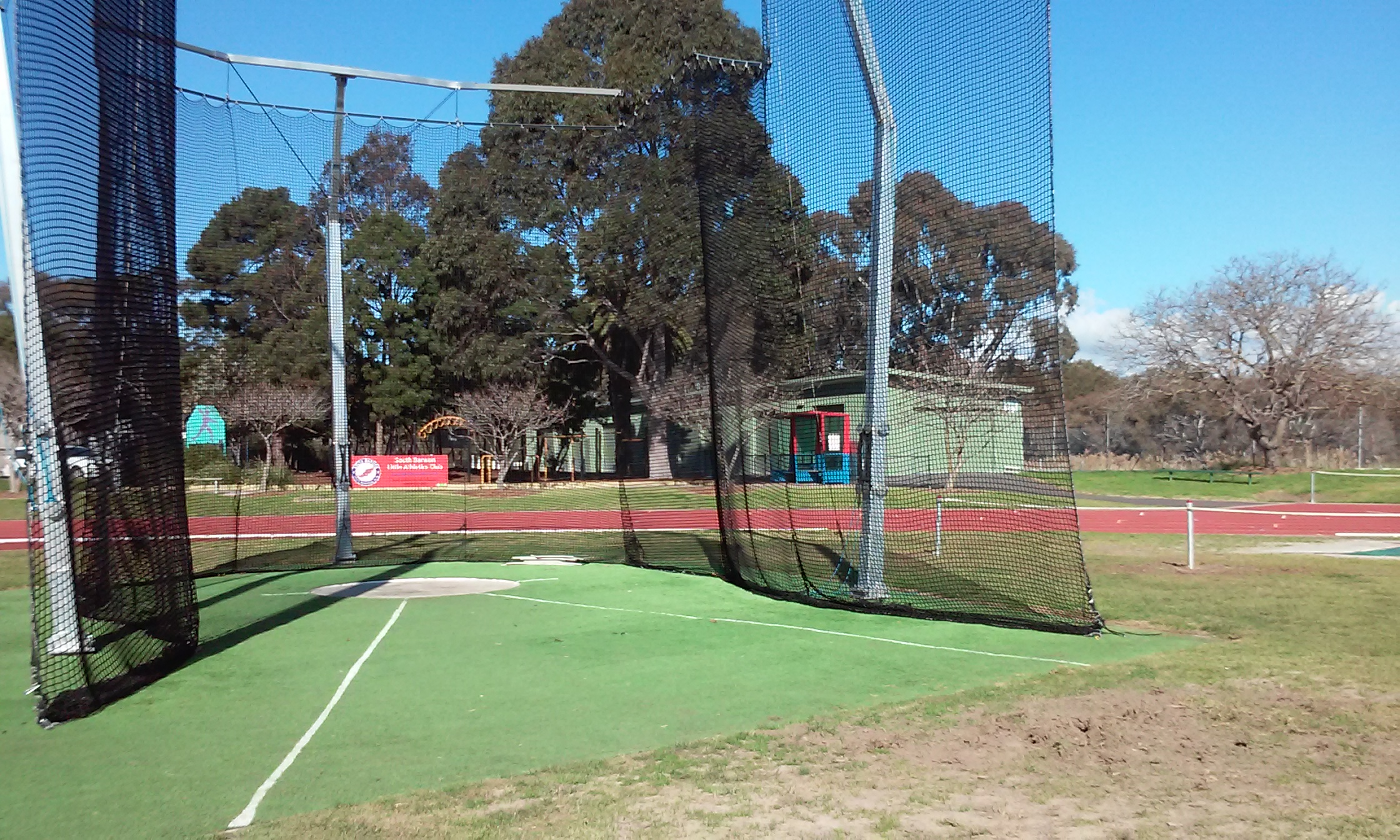
Landy Field Hammer Throw August 2017

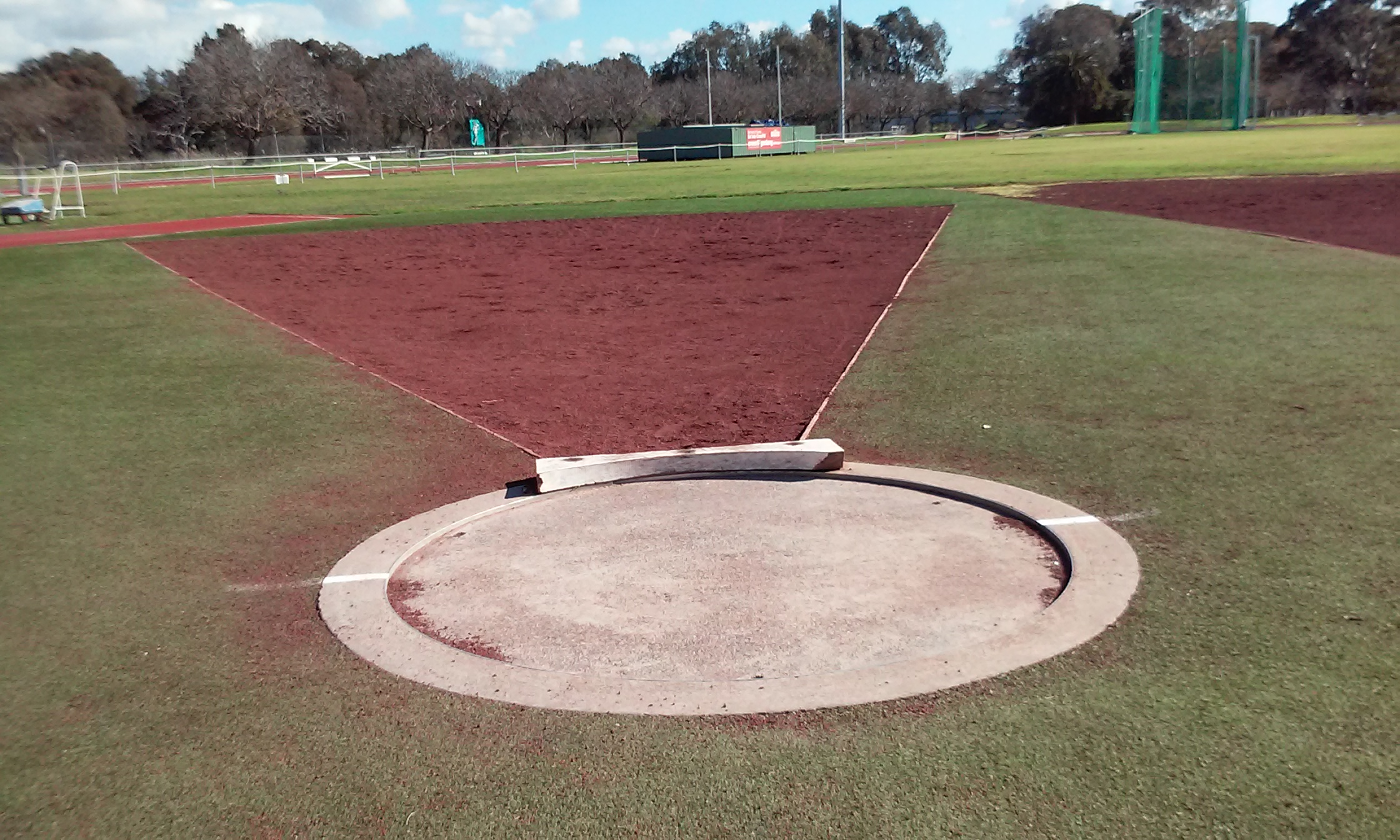
Landy Field Shot Put August 2017

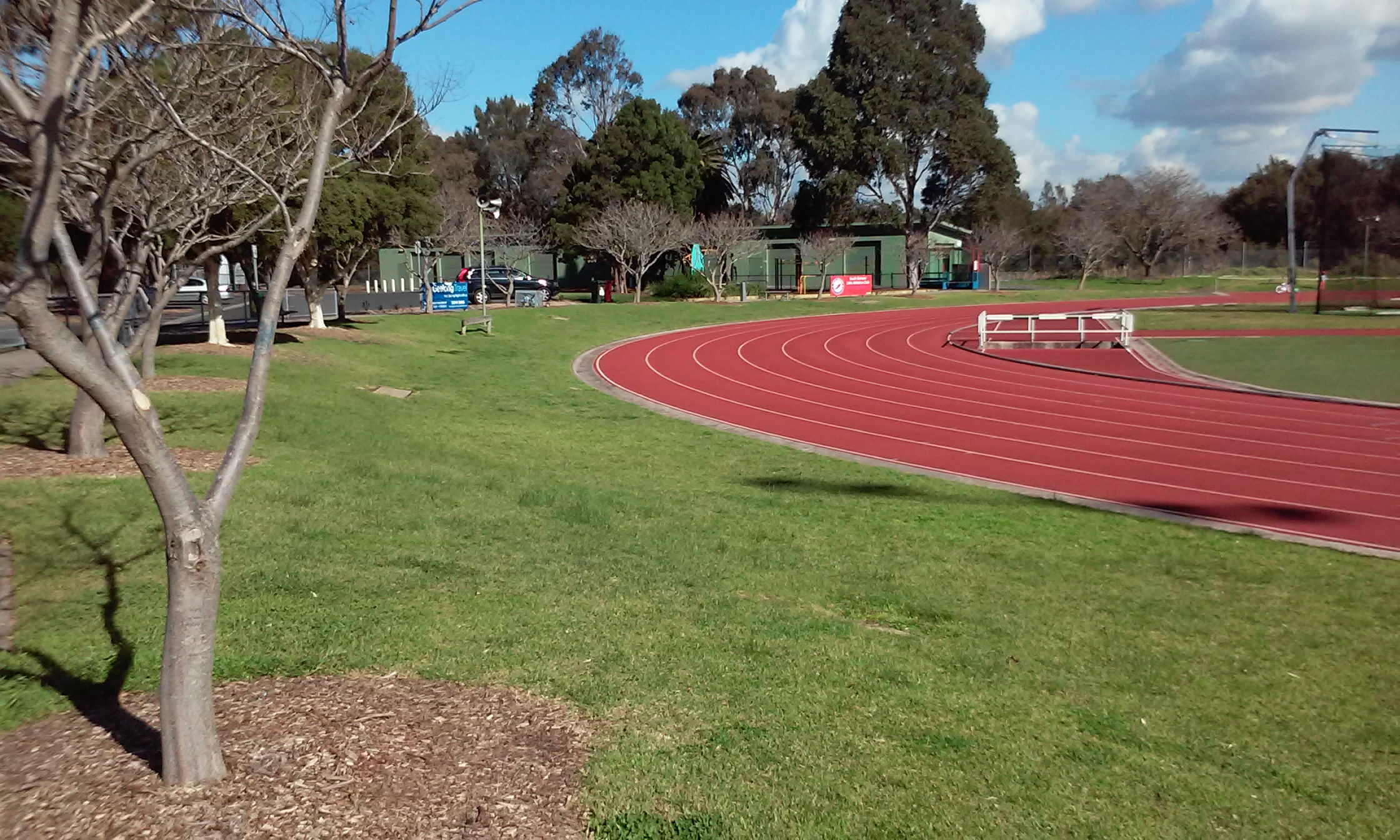
Landy Field Track August 2017

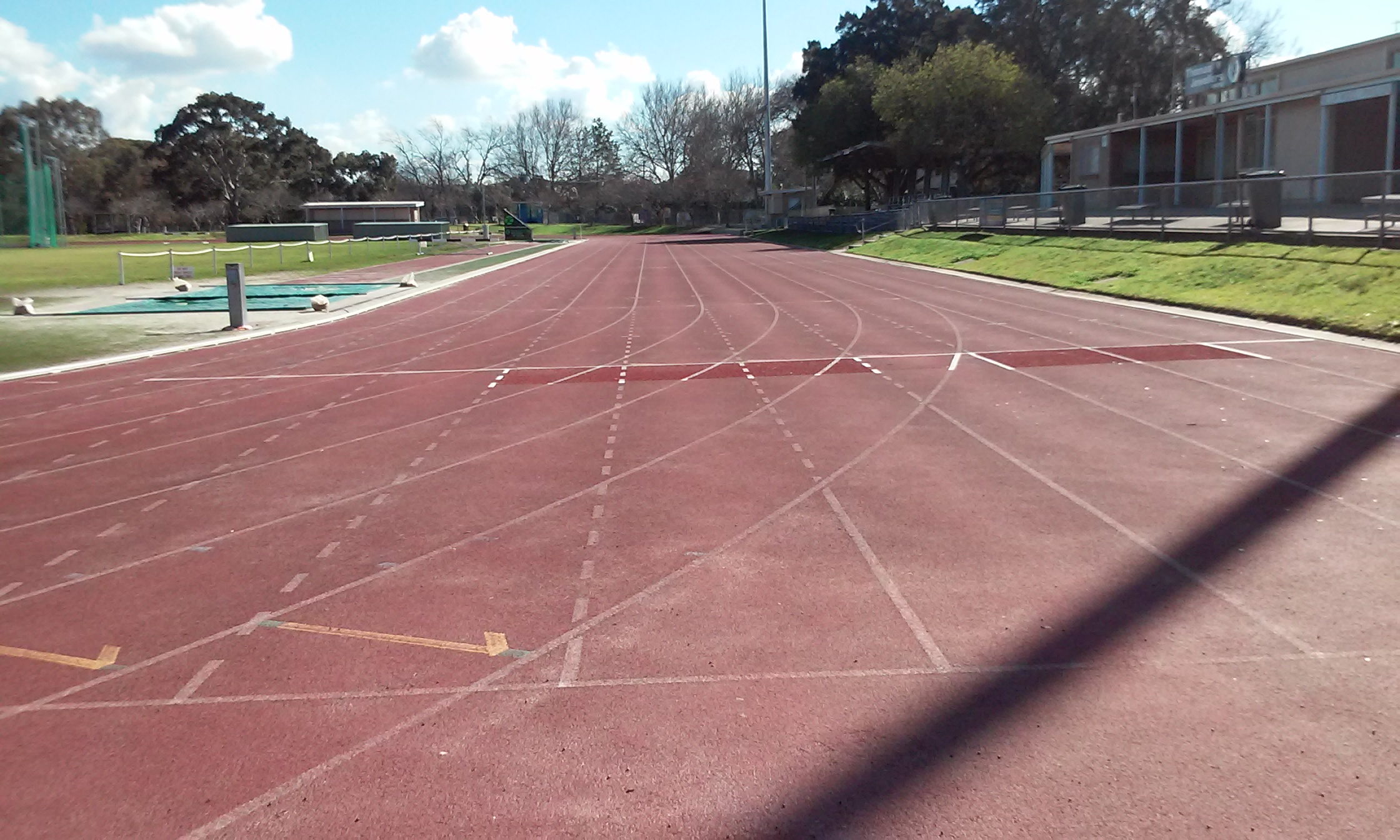
Landy Field Starting Line 100 Metres August 2017

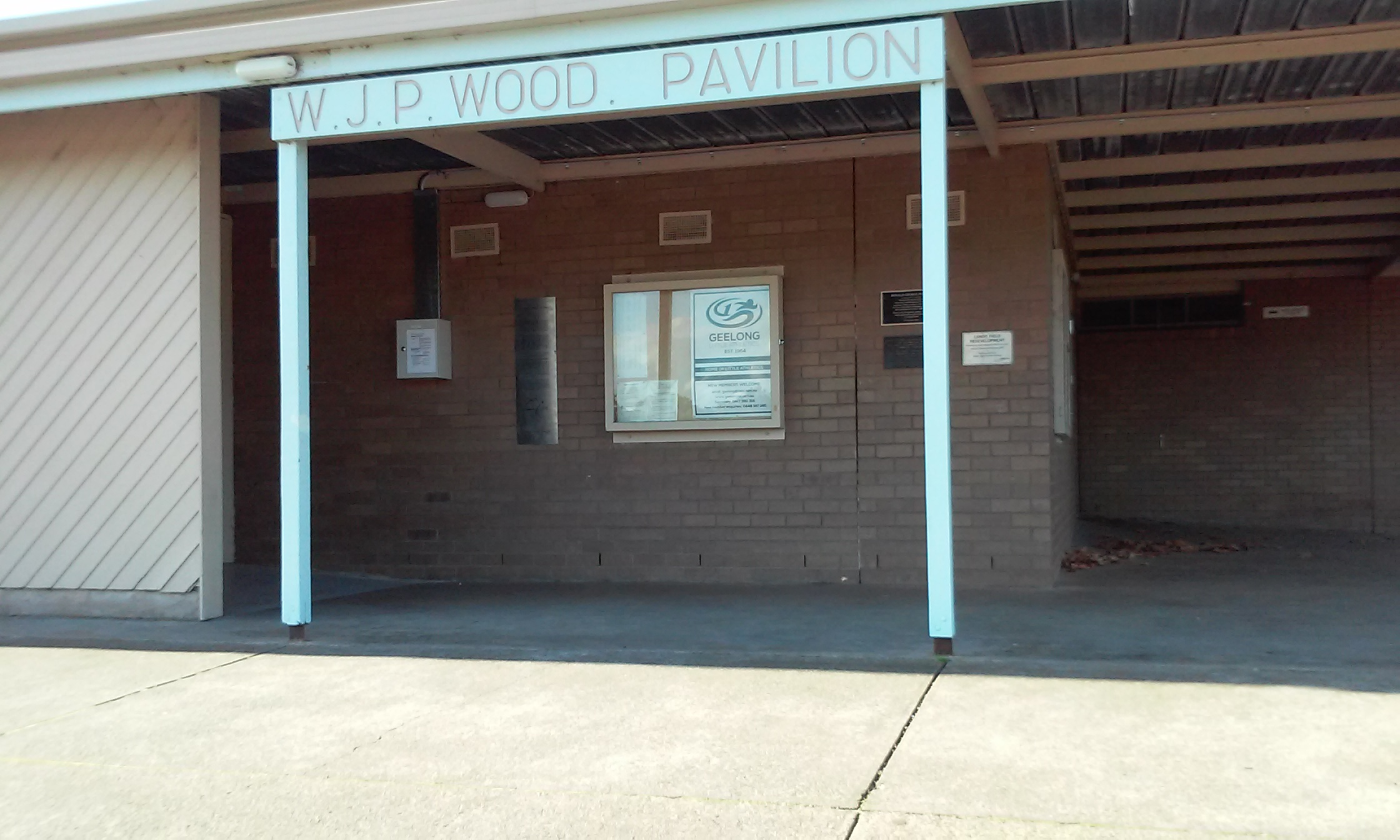
Landy Field W.J.P Wood Pavilion August 2017

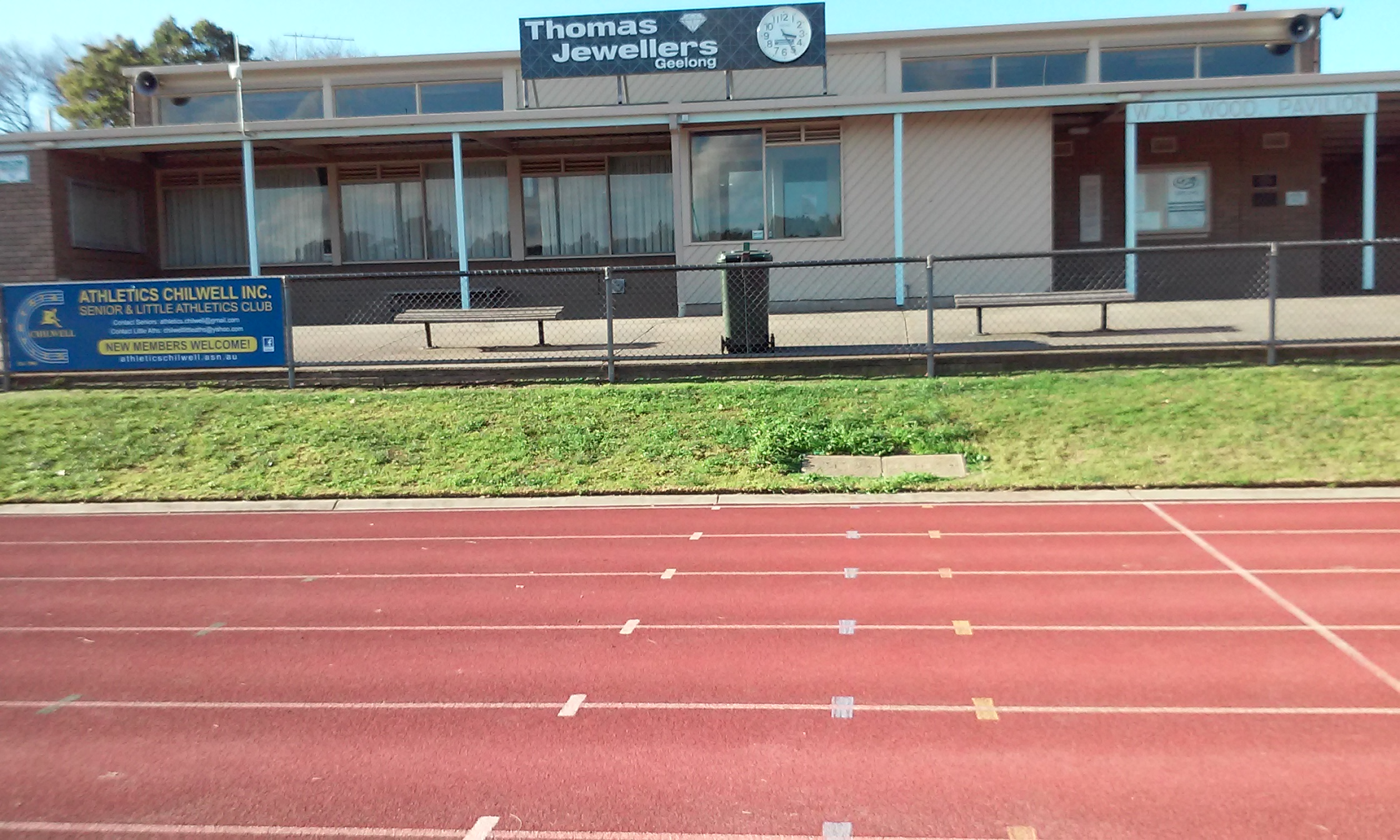
Landy Field W.J.P Wood Pavilion August 2017 2

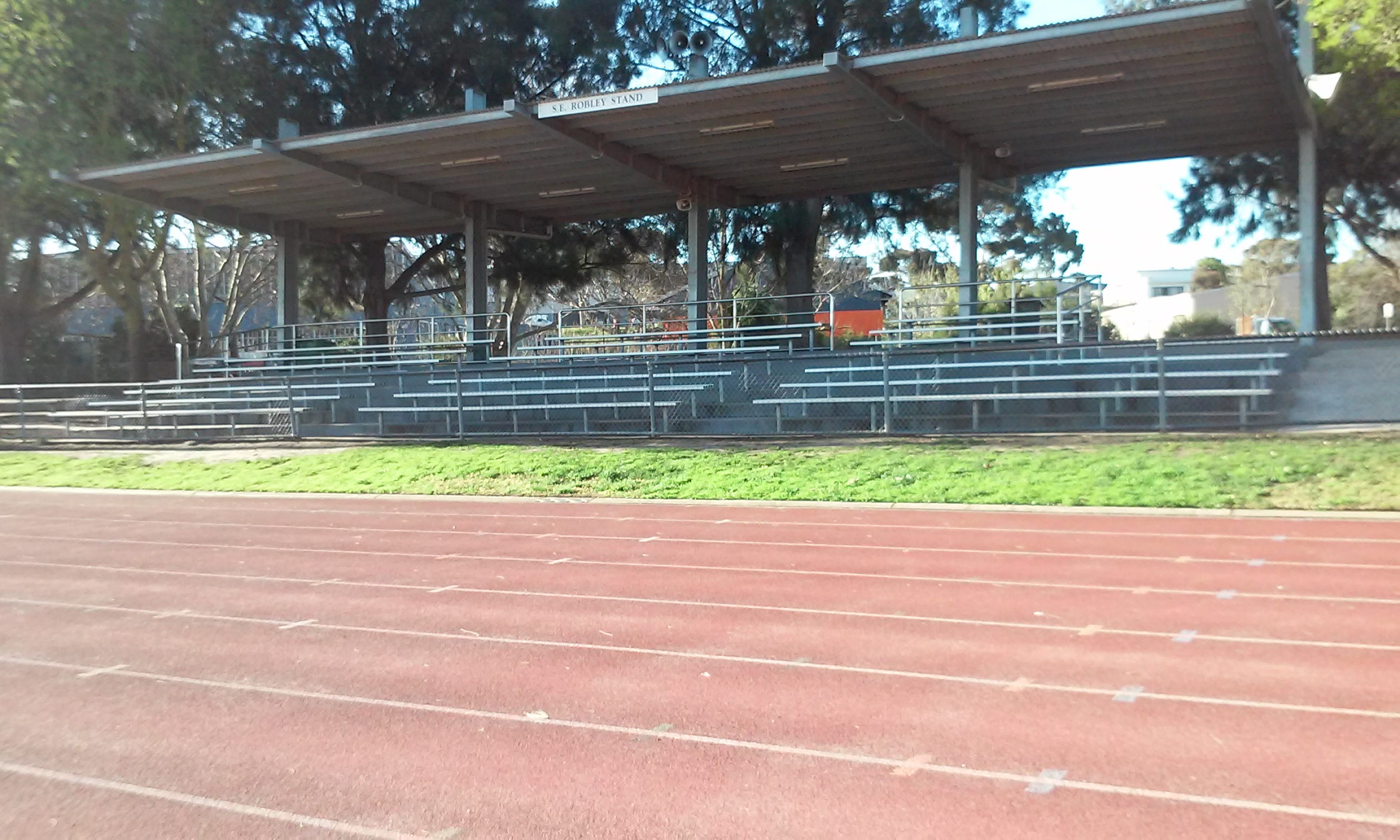
Landy Field S.E. Robley Stand August 2017

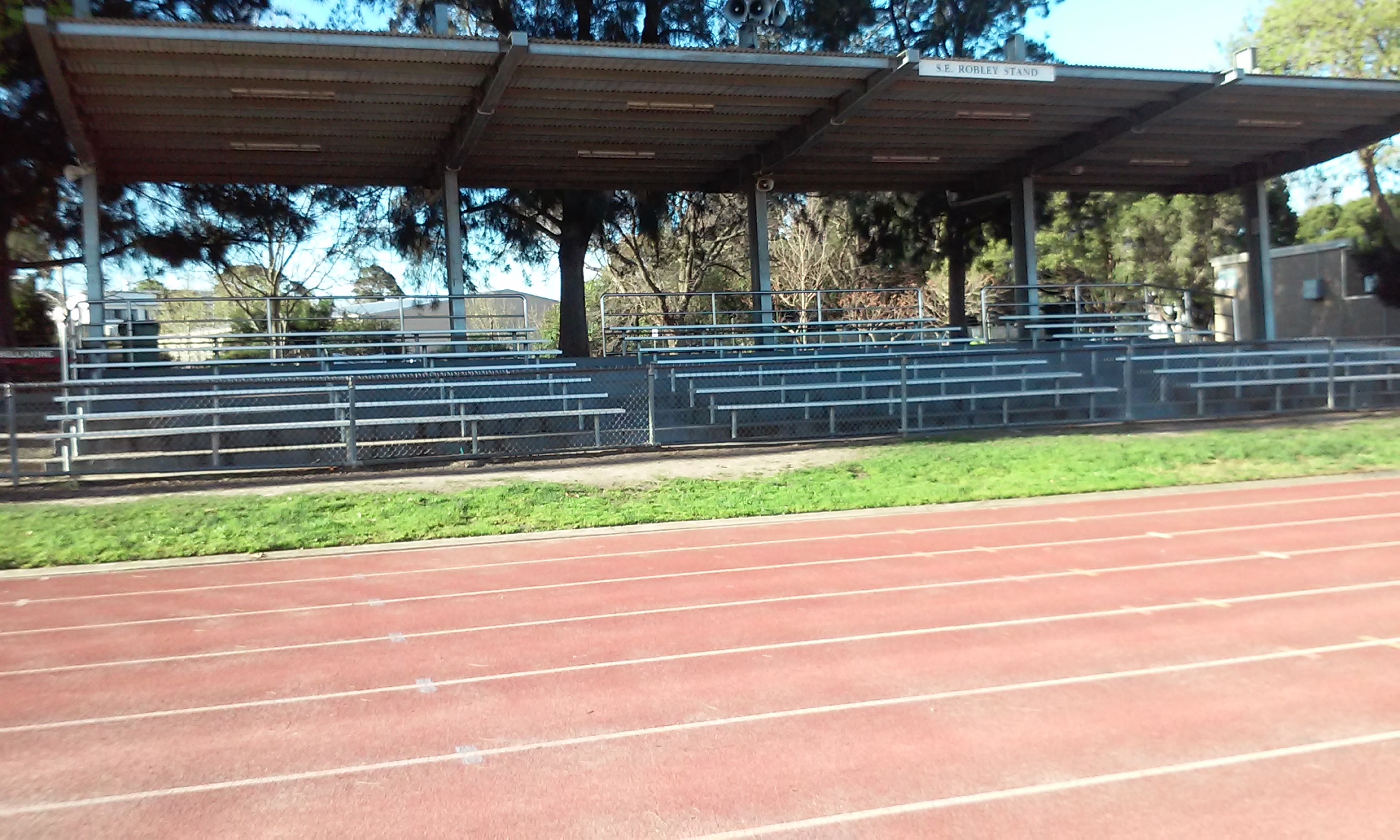
Landy Field S.E. Robley Stand August 2017

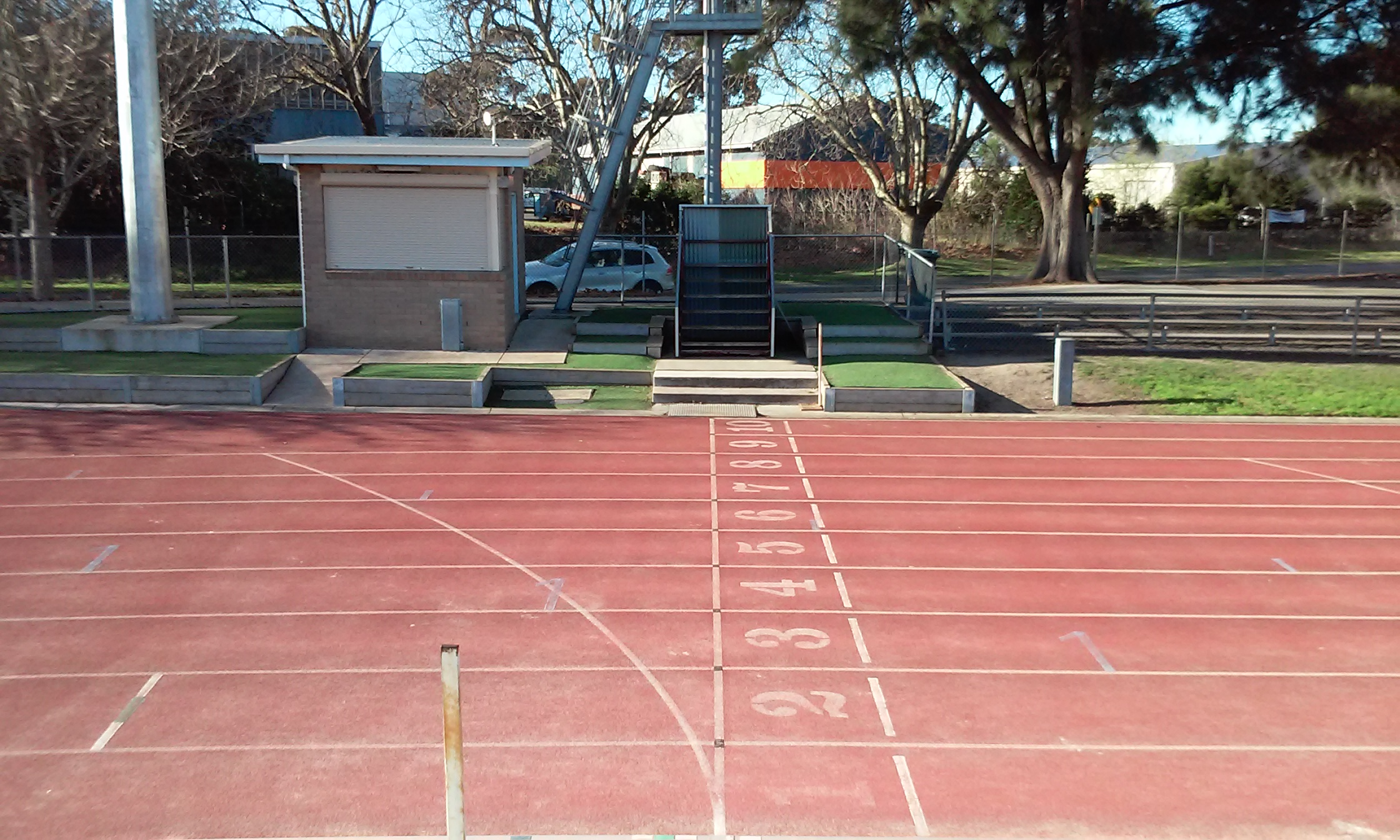
Landy Field Finish Line 100 Metres August 2017

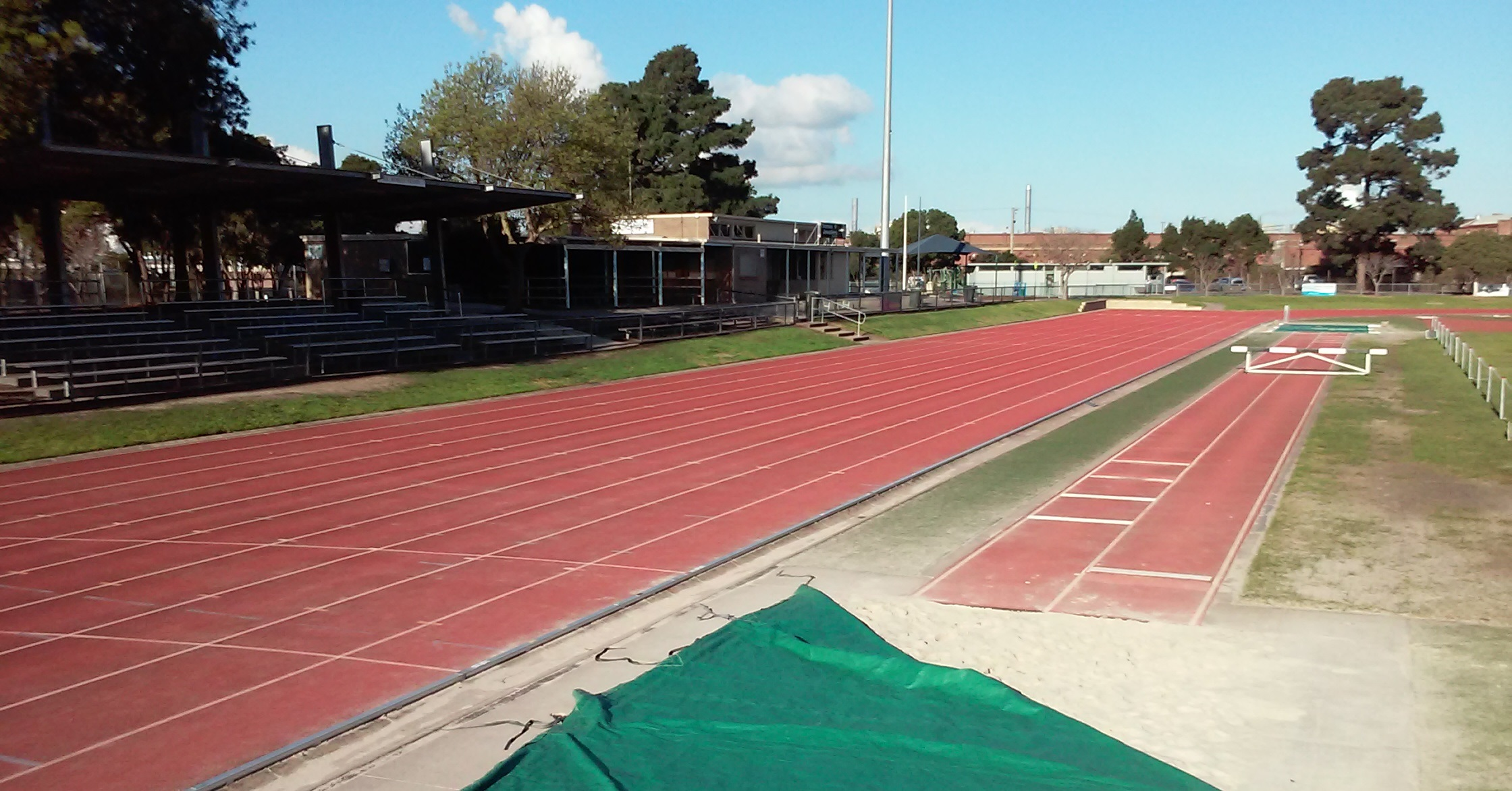
Landy Field 100 Metres August 2017

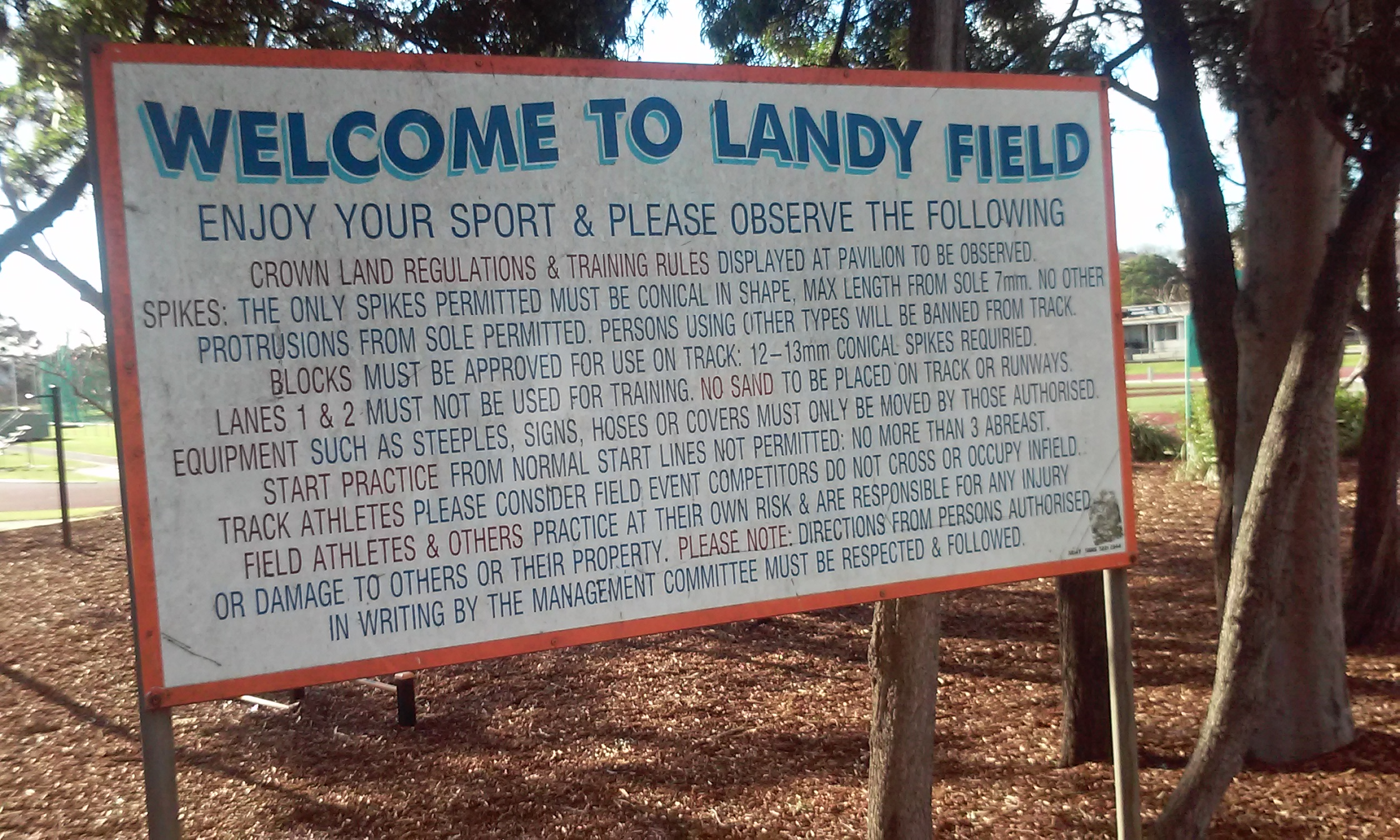
Entrance sign August 2017

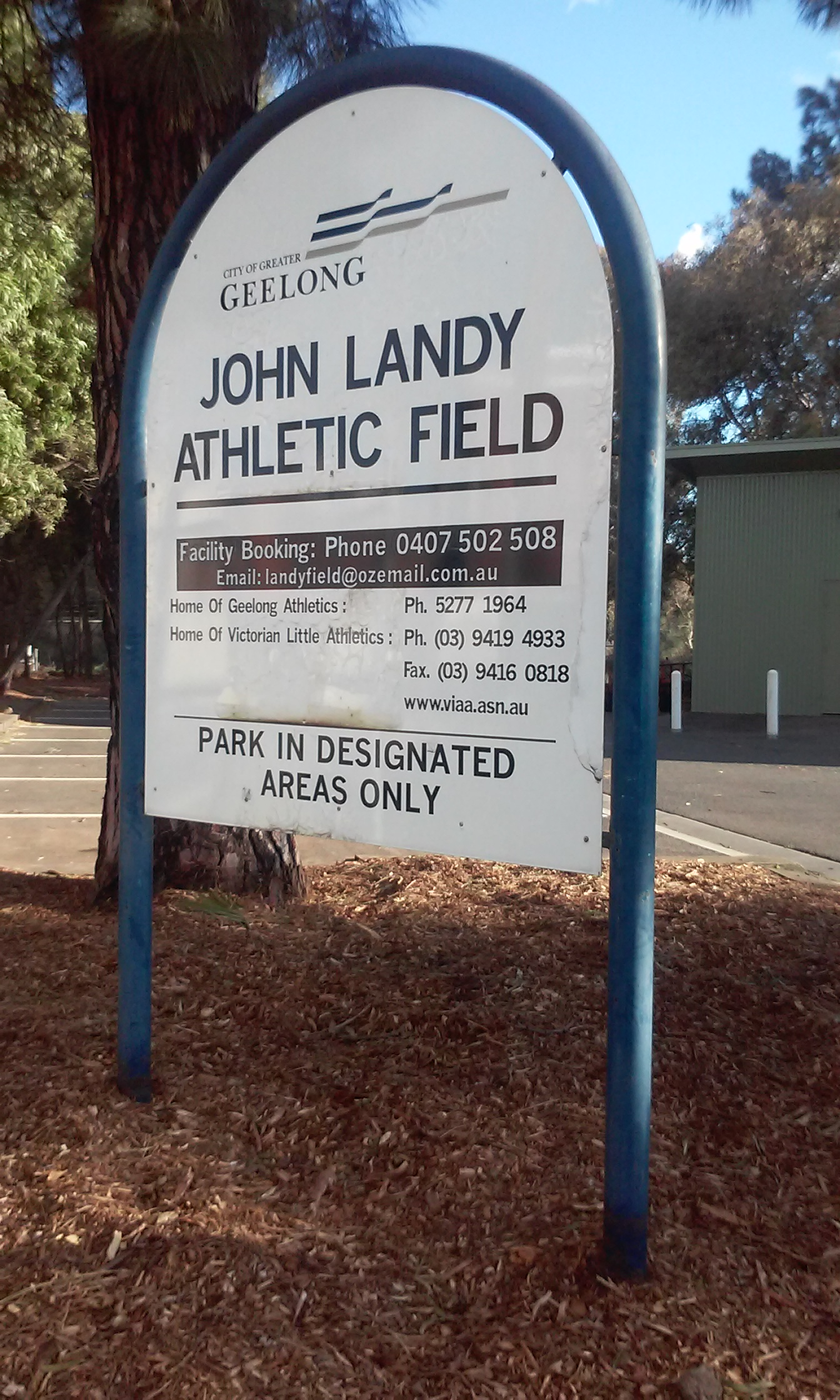
Entrance sign August 2017

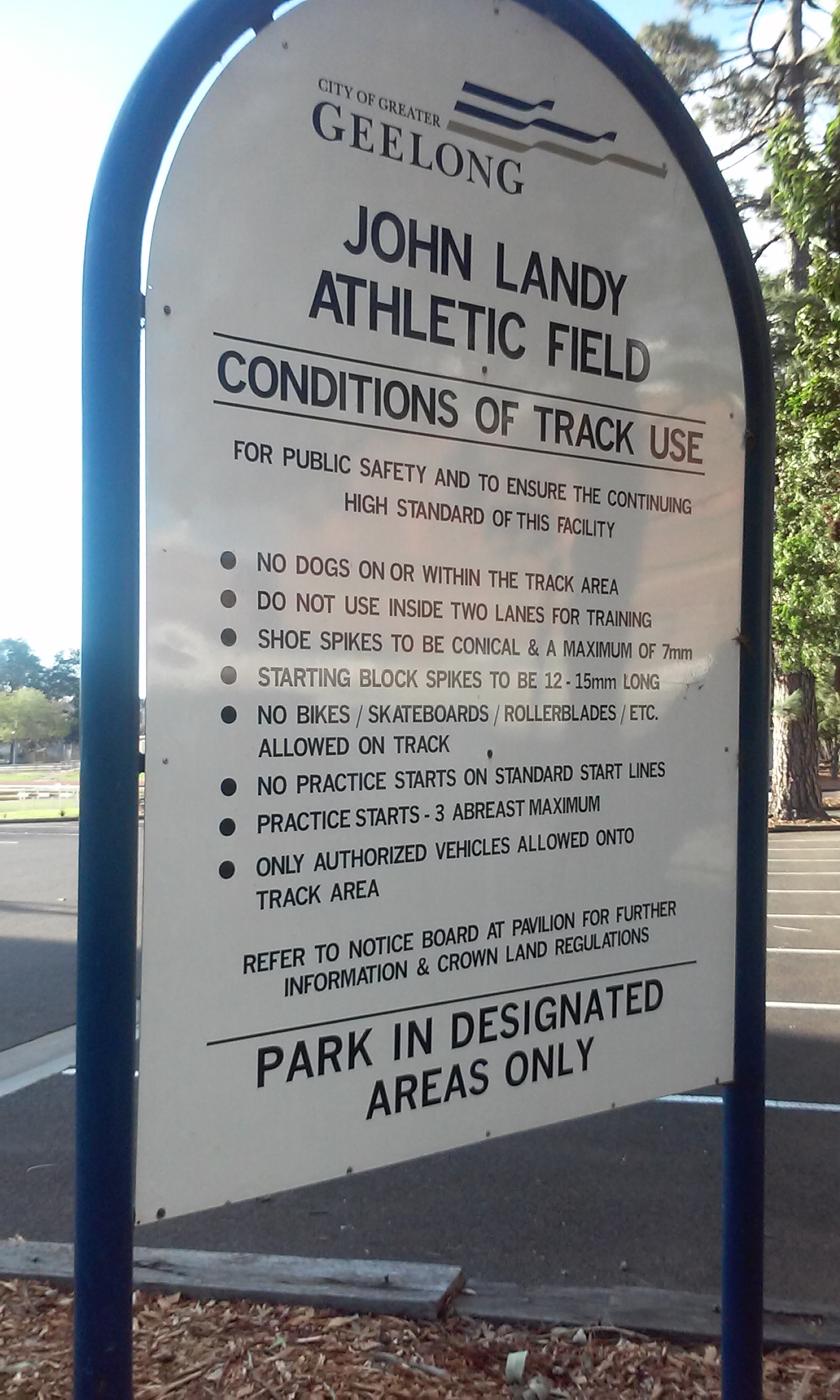
Entrance sign August 2017

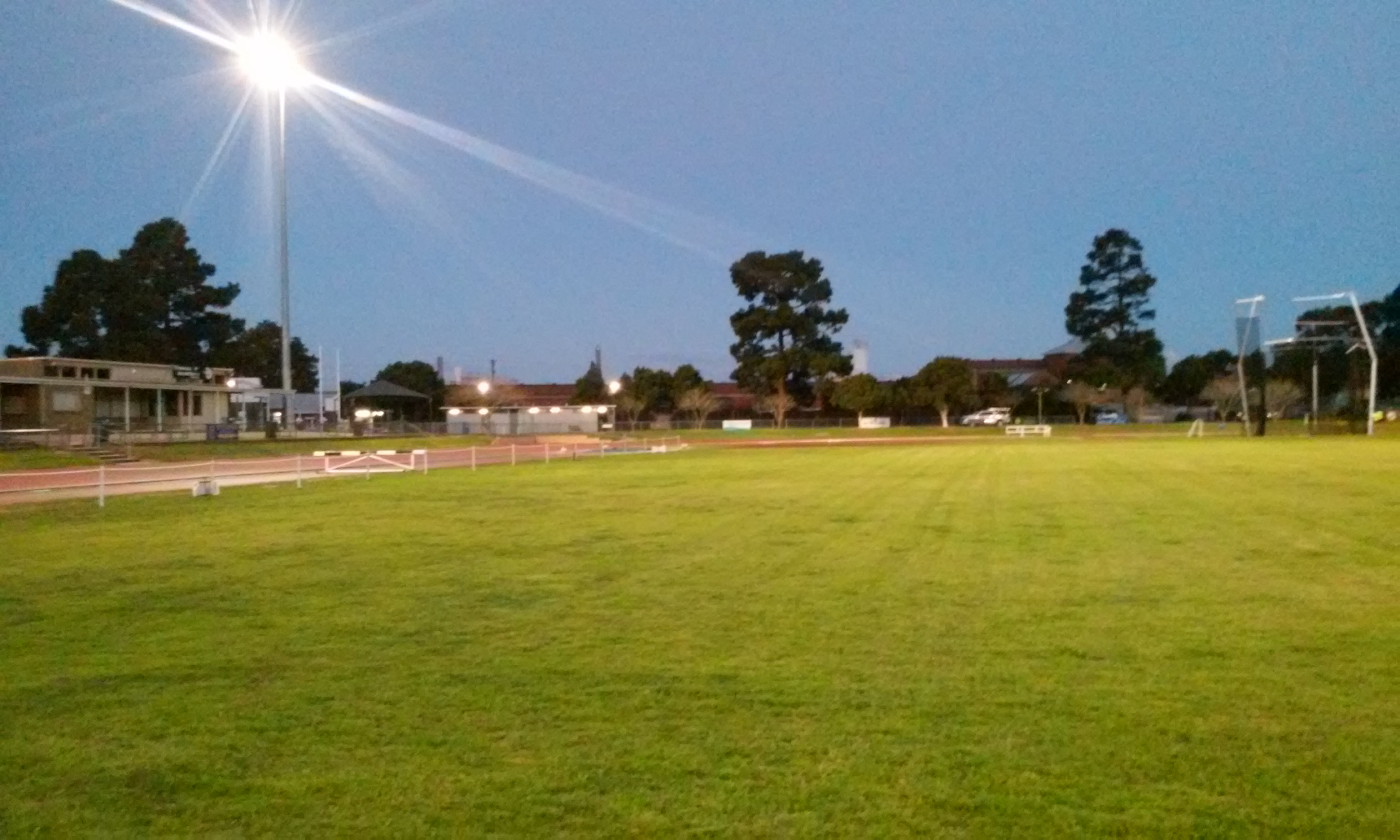
Landy Field Night Time August 2017

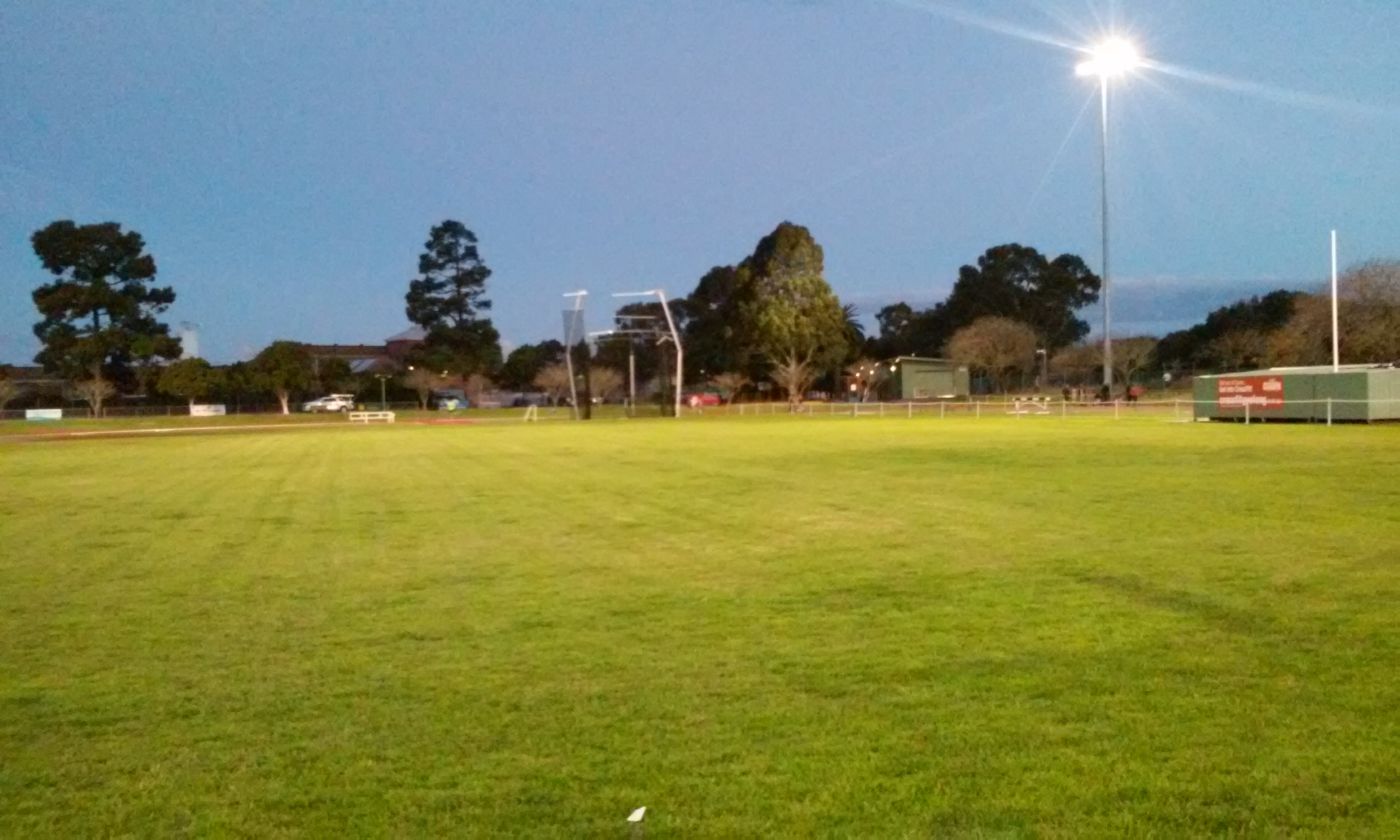
Landy Field Night Time August 2017
