= National Register of Historic Places listings in Chester County, South Carolina =

Location of Chester County in South Carolina

Chester County, South Carolina, United States, has 20 properties and districts listed on the National Register of Historic Places, and one former listing. The locations of National Register properties and districts for which the latitude and longitude coordinates are included below, may be seen in a map.

This National Park Service list is complete through NPS recent listings posted September 12, 2025.

== Current listings ==
	Name on the Register	Image	Date listed	Location	City or town	Description
1	Catholic Presbyterian Church	Catholic Presbyterian Church	May 6, 1971 (#71000762)	14 miles south of Chester on South Carolina Highway 97 and County Road 355; 34°35′56″N 81°02′07″W	Chester	
2	Chester City Hall and Opera House	Chester City Hall and Opera House	March 30, 1973 (#73001704)	Corner of West End and Columbia Sts. 34°42′11″N 81°12′47″W	Chester	
3	Chester Historic District	Chester Historic District	June 13, 1972 (#72001203)	Commercial area centered around the junction of U.S. Route 321 and South Carolina Highway 72; also roughly bounded by Hemphill Ave., Brawley, Saluda, and Foote Sts., and along Reedy St. 34°42′20″N 81°12′55″W	Chester	Second set of boundaries represents a boundary increase of March 15, 1988
4	Colvin-Fant-Durham Farm Complex	Colvin-Fant-Durham Farm Complex	July 30, 1992 (#92000961)	Eastern side of South Carolina Highway 22, approximately 1 mile west of its junction with South Carolina Highway 16; 34°34′53″N 81°15′44″W	Chester	
5	Cornwell Inn	Cornwell Inn	February 18, 1994 (#94000044)	Junction of U.S. Route 321 and South Carolina Highway 205; 34°36′27″N 81°10′42″W	Blackstock	
6	Finley High School		January 28, 2025 (#100011403)	112 Caldwell Street; 34°42′40″N 81°12′03″W	Chester	
7	Fishdam Ford	Fishdam Ford	August 14, 1973 (#73001705)	Southwest of Chester off South Carolina Highway 72; 34°35′45″N 81°25′20″W	Chester	
8	Great Falls Depot	Great Falls Depot	November 25, 1980 (#80003664)	Republic St. 34°33′43″N 80°53′36″W	Great Falls	
9	Great Falls Downtown Historic District	Great Falls Downtown Historic District	June 2, 2000 (#00000588)	Dearborn St. between Church and Republic St. 34°34′03″N 80°53′24″W	Great Falls	
10	Kumler Hall	Kumler Hall	January 27, 1983 (#83002190)	Lancaster and Cemetery Sts. 34°42′27″N 81°11′19″W	Chester	
11	Lando School	Lando School	July 1, 2009 (#09000485)	Schoolhouse Rd. 34°46′37″N 81°00′44″W	Lando	
12	Landsford Canal	Landsford Canal	December 3, 1969 (#69000163)	Off U.S. Route 21; 34°46′55″N 80°52′55″W	Rowell	
13	Landsford Plantation House	Landsford Plantation House	February 4, 1987 (#86003520)	County Road 595, ½ mile east of U.S. Route 21; 34°47′04″N 80°54′43″W	Richburg	
14	Lewis Inn	Lewis Inn	May 6, 1971 (#71000763)	Northeast of Chester off South Carolina Highway 72; 34°46′36″N 81°08′16″W	Chester	
15	McCollum Fish Weir	McCollum Fish Weir	August 28, 1974 (#74001845)	Address Restricted	Lockhart	
16	McCollum Mound	McCollum Mound	March 23, 1972 (#72001204)	Confluence of the Broad River with Turkey Creek; 34°45′39″N 81°27′08″W	Chester	Also known as "Turkey Creek Mound"
17	Mount Dearborn Military Reservation		January 16, 2018 (#100001719)	Address Restricted	Great Falls	
18	People's Free Library of South Carolina	People's Free Library of South Carolina	October 29, 1982 (#82001520)	Church St. 34°48′16″N 81°14′29″W	Lowrys	
19	James Phinney House	James Phinney House	October 11, 2016 (#16000714)	2762 Blaney Rd. 34°45′48″N 81°07′01″W	Chester	
20	Republic Theater	Republic Theater	November 26, 1980 (#80003665)	806 Dearborn St. 34°34′02″N 80°53′24″W	Great Falls	

== Former listings ==
	Name on the Register	Image	Date listed	Date removed	Location	City or town	Description
1	Elliott House		May 6, 1971 (#71000764)	August 1, 2025	North of Richburg off South Carolina Highway 901 on County Road 136; 34°43′48″N 81°01′49″W	Richburg	

== See also ==
- List of National Historic Landmarks in South Carolina
- National Register of Historic Places listings in South Carolina
