= Great Falls =

Great Falls may refer to:

== Communities ==
All located in the United States; listed alphabetically by state

- Great Falls, Montana, a city in Cascade County
- Great Falls, New Hampshire, and early name of the current city of Somersworth, New Hampshire
- Great Falls, South Carolina, a town in Chester County
- Great Falls, Virginia, a census-designated place in Fairfax County
  - Great Falls Crossing, Virginia, a census designated place in Fairfax County, Virginia

== Historic locations ==
All located in the United States

- Great Falls Depot, in Great Falls, South Carolina
- Great Falls Downtown Historic District, in Great Falls, South Carolina
- Great Falls Historic District, in Windham, Maine
- Great Falls and Old Dominion Railroad, in Northern Virginia
- Great Falls Portage, a route taken by the Lewis and Clark Expedition around the Great Falls of the Missouri River
- Great Falls station, in Great Falls, Montana
- Great Falls Tavern, in Montgomery County, Maryland
- Old Great Falls Historic District, in Paterson, New Jersey

== Sports teams ==
All based in the U.S. state of Montana

- Great Falls Americans, a junior ice hockey team
- Great Falls Americans (AWHL), a defunct junior ice hockey team active 1995–2003
- Great Falls Americans (WHL), a defunct junior ice hockey team active 1979–1980
- Great Falls Electric, a professional basketball team
- Great Falls Electrics, a defunct minor-league baseball team
- Great Falls Explorers, a defunct team in the Continental Basketball Association (CBA)
- Great Falls Voyagers, a professional baseball team

== Waterfalls ==
=== United States ===
Listed alphabetically by the associated river

- Great Falls (Catawba River), South Carolina
- Great Falls (Columbia River) or Celilo Falls, Oregon and Washington
- Great Falls (Connecticut River), New Hampshire and Vermont
- Great Falls (Housatonic River), Connecticut
- Great Falls (Missouri River), Montana
- Great Falls (Passaic River), New Jersey
- Great Falls (Potomac River), Maryland and Virginia

=== Elsewhere ===
- Akiu Great Falls, Miyagi Prefecture, Japan
- Great Falls (Hamilton, Ontario), Canada
- Hayato Great Falls, Kanagawa Prefecture, Japan
- Namekawa Great Falls, Yamagata Prefecture, Japan

== Other uses ==
All based in the U.S. state of Montana unless noted otherwise

- Great Falls Air Force Base, an early name for the current Malmstrom Air Force Base
  - Great Falls Air Defense Sector, deactivated since 1966
- Great Falls College Montana State University, a public community college
- Great Falls Dam (Manitoba), a hydroelectric dam on the Winnipeg River, Canada
- Great Falls Dam (Tennessee), a hydroelectric dam on the Caney Fork
- Great Falls International Airport, an airport in Cascade County
- Great Falls Leader, a defunct newspaper published in Great Falls
- Great Falls Park, a National Park Service (NPS) site in Fairfax County, Virginia, U.S.
- Great Falls Public Schools, a public school district
  - Great Falls Central Catholic High School
  - Great Falls High School
- Great Falls Tectonic Zone, a major intracontinental shear zone
- Great Falls Transit, a public bus service
- Great Falls Tribune, a daily morning newspaper printed in Helena
- Lake Great Falls, a prehistoric lake

== See also ==
- Big Falls (disambiguation)
