= Durham House =

Durham House may refer to:

in England

- Durham House, London
- Durham House, Northallerton in North Yorkshire

in the United States (by state)

- W. W. Durham House, Durham, California, listed on the National Register of Historic Places in Butte County, California
- Durham-Shores House, Dupont Station, Delaware, listed on the National Register of Historic Places in Kent County, Delaware
- Durham Homeplace, Watkinsville, Georgia, listed on the National Register of Historic Places in Oconee County, Georgia
- Durham House (Danville, Kentucky), listed on the National Register of Historic Places in Boyle County, Kentucky
- Durham-Perry Farmstead, Bourbonnais, Illinois, listed on the National Register of Historic Places in Kankakee County, Illinois
- Durham House (Goshen, New Hampshire), listed on the National Register of Historic Places in Sullivan County, New Hampshire
- Smith-Williams-Durham Boarding House, Hendersonville, North Carolina, listed on the National Register of Historic Places in Henderson County, North Carolina
- Durham-Jacobs House, Portland, Oregon, listed on the National Register of Historic Places in Southwest Portland, Oregon
- Colvin-Fant-Durham Farm Complex, Chester, South Carolina, listed on the National Register of Historic Places in Chester County, South Carolina
- Jay L. Durham House, Houston, Texas, listed on the National Register of Historic Places in Harris County, Texas
- E. A. Durham House, Sistersville, West Virginia, listed on the National Register of Historic Places in Tyler County, West Virginia
