= South Carolina Highway 909 =

State highway in South Carolina, United States

South Carolina Highway 909

Route information
- Maintained by SCDOT
- Length: 14.060 mi (22.627 km)
- Existed: 1940–present

Major junctions
- West end: US 321 in Lowrys
- East end: SC 9 near Richburg

Location
- Country: United States
- State: South Carolina
- Counties: Chester

Highway system
- South Carolina State Highway System; Interstate; US; State; Scenic
← SC 908	→ SC 912

South Carolina Highway 909 (SC 909) is a 14.060-mile (22.627 km) primary state highway in the U.S. state of South Carolina. It connects the communities of northern Chester County.

== Route description ==
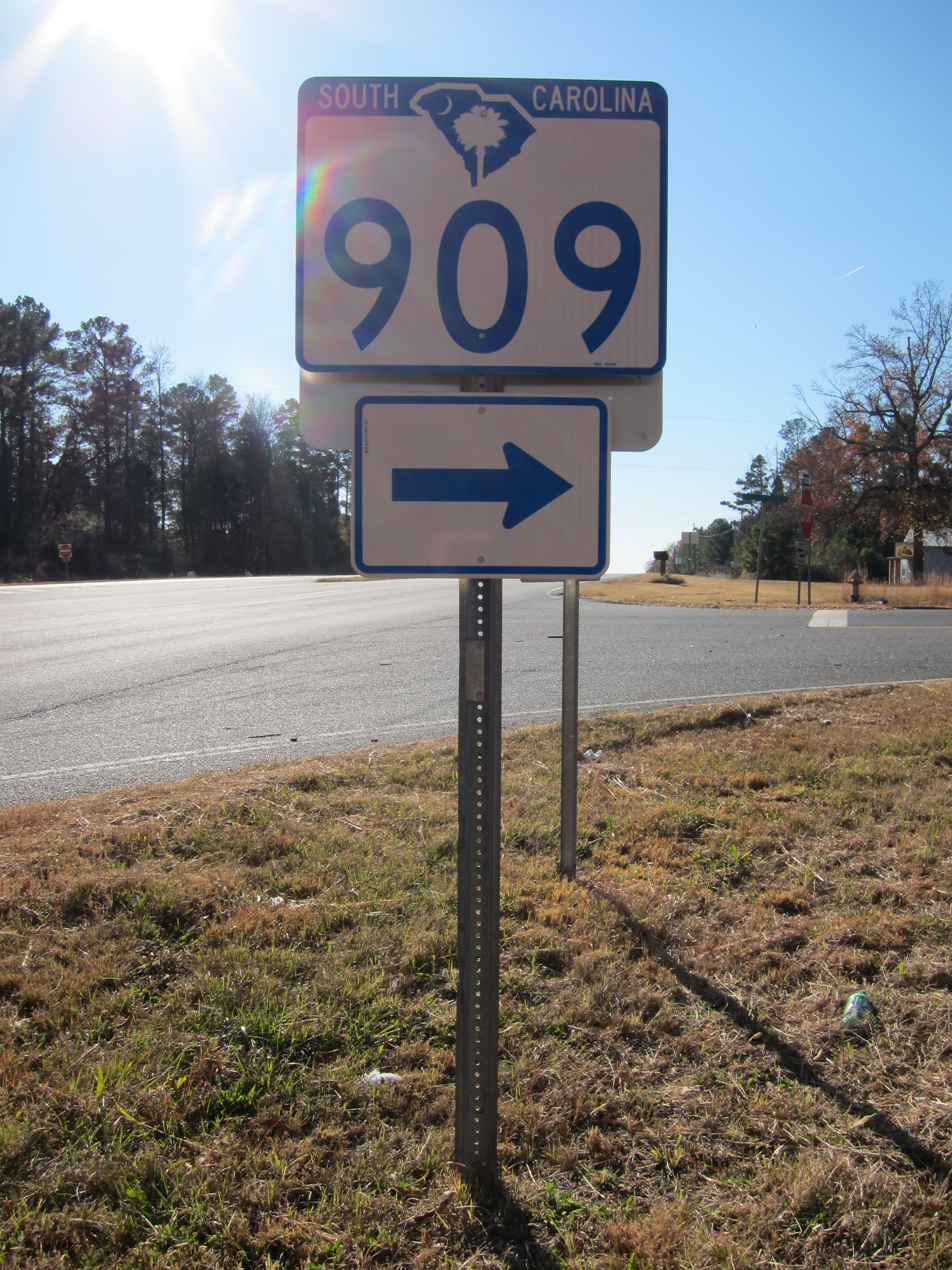
SC 909 along Lancaster Highway

SC 909 is a two-lane rural highway that traverses from U.S. Route 321 (US 321) in Lowrys to SC 9 near Richburg. The route zig-zags in northern Chester County connecting small communities, and provides access to the Chester Catawba Regional Airport.

== History ==
Established in 1940 as a new primary routing, it originally traversed from SC 9 to US 21 in Lewis. In 1941 or 1942, SC 909 was extended both directions: south, from SC 9 to the Knox community, and west from US 21 and through Lowrys to Cassels Road. In 1948, SC 909 was reverted to its original 1940 with both extensions becoming secondary roads. Around 1952, it was re-extended west to its current western terminus at US 321.

== Major intersections ==
The entire route is in Chester County.

Location	mi	km	Destinations	Notes
Lowrys	0.000	0.000	US 321 (Lowrys Highway) – Chester, York	Western terminus
Lewis	8.920	14.355	SC 72 east / SC 121 north (Saluda Road) – Rock Hill	Western end of SC 72/SC 121 concurrency
Lewis	9.020	14.516	SC 72 west / SC 121 south (Saluda Road) – Chester	Eastern end of SC 72/SC 121 concurrency
	14.060	22.627	SC 9 (Lancaster Highway) – Chester, Richburg	Eastern terminus
1.000 mi = 1.609 km; 1.000 km = 0.621 mi: Concurrency terminus
