= James Phinney House =

Historic house in South Carolina, United States

- U.S. National Register of Historic Places
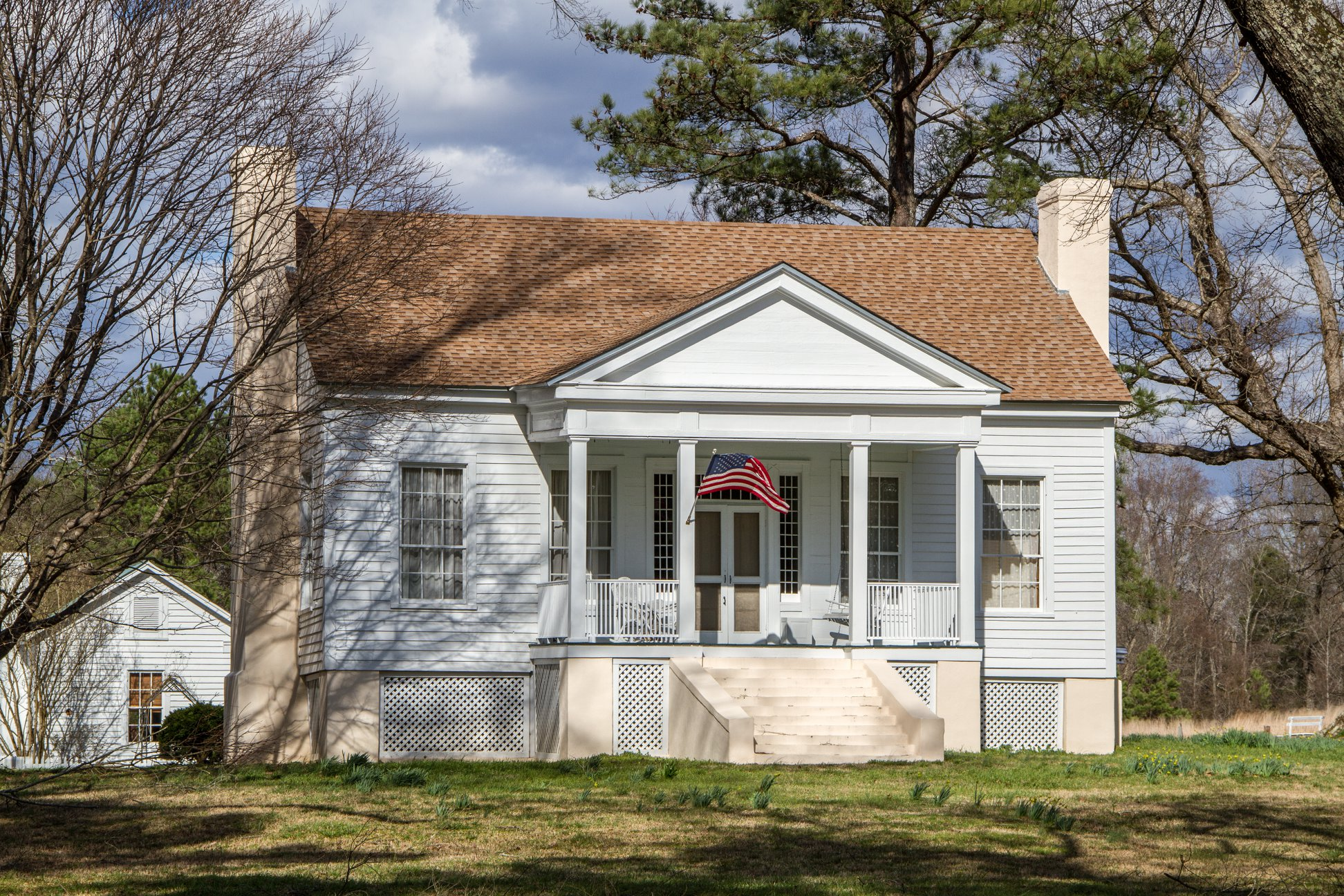

- Location within South Carolina Location within the United States
- Location: 2762 Blaney Rd., near Chester, South Carolina
- Coordinates: 34°45′48″N 81°7′1″W
- Area: 2.65 acres (1.07 ha)
- Built: c. 1856
- Architectural style: Greek Revival
- NRHP reference No.: 16000714
- Added to NRHP: October 11, 2016

The James Phinney House is a historic house northeast of the corner of Hall and Blaney Roads in rural northeastern Chester County, South Carolina. It is a 1 1/2-story clapboarded wood-frame structure with a side gable roof and end chimneys. It has a projecting gabled four-post Greek Revival portico sheltering the entrance, which is framed by sidelight and transom windows. The house was built about 1856, and is a well-preserved example of rural domestic Greek Revival architecture, a form that is not particularly common in the state.

The house was listed on the National Register of Historic Places in 2016.

== See also ==
- National Register of Historic Places listings in Chester County, South Carolina
