= KDCM =

KDCM may refer to:

- KDCM, the ICAO airport code for Chester Catawba Regional Airport, South Carolina, United States
- KDCM, the Kolkata Metro station code for Dum Dum Cantonment metro station, West Bengal, India
