= Chester County Airport =

Chester County Airport may refer to:

- Chester County G. O. Carlson Airport, in Coatesville, Pennsylvania
- Chester Regional Airport, near Chester, South Carolina
