= Big Falls =

Big Falls may refer to a location:

== United States ==
- Big Falls, a waterfall in Idaho
- Big Falls, Minnesota, a city
- Big Falls (Missouri River waterfall), near Great Falls, Montana
- Big Falls, a waterfall on the Elk River (North Carolina–Tennessee)
- Big Falls (Oregon), a waterfall near Terrebonne
- Big Falls, Rusk County, Wisconsin, a town
- Big Falls, Waupaca County, Wisconsin, a village

== Other countries ==
- Big Falls, Belize, a village in Toledo District
- Several waterfalls in Nova Scotia, Canada

== See also ==
- Great Falls (disambiguation)
