= Republic Theater =

Republic Theater or Republic Theatre may refer to:

- Republic Theater (South Carolina)
- New Victory Theater (Manhattan), formerly Republic Theatre
- Follies Theater (Los Angeles), formerly Republic Theater
