= Lowrys, South Carolina =

- Town
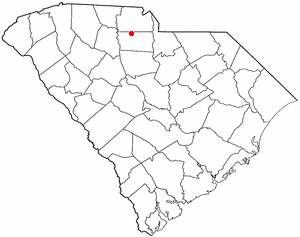
- Location of Lowrys, South Carolina
- Coordinates: 34°48′15″N 81°14′46″W
- Country: United States
- State: South Carolina
- County: Chester

Area
  - Total: 3.16 sq mi (8.19 km^{2})
  - Land: 3.16 sq mi (8.19 km^{2})
  - Water: 0 sq mi (0.00 km^{2})
- Elevation: 719 ft (219 m)

Population (2020)
  - Total: 184
  - Density: 58.2/sq mi (22.48/km^{2})
- Time zone: UTC-5 (Eastern (EST))
  - Summer (DST): UTC-4 (EDT)
- ZIP code: 29706
- Area code: 803
- FIPS code: 45-42865
- GNIS feature ID: 2406053
- Website: www.townoflowrys.org

Lowrys is a small rural town in Chester County, South Carolina, United States. As of the 2020 census, Lowrys had a population of 184.

== History ==
The People's Free Library of South Carolina was listed on the National Register of Historic Places in 1982.

== Geography ==
Lowrys is located near the northern border of Chester County. U.S. Route 321 passes through the western side of the town, leading north 15 miles (24 km) to York and south 8 miles (13 km) to Chester. South Carolina Highway 909 (Old York Road) passes through the center of Lowrys and leads southeast 2.5 miles (4.0 km) to Chester Catawba Regional Airport.

According to the United States Census Bureau, the town has a total area of 3.2 square miles (8.2 km^{2}), all of it land.

== Demographics ==
Historical population
Census	Pop.	Note	%±
1910	343		—
1920	194		−43.4%
1930	208		7.2%
1940	315		51.4%
1950	368		16.8%
1960	298		−19.0%
1970	260		−12.8%
1980	225		−13.5%
1990	200		−11.1%
2000	207		3.5%
2010	200		−3.4%
2020	184		−8.0%
U.S. Decennial Census

As of the census of 2020, there were 259 people, 90 households, and 70 families residing in the town. The population density was 65.5 inhabitants per square mile (25.3/km^{2}). There were 84 housing units at an average density of 26.6 per square mile (10.3/km^{2}). The racial makeup of the town was 67.63% White, 31.88% African American and 0.48% Native American. Hispanic or Latino of any race were 0.48% of the population.

There were 76 households, out of which 32.9% had children under the age of 18 living with them, 55.3% were married couples living together, 15.8% had a female householder with no husband present, and 21.1% were non-families. 17.1% of all households were made up of individuals, and 7.9% had someone living alone who was 65 years of age or older. The average household size was 2.72 and the average family size was 3.12.

In the town, the population was spread out, with 25.6% under the age of 18, 6.8% from 18 to 24, 27.5% from 25 to 44, 26.1% from 45 to 64, and 14.0% who were 65 years of age or older. The median age was 36 years. For every 100 females, there were 84.8 males. For every 100 females age 18 and over, there were 90.1 males.

The median income for a household in the town was $43,750, and the median income for a family was $55,833. Males had a median income of $46,667 versus $21,250 for females. The per capita income for the town was $16,652. About 3.8% of families and 5.7% of the population were below the poverty line, including 6.2% of those under the age of eighteen and 11.8% of those 65 or over.
