= John P. Gaston =

American politician

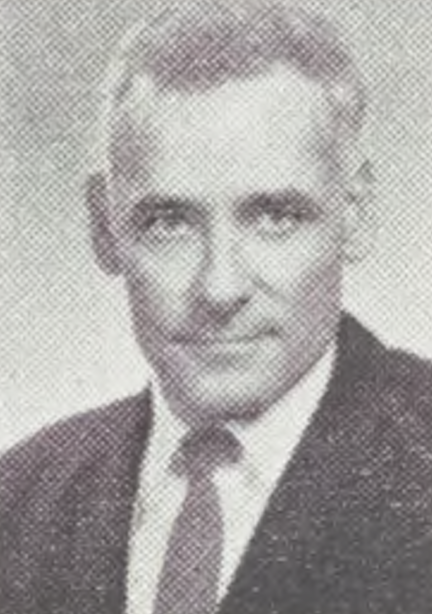
- Gaston in 1971

Member of the South Carolina House of Representatives from Chester County
- In office 1971–1974

Personal details
- Born: John Porter Gaston Jr. June 22, 1930 Richburg, South Carolina, U.S.
- Died: January 14, 2013 (aged 82) Lancaster, South Carolina, U.S.
- Party: Democratic

John Porter Gaston Jr. (June 22, 1930 – January 14, 2013) was an American politician. A member of the Democratic Party, he served in the South Carolina House of Representatives from 1971 to 1974.

== Life and career ==
Gaston was born in Richburg, South Carolina, the son of John Porter Gaston Sr. and Mary Rebecca Saye. He attended Lewisville High School, graduating in 1947. After graduating, he attended Clemson University, but did not graduate. He was a dairy farmer.

Gaston served in the South Carolina House of Representatives from 1971 to 1974.

== Death ==
Gaston died on January 14, 2013, at the White Oak Manor in Lancaster, South Carolina, at the age of 82.
