= Great Falls (Catawba River) =

Coordinates: 34°34′45″N 80°52′40″W

Great Falls of the Catawba
- Interactive map of Great Falls of the Catawba
- Location: Chester County / Lancaster County, South Carolina, USA
- Type: cascade
- Total height: 121 ft (37 m)

The Great Falls of the Catawba River mark the point at which the river encounters a series of rapids while coursing across the Piedmont Plateau on the border of Lancaster County, South Carolina, and Chester County, South Carolina, near the town of Great Falls. The Great Falls are located about 55 miles south of Charlotte.

Prior to the creation of the Fishing Creek Reservoir and other artificial lakes by Duke Power, the falls were a major landmark on the river. The rapids could be heard from long distances away, while a major pre-Columbian trading path ran near the left bank.

Historically the Great Falls of the Catawba were approximately 4 miles long, with a total elevation drop of 121 feet. (The word "falls" was an 18th-century appellation, when any river rapids and vertical waterfalls alike were both referred to as falls.) The creation of the dams at Great Falls, South Carolina has resulted in the top two miles of it being completely dry (dewatered) except during times of very high flow. The bottom portion of historical Great Falls is drowned by Cedar Creek dam, another hydroelectric project. As of 2006, interest groups have formed in the Carolinas to restore the Great Falls by altering the dam and restoring flow to the dewatered stretch of Great Falls as part of a major restoration project of the Catawba River. As of 2007, a new licensing arrangement has been agreed to by Duke Energy and several interested parties.

Below the Great Falls, the river flows into Lake Wateree where it becomes the Wateree River.
