= Elliott House (Richburg, South Carolina) =

Historic house in South Carolina, United States

- Formerly listed on the U.S. National Register of Historic Places
- Location within South Carolina Location within the United States
- Location: North of Richburg off South Carolina Highway 901 on County Road 136, near Richburg, South Carolina
- Coordinates: 34°43′48″N 81°1′49″W
- Area: 2.1 acres (0.85 ha)
- Built: c. 1770
- Architectural style: Log House
- NRHP reference No.: 71000764

Significant dates
- Added to NRHP: May 6, 1971
- Removed from NRHP: August 1, 2025

Elliott House, also known as Chester County Log Cabin, is a historic home located near Richburg, Chester County, South Carolina. It was built about 1770, and is a two-story, late 18th to early 19th century log dwelling. The house features a tall shed-roofed porch across the front, a steeply pitched gable roof, an end chimney, stone piers, and dovetailed log joints. The interior floors and ceilings are original heart pine.

It was listed on the National Register of Historic Places in 1971, and was delisted in 2025.
