= Big Falls (Missouri River waterfall) =

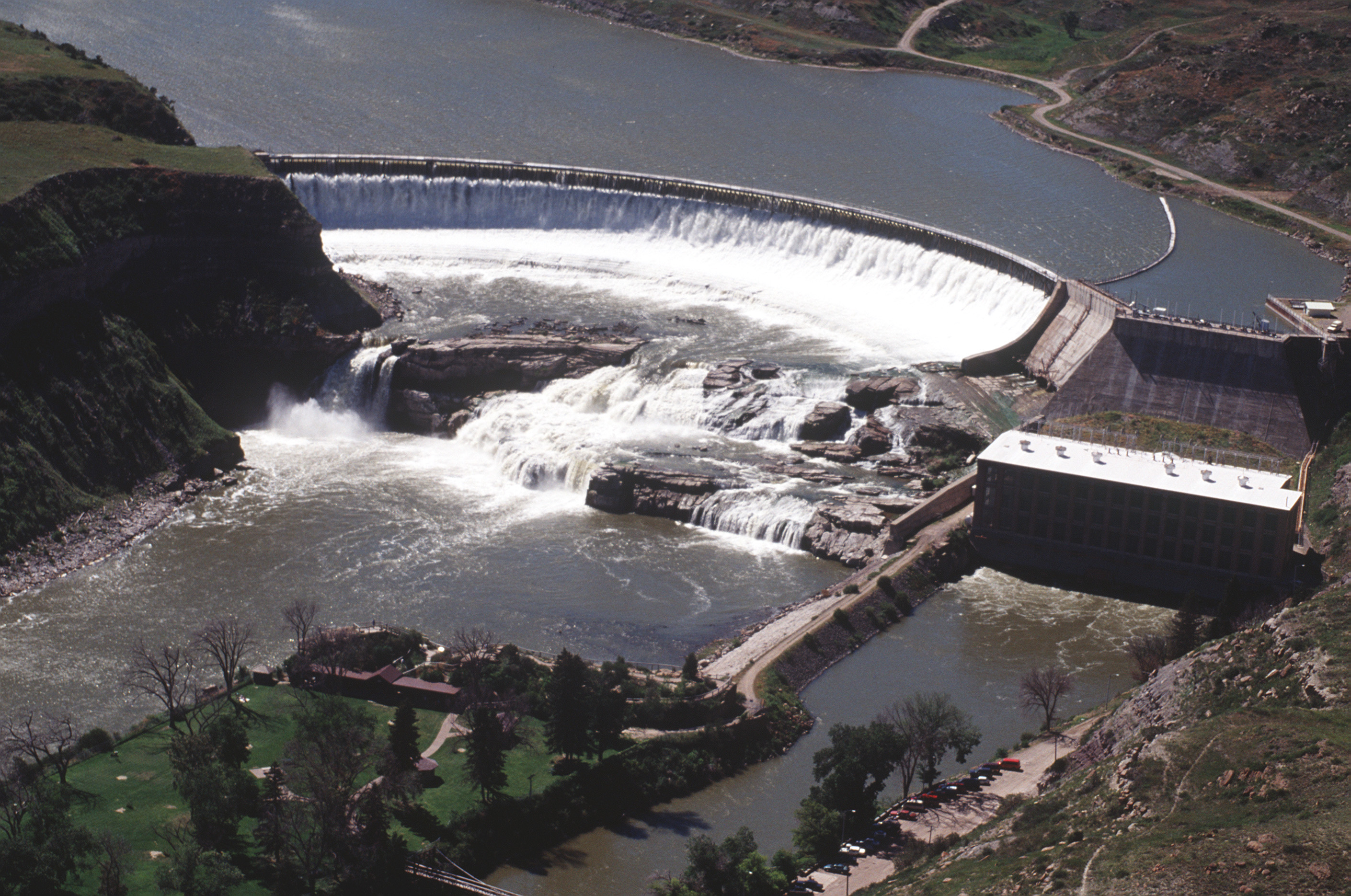
- Big Falls and Ryan Dam

- Location within Montana
- Location: Near Great Falls, Montana
- Coordinates: 47°34′07″N 111°07′27″W
- Type: Segmented block
- Total height: 87 ft (27 m)
- Number of drops: 1
- Total width: 900 ft (270 m)
- Watercourse: Missouri River
- Average flow rate: 8,500 cu ft/s (240 m^{3}/s)

Big Falls (also called Great Falls or Roar of Steam) is a major waterfall located on the Missouri River in western Montana in the United States. It is the lowermost and largest of the Great Falls of the Missouri, at 87 feet (27 m) high and up to 900 feet (270 m) wide at peak flow. Although the falls used to flow powerfully year-round, most of the water is now diverted to the 60 megawatt hydroelectric plant of upstream Ryan Dam, reducing it to a trickle in the summer months. The dam raised the total height of the water to 177 feet.

The Mandan Indians knew of the group of the falls and called them by a descriptive (but not formal) name: Minni-Soze-Tanka-Kun-Ya, or "the great falls." The specific Grand Falls was named by William Clark of the Lewis and Clark Expedition in 1805.

Cottonwoods grow nearby, and the nearby shrubland habitat provides an environment for juniper, mule deer, and eagles. Various species of birds live below the falls.

== See also ==
- List of waterfalls
