= McCollum Mound =

Archaeological site in South Carolina, United States

- U.S. National Register of Historic Places
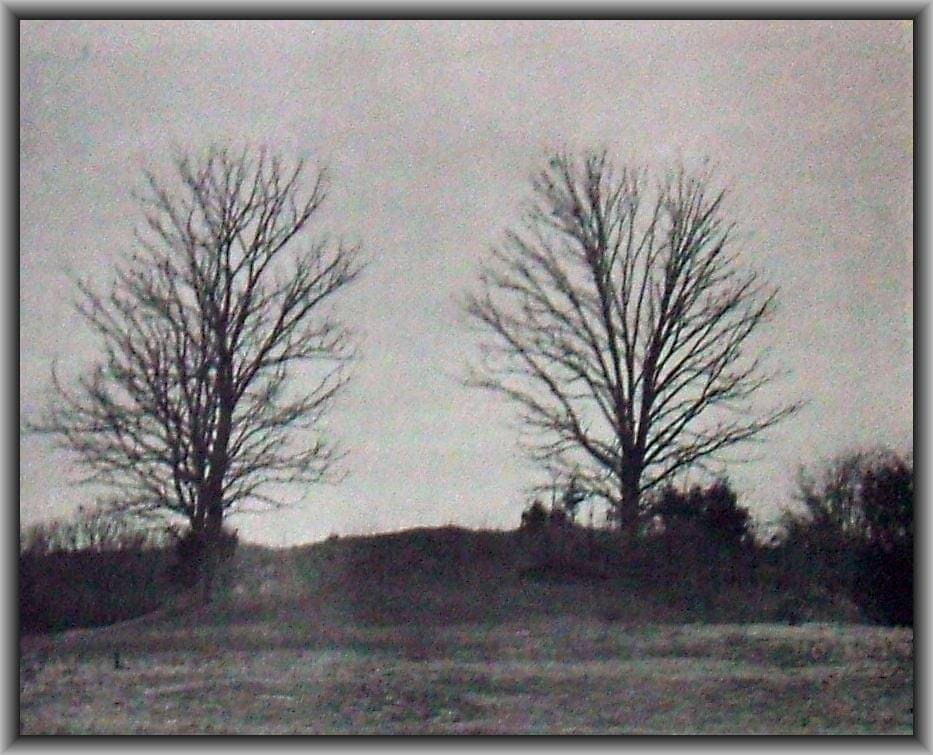

- Location within South Carolina Location within the United States
- Location: Confluence of the Broad River with Turkey Creek, near Chester, South Carolina
- Coordinates: 34°45′39″N 81°27′08″W
- Area: 9 acres (3.6 ha)
- NRHP reference No.: 72001204
- Added to NRHP: March 23, 1972

McCollum Mound, also known as Turkey Creek Mound and village, is a historic mound and village site located near Chester, Chester County, South Carolina. The site is one of less than two dozen mounds of aboriginal origin in the state of South Carolina.

The mound was built in three, or possibly more, stages. The Turkey Creek mound and village were probably inhabited during the late prehistoric and early historic periods.

The mound is located on the Broad River approximately 500–600 feet (150–180 m) downstream from the McCollum Fish Weir.

It was listed on the National Register of Historic Places in 1972.
