= Great Falls Historic District =

Historic district in Maine, United States

- U.S. National Register of Historic Places
- U.S. Historic district
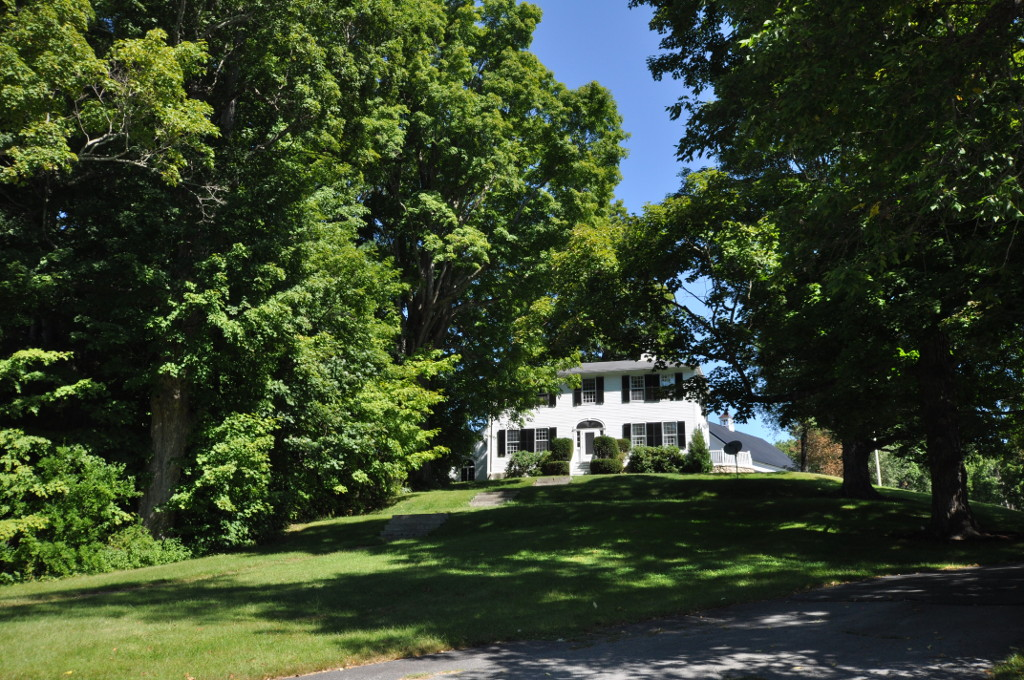

- Location within Maine Location within the United States
- Location: Along Windham Center Rd., E of Presumscot R., Windham), Maine.
- Coordinates: 43°48′9″N 70°26′49″W
- Area: 21 acres (8.5 ha)
- Built: 1798
- Architectural style: Greek Revival, Federal
- NRHP reference No.: 94001541
- Added to NRHP: January 12, 1995

The Great Falls Historic District encompasses the remains of an early 19th-century mill hamlet in Windham, Maine. On the east bank of the Presumpscot River north of Windham Center Road are a cluster of three houses from the period, as well as the archaeological remains (most visibly building foundations) of a few mills that lined the river at the falls just north of the road. The district was listed on the National Register of Historic Places in 1995.

== Description and history ==
The Presumpscot River runs from Sebago Lake to Casco Bay in southern Maine, forming the boundary between the towns of Gorham and Windham for part of its run. Windham Center Road, formerly Old Great Falls Road, crosses the river from central Windham to North Gorham just below a modern dam located at what has long been known as the river's Great Falls. The water power provided by the falls was first harnessed beginning in the 1780s, when Zebulon Trickey purchased land and a mill privilege. By 1788 the river had been bridged, and mills were located on both sides of the river. The area saw increased industrial development when the Cumberland and Oxford Canal opened in 1830, providing the area inexpensive means to bring manufactured goods to market. The area then declined after a major fire in 1872 destroyed the mills and the bridge, and the 1882 abandonment of the canal.

The principal visible surviving elements of the area's early industrial history are three houses. The oldest is the Trickey-White House at 20 Great Falls Road, a Federal style house believed to be built by Zebulon Trickey; it has an ell that may be of even greater age. The Federal style Peter Trickey House, at 8 Great Falls Road, was probably built by Enoch White about 1820, but was owned for many years by the Trickey family. The cellar hole of a later Enoch White House is located just north of this house. Finally, the Mayberry-Libby House at 4 Great Falls Road, built in 1847, is a particularly fine example of a Greek Revival house with a temple front. Industrial remnants of the district are located along the banks of the river, and are partially obscured by the modern bridge and dam at the site.

== See also ==
- National Register of Historic Places listings in Cumberland County, Maine
