= W. W. Durham House =

- U.S. National Register of Historic Places
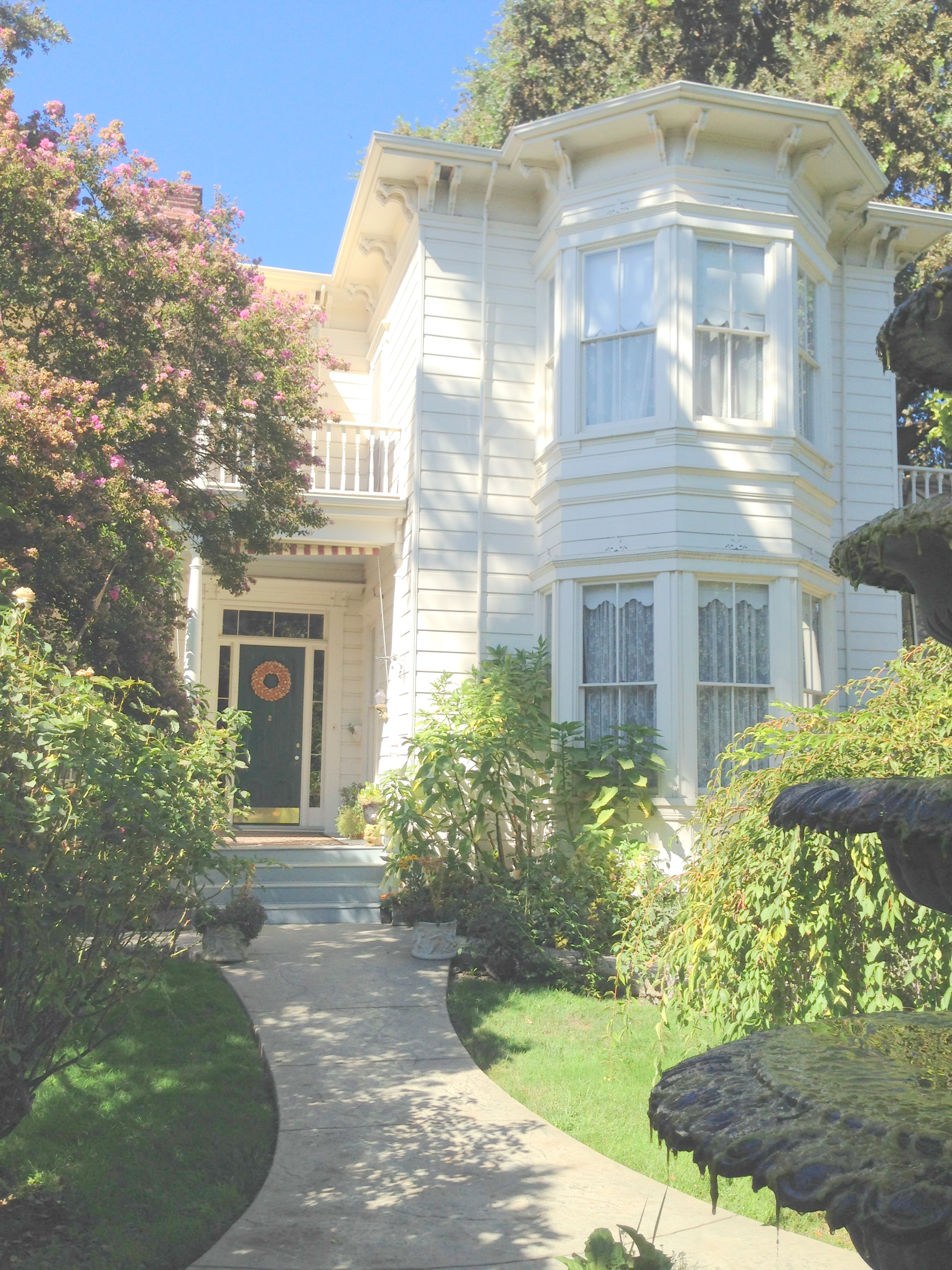
- Photo from 2014

- Location within California
- Location: 2280 Durham-Dayton Rd., Durham, California
- Coordinates: 39°38′48″N 121°47′36″W
- Area: 1.4 acres (0.57 ha)
- Built: 1874
- Architectural style: Italianate
- NRHP reference No.: 92000316
- Added to NRHP: April 2, 1992

The W. W. Durham House, at 2280 Durham-Dayton Rd. in Durham, California, was built in 1895 in Italianate style. It was listed on the National Register of Historic Places in 1992.

It is a wood-frame building upon a brick and concrete foundation. It is basically rectangular but has two protruding bays. It has a low hipped tin roof and bracketed eaves.

It was built in 1874 for W.W. Durham and his bride, Minnie Van Ness Durham. It is the only surviving building associated with W. W. Durham.

Electricity came in 1904. A garage was added to the property in 1910.
