= Namekawa Great Falls =

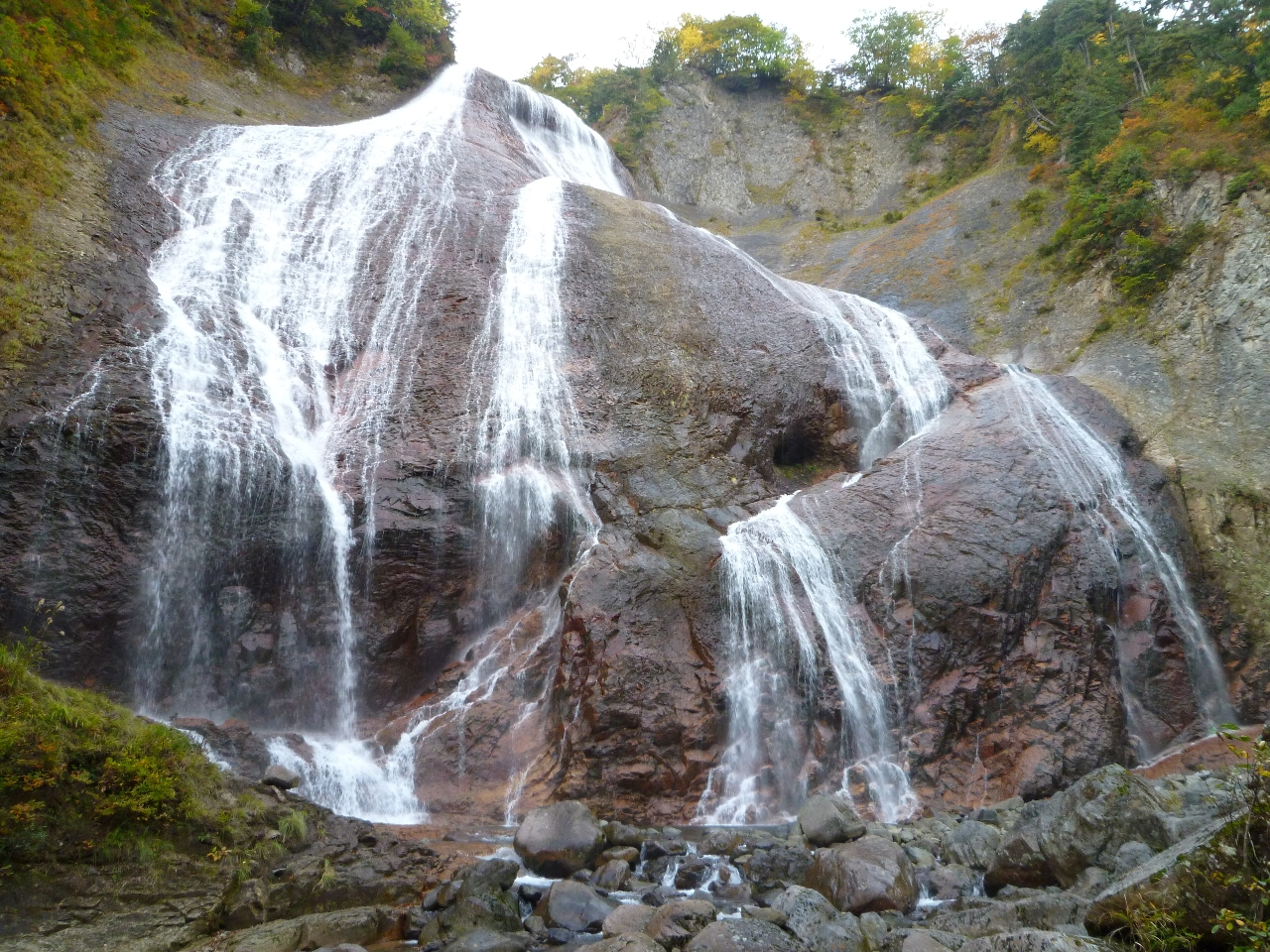

- Location within Japan
- Location: Yonezawa, Yamagata Prefecture, Japan
- Type: Fan horsetail
- Total height: 80 m (260 ft)
- Longest drop: 40 m (130 ft)

Namekawa Great Falls (滑川の大滝, Namekawa-Ōtaki) is a waterfall located in the city of Yonezawa, Yamagata Prefecture, Japan, on a branch of the Abukuma River. It is one of "Japan’s Top 100 Waterfalls", in a listing published by the Japanese Ministry of the Environment in 1990.

The falls form several streams over a large 100 metres (330 ft) outcropping of Rhyolite.
