= Landsford Plantation House =

Historic house in South Carolina, United States

- U.S. National Register of Historic Places
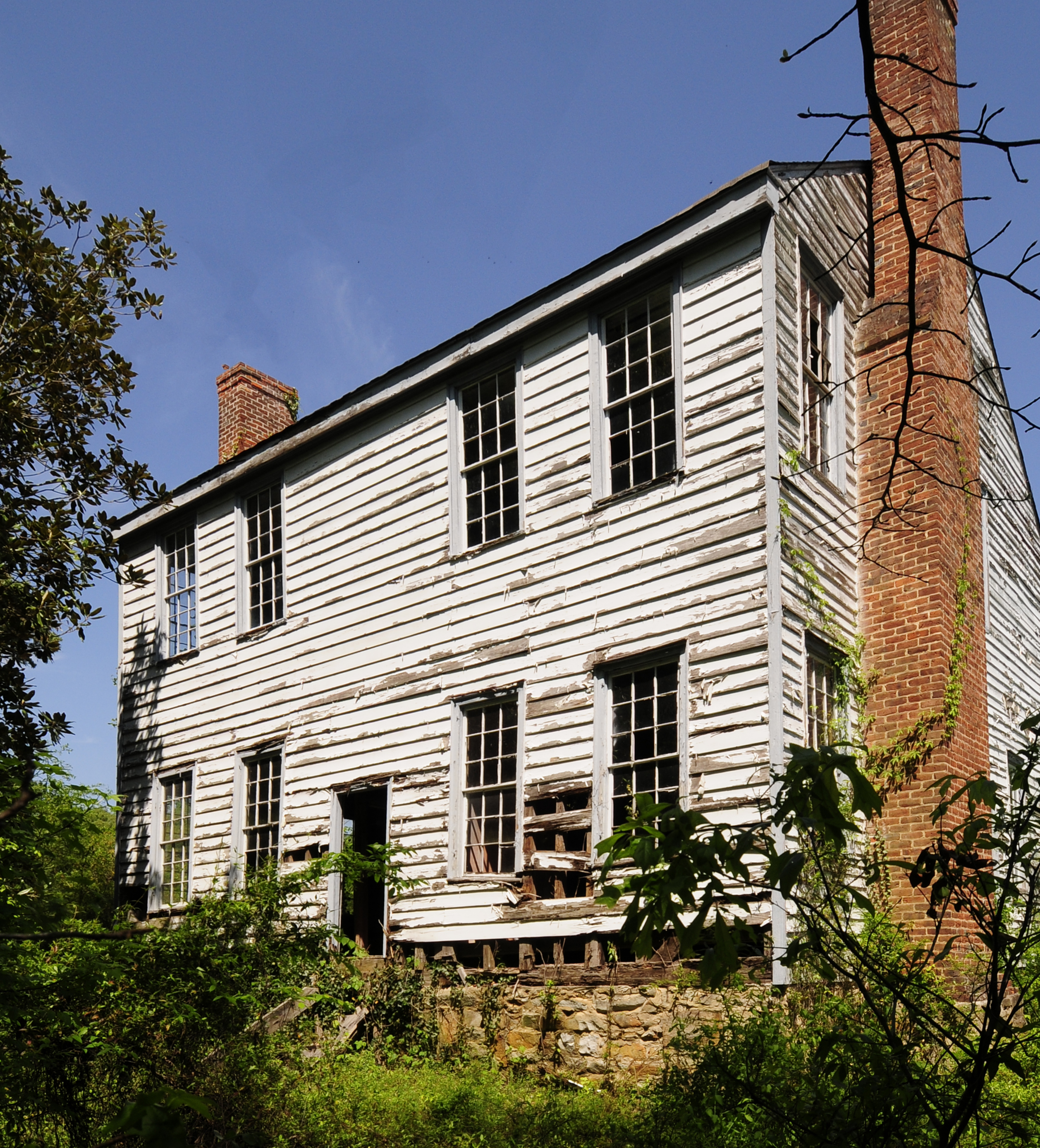
- Landsford Plantation House, April 2012

- Location within South Carolina Location within the United States
- Location: CR 595 1/2 mi. E of US 21, Landsford, South Carolina
- Coordinates: 34°47′04″N 80°54′43″W
- Area: 10 acres (4.0 ha)
- Built: c. 1828
- NRHP reference No.: 86003520
- Added to NRHP: February 4, 1987

Landsford Plantation House, also known as the Davie House, is a historic plantation house located near Richburg, Chester County, South Carolina. It was built about 1828, and is a 2 1/2-story, timber-framed weatherboarded vernacular residence. The house has a square plan and is two rooms deep. The main façade featured a one-story porch, resting on brick piers, and added about the turn of the 20th century. Landsford Plantation achieved local prominence as the social center of a 3,000 acres (1,200 ha) Piedmont cotton plantation in the mid-19th century. Of the original outbuildings, only a barn of log construction remains.

It was listed on the National Register of Historic Places in 1987.
