= Chester City Hall and Opera House =

- U.S. National Register of Historic Places
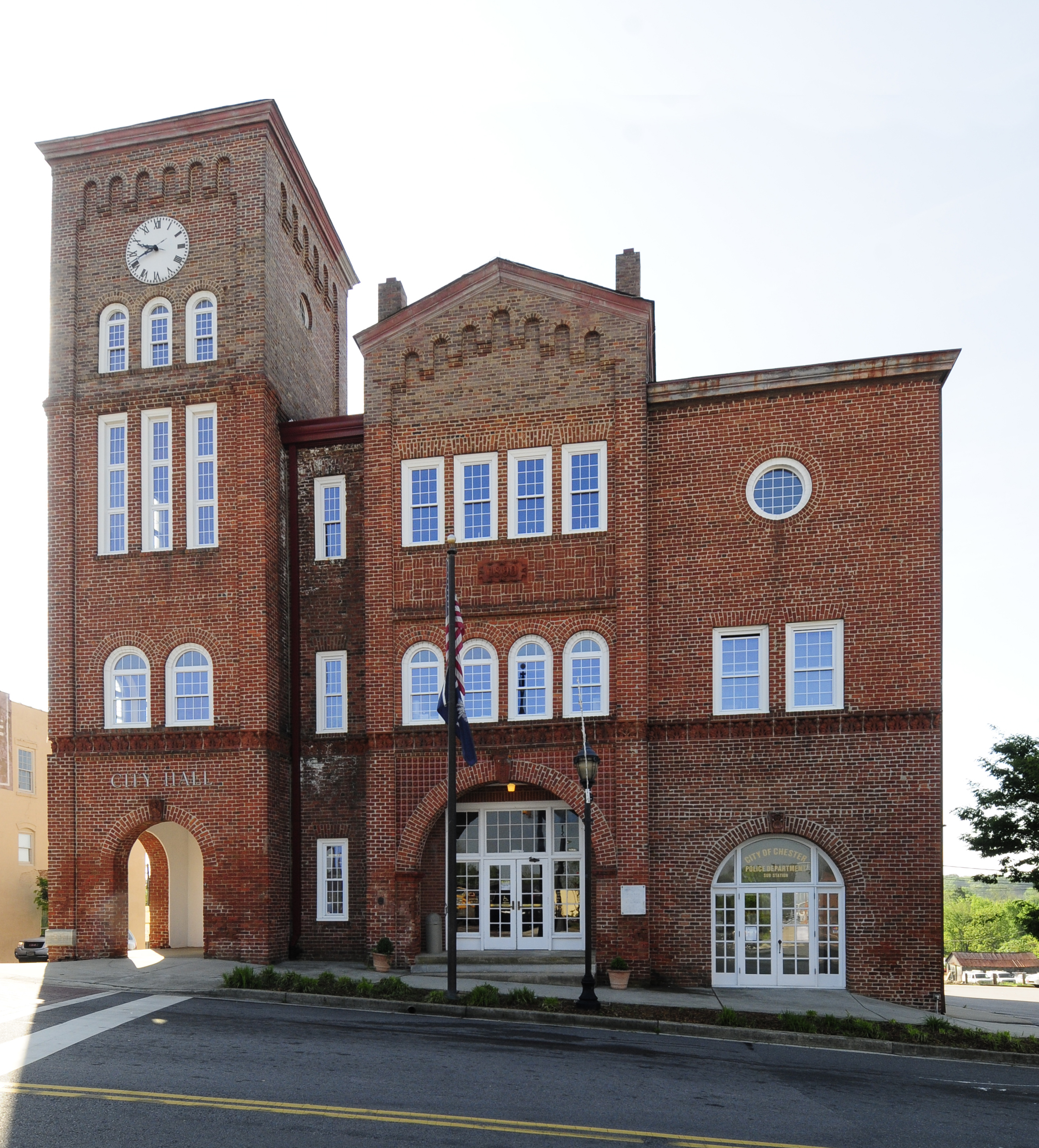
- Chester City Hall and Opera House, April 2012

- Location within South Carolina Location within the United States
- Location: Corner of West End and Columbia Sts., Chester, South Carolina
- Coordinates: 34°42′11″N 81°12′47″W
- Area: 0.3 acres (0.12 ha)
- Built: 1891
- Architect: Munson, Frank
- Architectural style: Romanesque
- NRHP reference No.: 73001704
- Added to NRHP: March 30, 1973

Chester City Hall and Opera House is a historic city hall and theatre located at Chester, Chester County, South Carolina. It was built in 1890–1891, and is a Romanesque Revival style brick building. The façade consists of three sections: a four-story tower, gabled three-story central section, and a less ornate three-story section. The interior was renovated following a fire in 1929, which destroyed the original spire tower containing a four-faced clock. Since 1891, this building has housed the town's administrative offices.

It was listed on the National Register of Historic Places in 1973.
