= Lockhart, South Carolina =

- Town
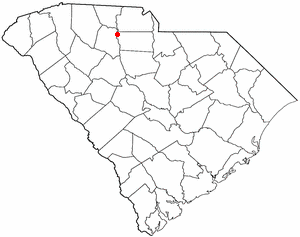
- Location of Lockhart, South Carolina
- Coordinates: 34°47′33″N 81°27′41″W
- Country: United States
- State: South Carolina
- County: Union

Area
  - Total: 0.41 sq mi (1.06 km^{2})
  - Land: 0.31 sq mi (0.79 km^{2})
  - Water: 0.10 sq mi (0.27 km^{2})
- Elevation: 397 ft (121 m)

Population (2020)
  - Total: 384
  - Density: 1,258.4/sq mi (485.88/km^{2})
- Time zone: UTC-5 (Eastern (EST))
  - Summer (DST): UTC-4 (EDT)
- ZIP code: 29364
- Area codes: 864, 821
- FIPS code: 45-42190
- GNIS feature ID: 2406034

Lockhart is a town in Union County, South Carolina, United States. As of the 2020 census, Lockhart had a population of 384.

== History ==
The McCollum Fish Weir was listed on the National Register of Historic Places in 1974.

== Geography ==
According to the United States Census Bureau, the town has a total area of 0.2 square miles (0.52 km^{2}), of which, 0.1 square miles (0.26 km^{2}) of it is land and 0.1 square miles (0.26 km^{2}) of it (39.13%) is water.

John D. Long Lake is 3 miles (4.8 km) west of the town center.

== Demographics ==
Historical population
Census	Pop.	Note	%±
1960	128		—
1970	103		−19.5%
1980	85		−17.5%
1990	58		−31.8%
2000	39		−32.8%
2010	488		1,151.3%
2020	384		−21.3%
U.S. Decennial Census

As of the census of 2000, there were 39 people, 19 households, and 12 families residing in the town. The population density was 270.4 inhabitants per square mile (104.4/km^{2}). There were 22 housing units at an average density of 152.5 per square mile (58.9/km^{2}). The racial makeup of the town was 82.05% White and 17.95% African American.

There were 19 households, out of which 21.1% had children under the age of 18 living with them, 47.4% were married couples living together, 21.1% had a female householder with no husband present, and 31.6% were non-families. 31.6% of all households were made up of individuals, and 5.3% had someone living alone who was 65 years of age or older. The average household size was 2.05 and the average family size was 2.54.

In the town, 20.5% of the population was under the age of 18, 5.1% was from 18 to 24, 38.5% from 25 to 44, 23.1% from 45 to 64, and 12.8% was 65 years of age or older. The median age was 42 years. For every 100 females, there were 77.3 males. For every 100 females age 18 and over, there were 55.0 males.

The median income for a household in the town was $24,583, and the median income for a family was $42,500. Males had a median income of $32,500 versus $16,250 for females. The per capita income for the town was $13,263. There were no families and 9.8% of the population living below the poverty line, including no under eighteens and none of those over 64.

== Education ==
Lockhart High School closed in 2007. The school remained open for Elementary and Middle school aged students until 2019. Now local students attend Union County High School. There is only one public high school in Union County.

== Notable people ==
- Cecile Brawley Long (1900–1983), President General of the United Daughters of the Confederacy
