= Catholic Presbyterian Church =

Historic church in South Carolina, United States

- U.S. National Register of Historic Places
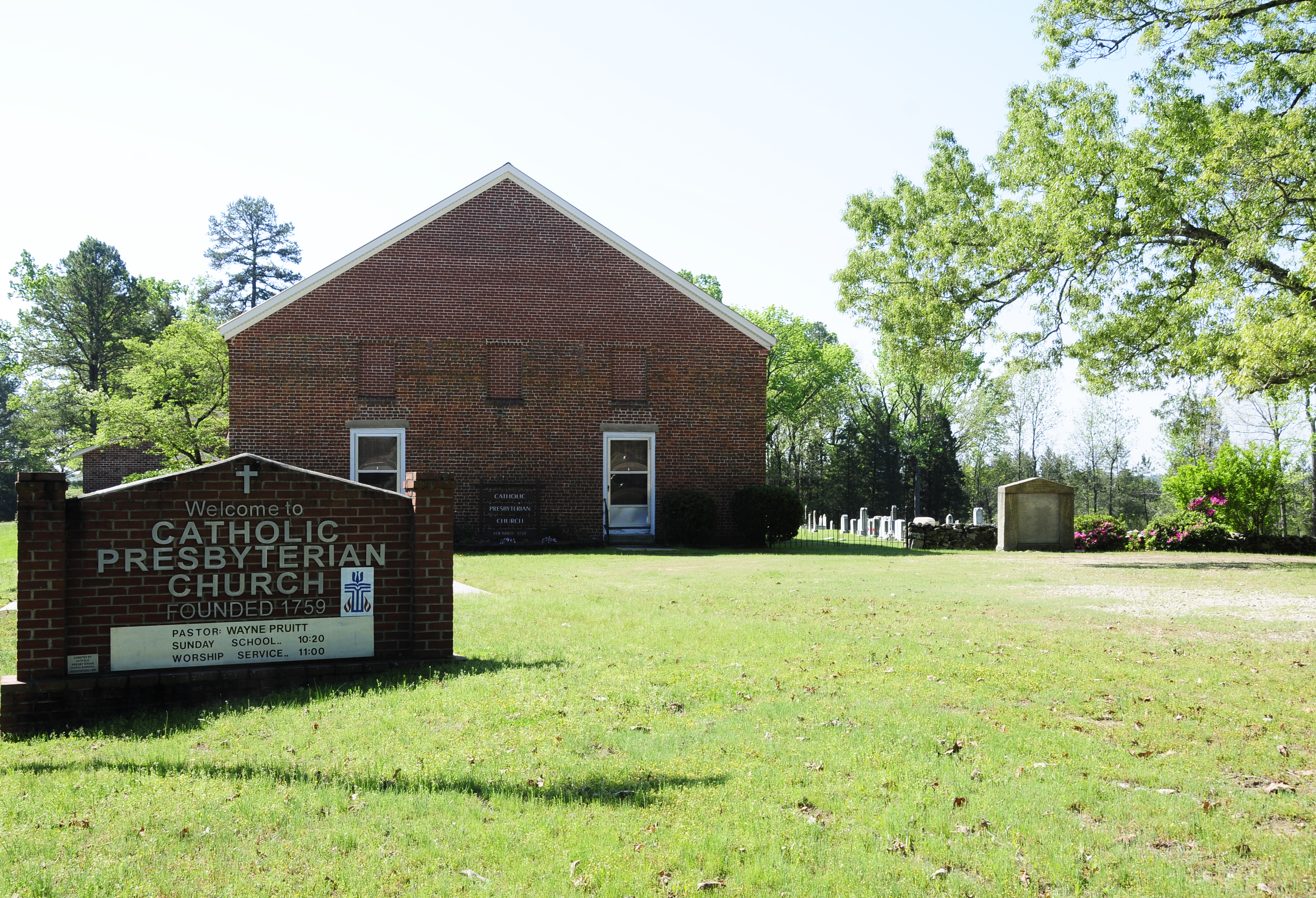

- Location within South Carolina Location within the United States
- Nearest city: Chester, South Carolina
- Coordinates: 34°35′56″N 81°2′7″W
- Area: 5 acres (2.0 ha)
- Built: 1842
- Architect: David Lyle
- NRHP reference No.: 71000762
- Added to NRHP: May 06, 1971

Catholic Presbyterian Church is a historic Presbyterian church in Chester, South Carolina. The church congregation was founded in 1759 and sixty-two men from the church served in the Revolutionary War. Several are buried nearby. The current brick church building, the third located on the same site, was constructed in 1842 and added to the National Register of Historic Places in 1971.
