= Lando School =

- U.S. National Register of Historic Places
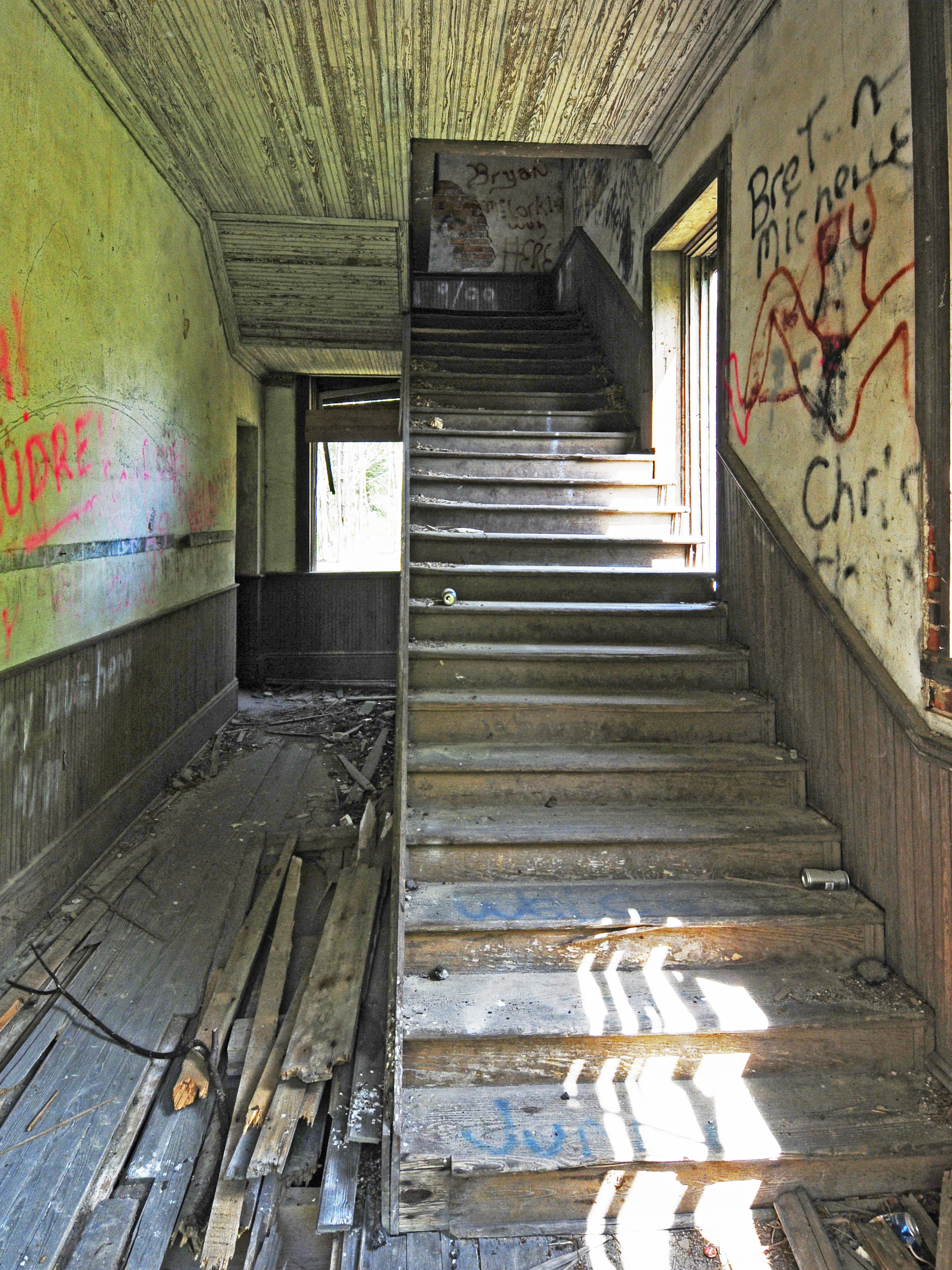
- Lando Schoolhouse interior, April 2012

- Location within South Carolina Location within the United States
- Location: Schoolhouse Rd., Lando, South Carolina
- Coordinates: 34°46′37″N 81°00′44″W
- Area: less than one acre
- Built: 1904-1905
- Architectural style: Renaissance
- NRHP reference No.: 09000485
- Added to NRHP: July 1, 2009

Lando School is a historic school building located at Lando, Chester County, South Carolina. It was built in 1904–1905, and is a three-story, rectangular brick building set upon a concrete foundation and with an L-shaped hipped roof. It features brick on the first two floors and brick and stucco on the third floor and is in the Italian Renaissance Revival style. The first two floors of the school housed classrooms and the main level of the auditorium, while the third floor was essentially balcony seating for the auditorium. Lando School was built as the school for Manetta Mill, and closed in 1955. Manetta Mills remained in operation under a succession of owners until 1991.

It was listed on the National Register of Historic Places in 2009.
