= McCollum Fish Weir =

Archaeological site in South Carolina, United States

- U.S. National Register of Historic Places
- Location within South Carolina Location within the United States
- Nearest city: Lockhart, South Carolina
- Coordinates: 34°35′45″N 81°25′20″W
- Area: less than one acre
- NRHP reference No.: 74001845
- Added to NRHP: August 28, 1974

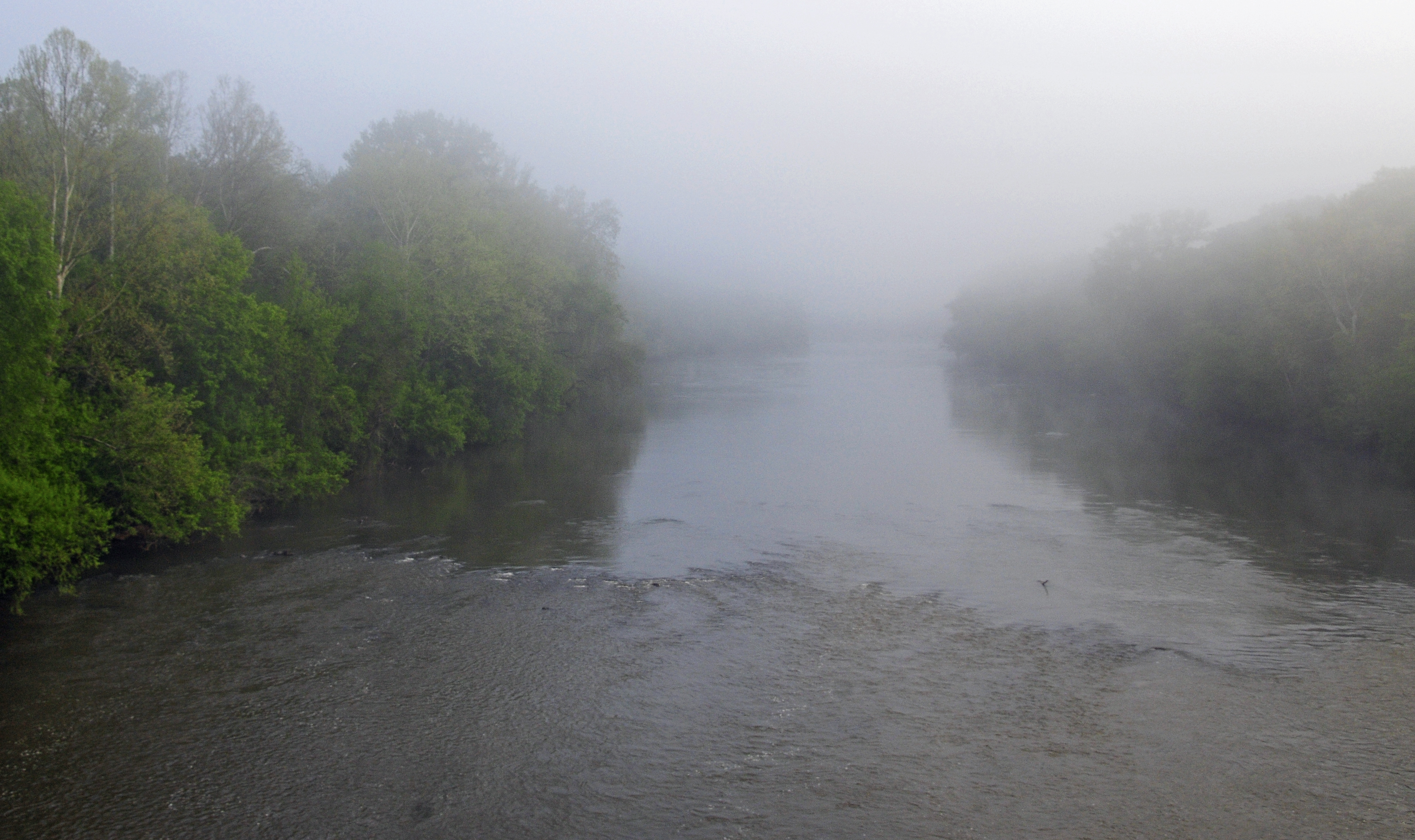

McCollum Fish Weir is a historic Native American fish weir located near Lockhart, Chester County, South Carolina. The site consists of a V-shaped fish trap or weir located on the Broad River approximately 500–600 feet (150–180 m) upstream from the McCollum Mound, from which it gets its name.

It was listed on the National Register of Historic Places in 1974.
