= Great Falls Transit =

- Founded: 1982
- Headquarters: 3905 North Star Blvd
- Locale: Great Falls, Montana
- Service type: bus service, paratransit
- Routes: 7
- Website: gftransit.com

Great Falls Transit provides public transportation to Great Falls and Black Eagle in Cascade County, Montana. The bus service was founded in 1982 and offers seven routes on weekdays.

== Routes ==
All routes meet downtown.

Number	Name	Route	Frequency		Operation		Link
Number	Name	Route	peaks	off -peaks	Week days	Satur days	Link
1	Southeast	To Walmart East via University of Great Falls	30 min	60 min	6:17; 18:38	9:32; 17:38	link
2	Central	To Walmart East via Central Avenue	30 min	60 min	6:30; 18:24	9:45; 17:24	link
3	Northcentral	To Walmart East via Eighth Avenue North	30 min	60 min	6:23; 18:29	9:38; 17:29	link
4	Southcentral	To Walmart East via Sixth Avenue South	30 min	60 min	6:23; 18:28	9:38; 17:28	link
5	Northwest	To Division road via Central Avenue West, 6th St NW, 3rd Ave NW, 14th St NW, 7th Ave NW, 9th St NW, Smelter Avenue, 5th St NW, 14 Ave NW and 1st St NW	30 min	60 min	6:28; 18:25	10:10; 17:25	link
6	Northeast	To Division road via 1/2 Ave N, 14/15 St N, 15th St NE, Chicago, 21st St NE, Smelter Avenue, 8th St NE, 9th St NE, 36th Ave NE, 6th St NE, 33rd Ave NE and 2nd St NE	30 min	60 min	6:21; 18:33	10:10; 17:33	link
7	Southwest	To Great Falls Marketplace via 3rd St NW, Northwest Bypass Shopping and 6th St NW	60 min	60 min	6:25; 18:27	10:10; 17:27	link
