= Lando, South Carolina =

- Unincorporated community
- Location within South Carolina
- Coordinates: 34°46′35″N 81°0′37″W
- Country: United States
- State: South Carolina
- County: Chester
- Elevation: 509 ft (155 m)

Population (2000)
  - Total: 89
- Time zone: UTC-5 (Eastern (EST))
  - Summer (DST): UTC-4 (EDT)
- ZIP code: 29729
- Area codes: 803, 839
- GNIS feature ID: 1246287

Lando is a rural unincorporated community in Chester County, South Carolina, United States and a former textile village. Lando has a post office with the ZIP Code of 29724; the population of the ZCTA for 29724 was 89 at the 2000 census.

== History ==
Settled in the 1760s, and called Walker's Mill, the future Lando was a prime location for watermills along Fishing Creek. For most of the 20th century, the main employer in the village was Manetta Mills, one of the largest blanket makers in the world. After the mill closed in 1991, Lando lost most of its population, going from about 2000 to about 20 who still live in town. The Lando School was listed on the National Register of Historic Places in 2009.

== Sources ==
- http://landomanettamillshistorycenter.com/
- http://www.nationalregister.sc.gov/chester/S10817712018/index.htm
- http://www.amazon.com/gp/product/0738552682
