= Lewis Inn =

- Lewis Inn and Lewisville Female Seminary
- U.S. National Register of Historic Places
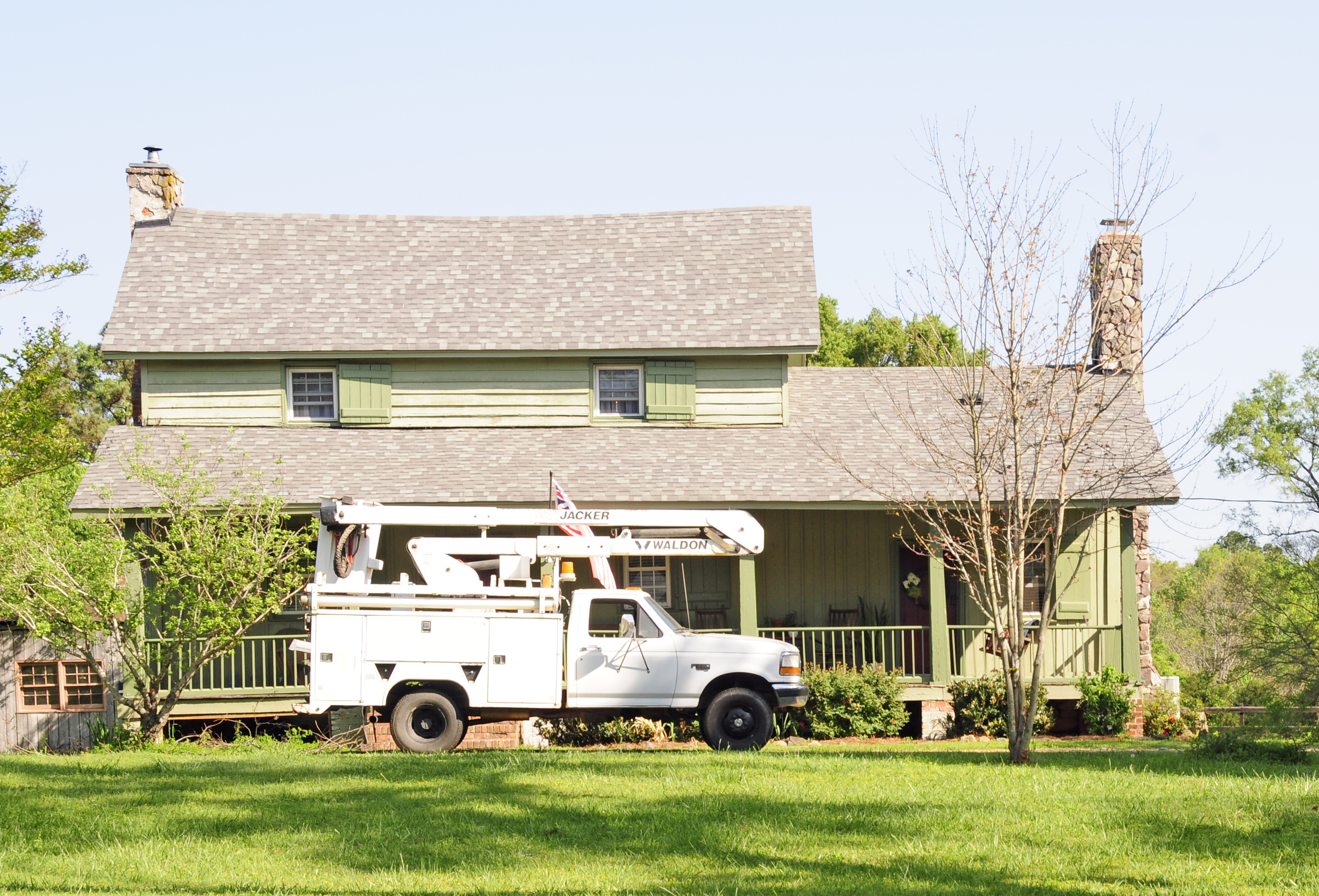
- Lewis Inn, April 2012

- Location within South Carolina Location within the United States
- Location: Northeast of Chester off South Carolina Highway 72, near Chester, South Carolina
- Coordinates: 34°46′36″N 81°8′16″W
- Area: 9.5 acres (3.8 ha)
- Built: c. 1750, 1807
- NRHP reference No.: 71000763
- Added to NRHP: May 6, 1971

Lewis Inn is a historic inn near Chester, Chester County, South Carolina, United States. It was built about 1750 and is a "matched" two-story log house covered with clapboard. It was re-covered with brown shingles in 1923. It has a lateral gable roof, with exterior end chimneys, and a one-story right wing. The inn was a tavern during Colonial and Revolutionary days and also a stagecoach stop. In 1807, Aaron Burr spent the night there on his way to Richmond for trial on charges of treason. Legend has it that Burr escaped briefly because a bribed maid left his bedroom door unlatched.

The site was listed on the National Register of Historic Places in 1971.

== Lewisville Female Seminary ==
Founded in the 1840s on this site, Lewisville Female Seminary closed in 1854 upon the death of its principal A.S. Wylie. It was "one of the earliest and best boarding schools in Chester County." In the early 1880s its owner, William Wylie, enlarged a log structure on the premises into an 11-room dormitory for young ladies. The school was in a separate building which has now been dismantled. A.S. Wylie, as principal of the school, developed the community's interest in high educational standards. Minimum age for admission to the school was 13.
