= Chester Historic District =

Historic district in South Carolina, United States

- U.S. National Register of Historic Places
- U.S. Historic district
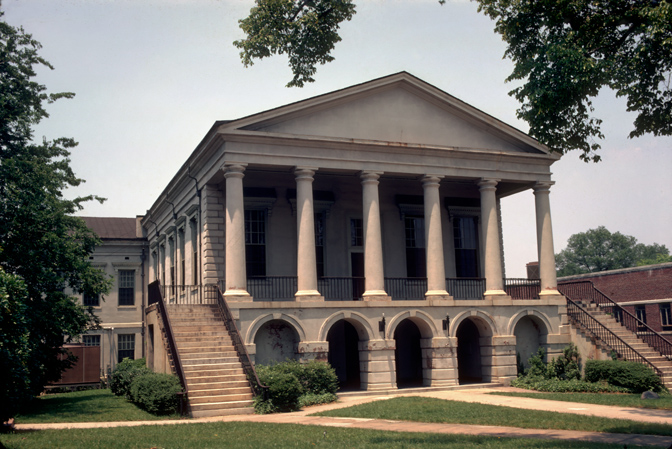
- Chester County Courthouse

- Location within South Carolina Location within the United States
- Location: Commercial area centered around jct. of U.S. 321 and SC 72 (original) and Roughly bounded by Hemphill Ave., Brawley, Saluda, and FooteSts. and along Reedy St. (increase), Chester, South Carolina
- Coordinates: 34°42′20″N 81°12′55″W
- Area: 300 acres (120 ha); 250 acres (100 ha) increase
- Architect: Landers, Fred; Et al. (increase)
- Architectural style: Greek Revival, Gothic, Romanesque (original) and Classical Revival, Greek Revival, Late Victorian (increase)
- NRHP reference No.: 72001203 (original); 87000684 (increase)

Significant dates
- Added to NRHP: June 13, 1972
- Boundary increase: March 15, 1988

Chester Historic District in Chester, South Carolina is a historic district that was listed on the National Register of Historic Places in 1972.

The district contains 324 contributing properties.

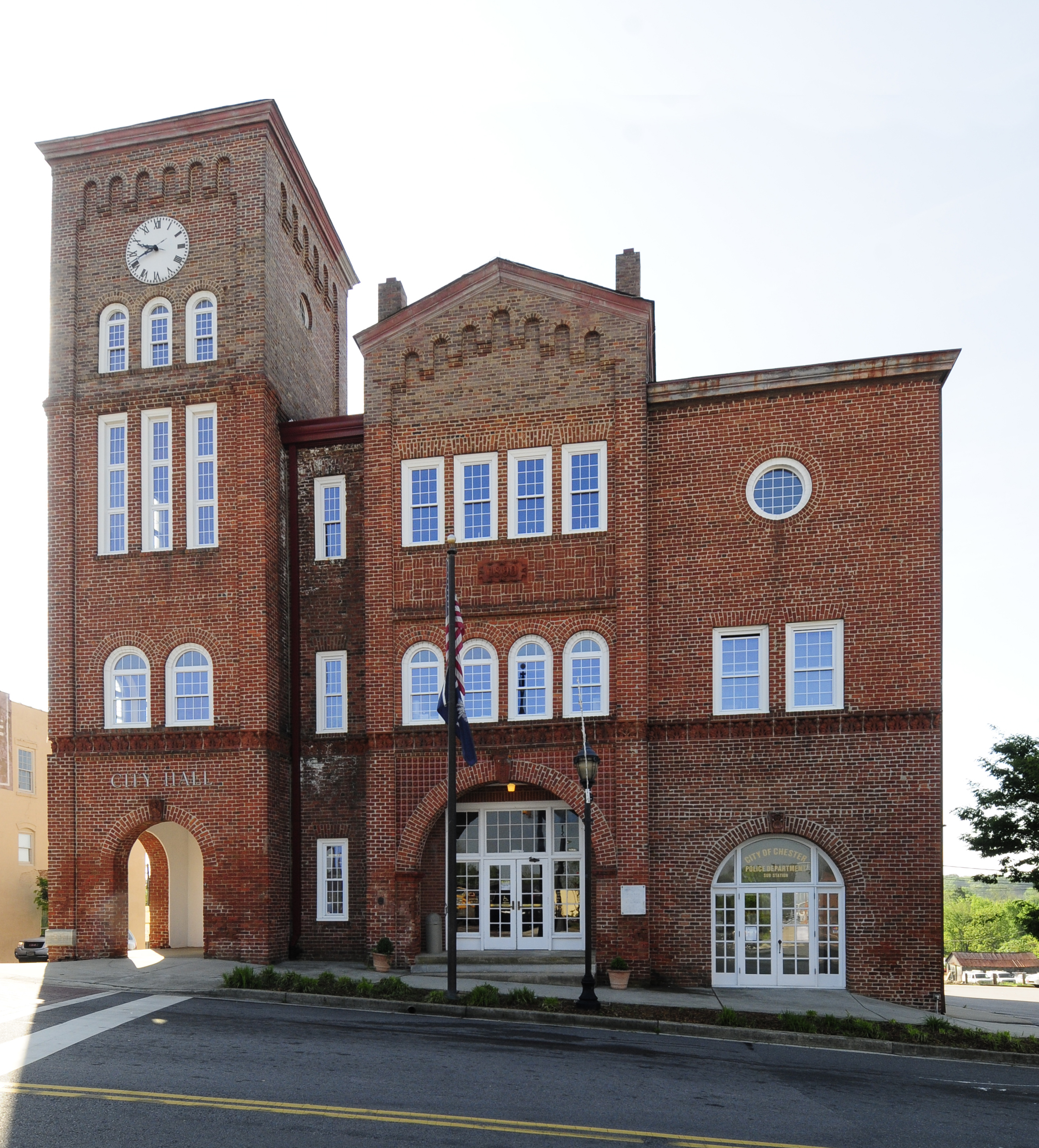
Chester City Hall
