= Fishdam Ford =

- U.S. National Register of Historic Places
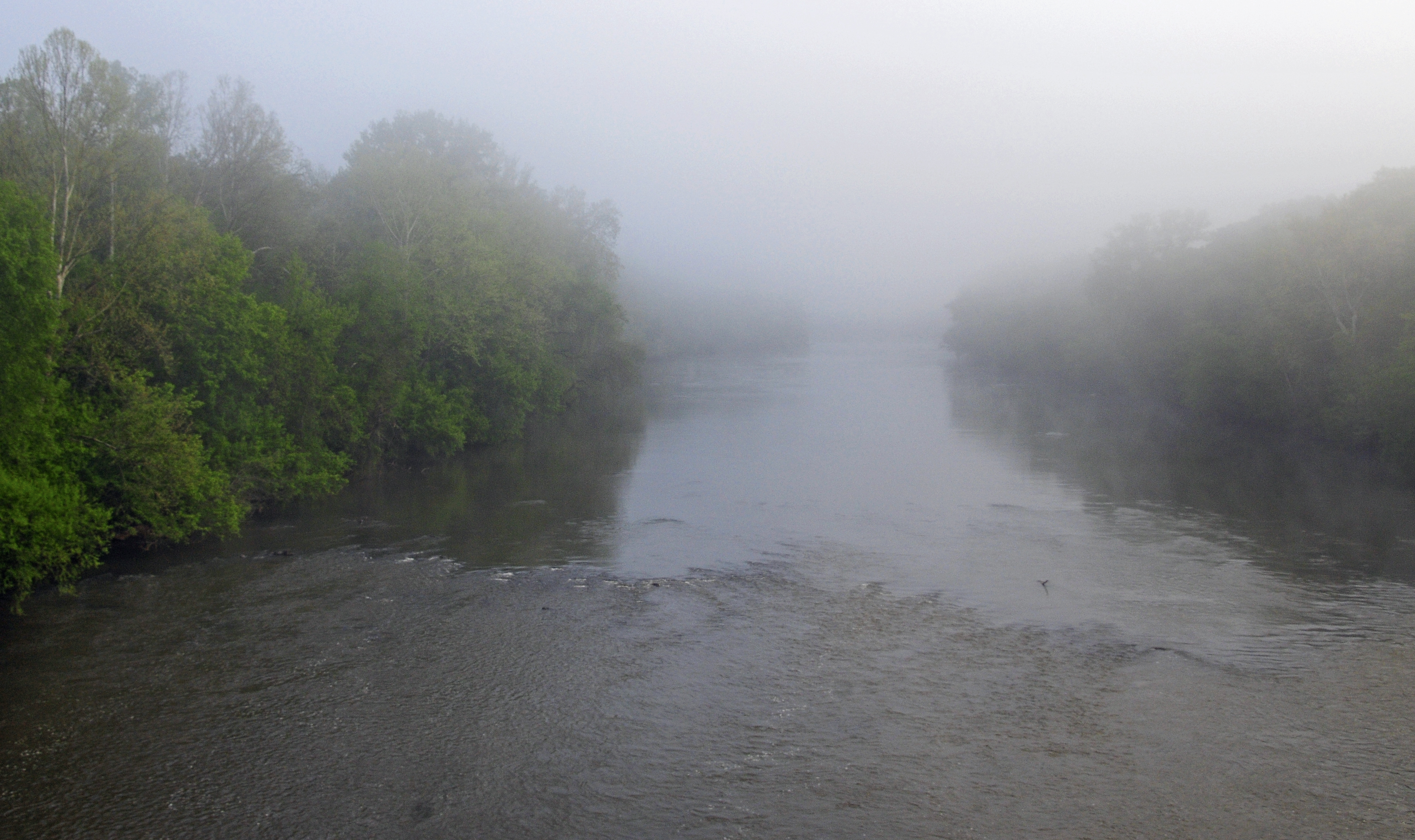
- Fishdam Ford, April 2012

- Location within South Carolina Location within the United States
- Location: Southwest of Chester off South Carolina Highway 72, near Chester, South Carolina
- Coordinates: 34°35′45″N 81°25′20″W
- Area: less than one acre
- NRHP reference No.: 73001705
- Added to NRHP: August 14, 1973

Fishdam Ford is a historic ford and fish trap located near Chester, Chester County, South Carolina. The ford is believed to be of Native American origin. Adjacent to the ford is a Native American fish trap. Fishdam Ford is not only representative of an aboriginal method of fishing that existed in this country long before the coming of the Europeans but the ford also played an important role in the Colonial history of the Carolina back country.

It was listed on the National Register of Historic Places in 1973.
