= Durham-Shores House =

Historic house in Delaware, United States

- U.S. National Register of Historic Places
- Location within Delaware Location within the United States
- Location: E side of DE 15, Dupont Station, Delaware
- Coordinates: 39°11′46″N 75°33′49″W
- Area: 0.1 acres (0.040 ha)
- Built: c. 1860, c. 1910
- MPS: House and Garden in Central Delaware MPS
- NRHP reference No.: 01001005
- Added to NRHP: September 21, 2001

Durham-Shores House is a historic home located near Dupont Station, Kent County, Delaware. It is an L-shaped dwelling constructed in two parts. Its original plan was as a "house and garden" style dwelling a 1 1/2-half-story, two-bay dwelling containing a single finished room on the ground floor and a second room above. The original section was built about 1860. A two-story, four-bay, block built about 1910, forms the stem of the "L."

It was listed on the National Register of Historic Places in 2001.
