= People's Free Library of South Carolina =

- U.S. National Register of Historic Places
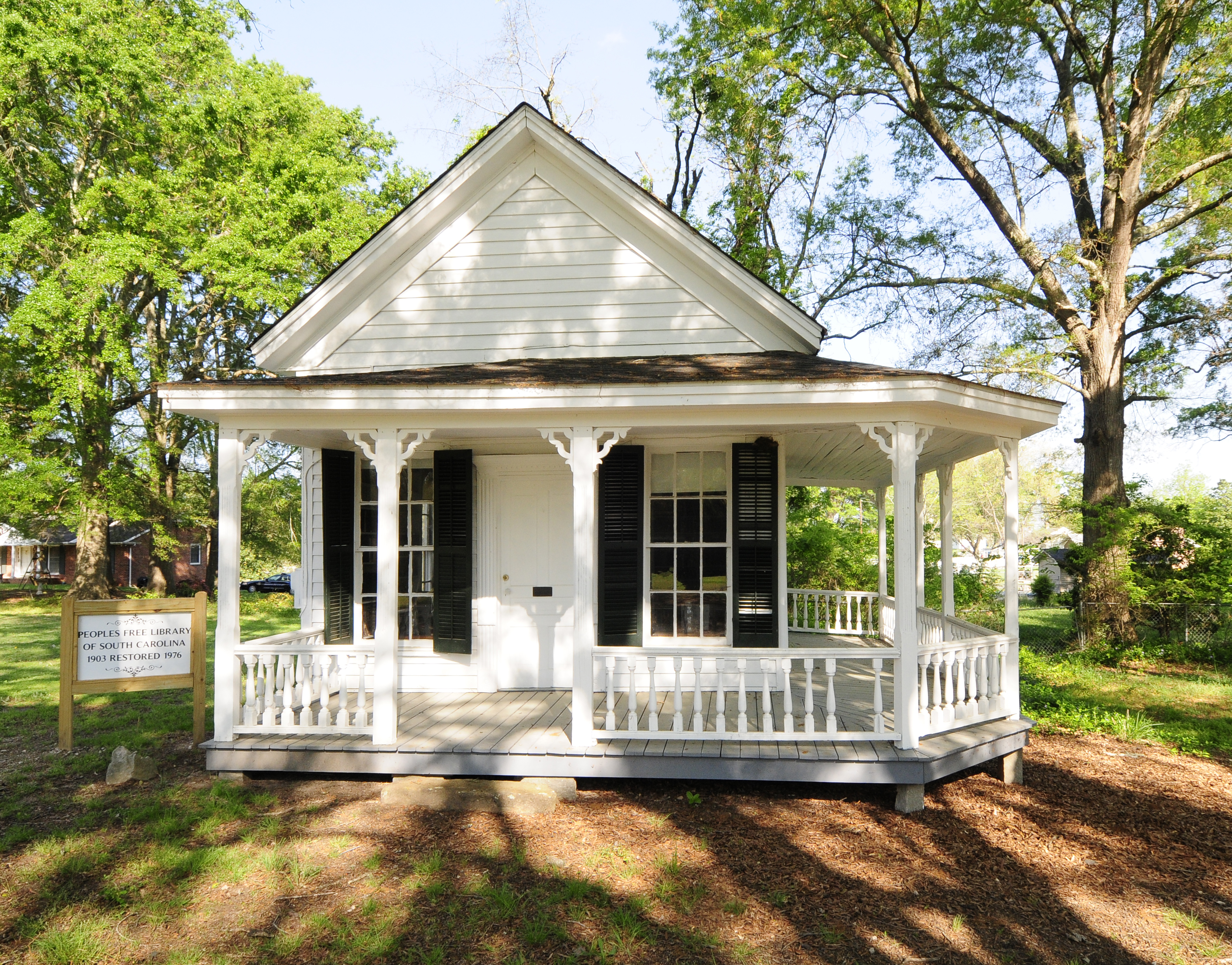
- People's Free Library of South Carolina, April 2012

- Location within South Carolina Location within the United States
- Location: Church St., Lowrys, South Carolina
- Coordinates: 34°48′16″N 81°14′29″W
- Area: less than one acre
- Built: 1903-1904
- NRHP reference No.: 82001520
- Added to NRHP: October 29, 1982

People's Free Library of South Carolina is a historic library building located at Lowrys, Chester County, South Carolina, United States. It was built in 1903–04, and is a small, one-story, rectangular building with a single room. The building has a gable roof, weatherboard siding, and stone foundation piers. It features a wooden wraparound porch. The building was restored in 1976, and serves as a museum and community landmark. The library operated a traveling library service from 1904 until at least 1909, perhaps the first such service in the state.

It was listed on the National Register of Historic Places in 1982.
