= Richburg, South Carolina =

- Town
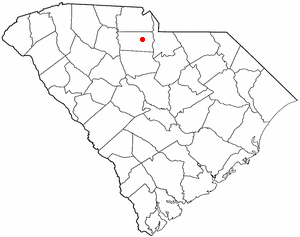
- Location of Richburg, South Carolina
- Coordinates: 34°43′00″N 81°01′10″W
- Country: United States
- State: South Carolina
- County: Chester

Area
  - Total: 0.88 sq mi (2.27 km^{2})
  - Land: 0.88 sq mi (2.27 km^{2})
  - Water: 0 sq mi (0.00 km^{2})
- Elevation: 581 ft (177 m)

Population (2020)
  - Total: 280
  - Density: 319.5/sq mi (123.37/km^{2})
- Time zone: UTC-5 (Eastern (EST))
  - Summer (DST): UTC-4 (ES)
- ZIP code: 29729
- Area codes: 803, 839
- FIPS code: 45-59920
- GNIS feature ID: 2407206

Richburg is a town in Chester County, South Carolina, United States. As of the 2020 census, Richburg had a population of 280.

== History ==
The Elliott House and Landsford Plantation House are listed on the National Register of Historic Places.

== Geography ==
Richburg is located in east-central Chester County. Interstate 77 passes just west of the town, with access from Exits 62 and 65. I-77 leads north 40 miles (64 km) to Charlotte and south 53 miles (85 km) to Columbia. South Carolina Highway 9 passes through the northeast side of the town, leading west 13 miles (21 km) to Chester, the county seat, and east 16 miles (26 km) to Lancaster.

According to the United States Census Bureau, Richburg has a total area of 0.89 square miles (2.3 km^{2}), all of it land.

== Demographics ==
Historical population
Census	Pop.	Note	%±
1880	121		—
1890	186		53.7%
1900	240		29.0%
1910	245		2.1%
1920	222		−9.4%
1930	245		10.4%
1940	183		−25.3%
1950	238		30.1%
1960	235		−1.3%
1970	304		29.4%
1980	269		−11.5%
1990	405		50.6%
2000	332		−18.0%
2010	275		−17.2%
2020	280		1.8%
U.S. Decennial Census

=== 2020 census ===
Richburg town, South Carolina – Racial and ethnic composition Note: the US Census treats Hispanic/Latino as an ethnic category. This table excludes Latinos from the racial categories and assigns them to a separate category. Hispanics/Latinos may be of any race.
Race / Ethnicity (NH = Non-Hispanic)	Pop 2000	Pop 2010	Pop 2020	% 2000	% 2010	% 2020
White alone (NH)	77	91	65	23.19%	33.09%	23.21%
Black or African American alone (NH)	245	182	201	73.80%	66.18%	71.79%
Native American or Alaska Native alone (NH)	0	0	1	0.00%	0.00%	0.36%
Asian alone (NH)	4	0	0	1.20%	0.00%	0.00%
Native Hawaiian or Pacific Islander alone (NH)	0	0	0	0.00%	0.00%	0.00%
Other race alone (NH)	0	0	0	0.00%	0.00%	0.00%
Mixed race or Multiracial (NH)	2	2	10	0.60%	0.73%	3.57%
Hispanic or Latino (any race)	4	0	3	1.20%	0.00%	1.07%
Total	332	275	280	100.00%	100.00%	100.00%

=== 2000 census ===
As of the census of 2000, there were 332 people, 122 households, and 87 families residing in the town. The population density was 400.2 inhabitants per square mile (154.5/km^{2}). There were 134 housing units at an average density of 161.5 per square mile (62.4/km^{2}). The racial makeup of the town was 23.49% White, 74.70% African American, 1.20% Asian, and 0.60% from two or more races. Hispanic or Latino of any race were 1.20% of the population.

There were 122 households, out of which 31.1% had children under the age of 18 living with them, 38.5% were married couples living together, 27.0% had a female householder with no husband present, and 27.9% were non-families. 24.6% of all households were made up of individuals, and 15.6% had someone living alone who was 65 years of age or older. The average household size was 2.72 and the average family size was 3.26.

In the town, the population was spread out, with 24.7% under the age of 18, 7.8% from 18 to 24, 21.7% from 25 to 44, 29.5% from 45 to 64, and 16.3% who were 65 years of age or older. The median age was 40 years. For every 100 females, there were 77.5 males. For every 100 females age 18 and over, there were 71.2 males.

The median income for a household in the town was $31,875, and the median income for a family was $40,000. Males had a median income of $35,893 versus $18,295 for females. The per capita income for the town was $13,048. About 9.7% of families and 13.6% of the population were below the poverty line, including 22.5% of those under age 18 and 21.4% of those age 65 or over.

== Education ==
Richburg has a public library, a branch of the Chester County Library System.

== Media ==
- WRBK, 90.3 FM, a noncommercial station that primarily features classic oldies

== Notable residents ==
- Buck Baker, NASCAR driver
- Sheldon Brown, professional football player
- John P. Gaston, politician
- Marty Marion, baseball player (birthplace)
