= Republic Theater (South Carolina) =

- U.S. National Register of Historic Places
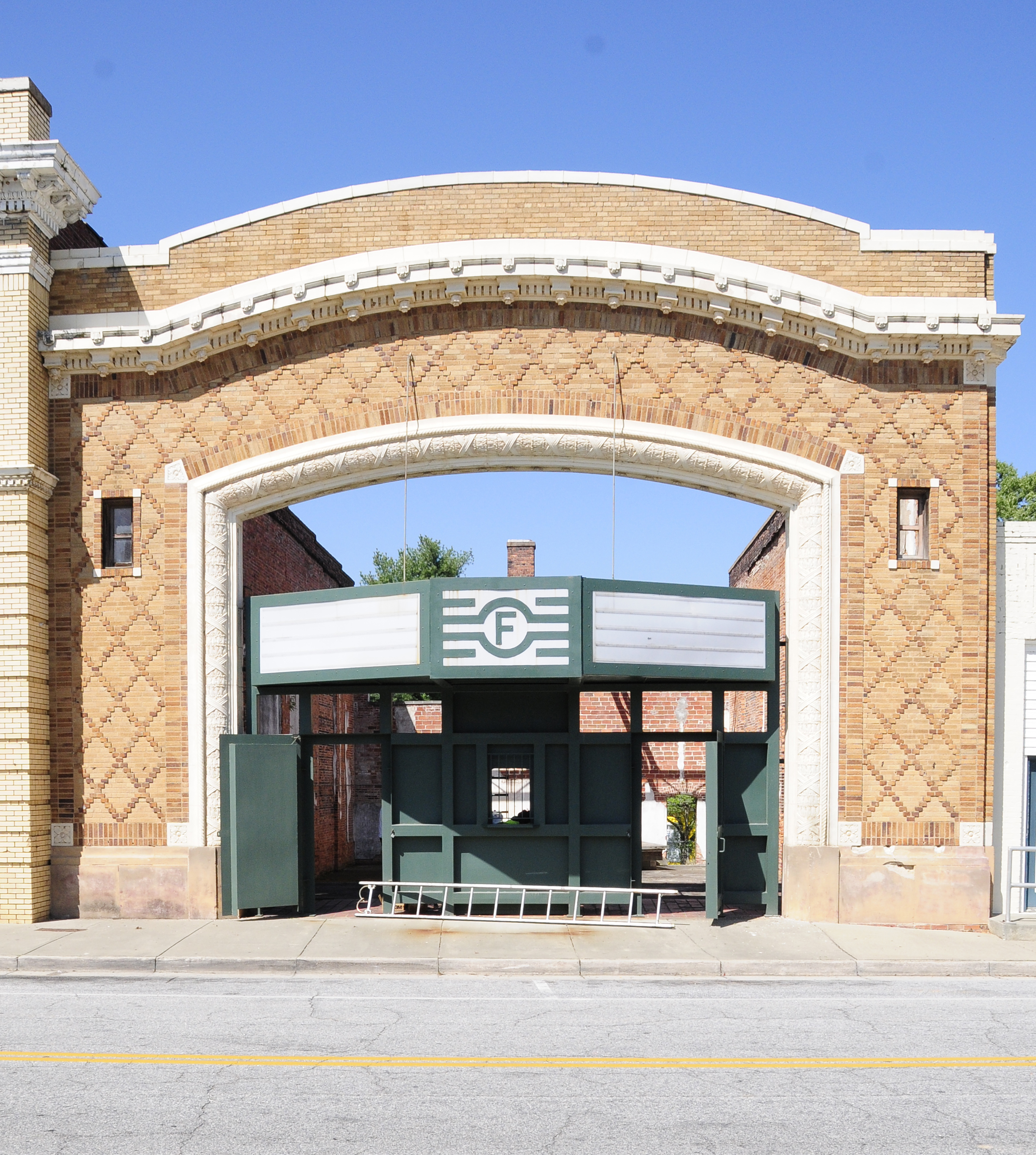
- Republic Theater, April 2012

- Location within South Carolina Location within the United States
- Location: 806 Dearborn St., Great Falls, South Carolina
- Coordinates: 34°34′2″N 80°53′24″W
- Area: less than one acre
- Built: 1921-1922
- Architect: Serrine, J.E.,& Co.
- NRHP reference No.: 80003665
- Added to NRHP: November 26, 1980

Republic Theater, also known as the Falls Theater, is a historic movie theater located at Great Falls, Chester County, South Carolina. It was built by Republic Cotton Mills in 1921–1922, and is a rectangular, light-colored brick structure on a limestone-colored stucco foundation. The façade has a large segmental arch entrance framed by terra cotta decoration and a molded terra cotta cornice. The theater closed in 1974.

It was listed on the National Register of Historic Places in 1980.
