= Great Falls station (South Carolina) =

- Great Falls Depot
- U.S. National Register of Historic Places
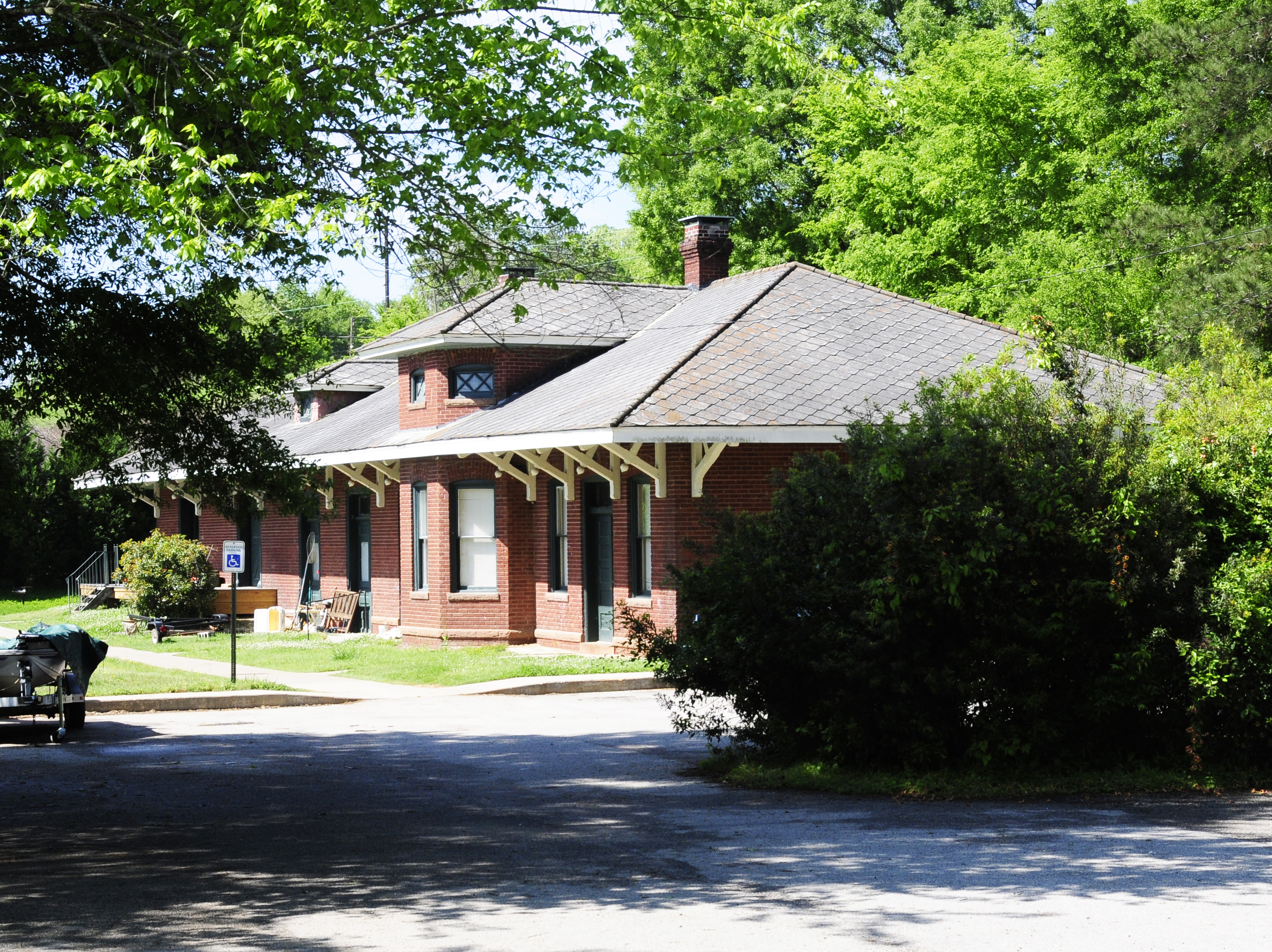
- Great Falls Depot, April 2012

- Location within South Carolina Location within the United States
- Location: Republic St., Great Falls, South Carolina
- Coordinates: 34°33′43″N 80°53′36″W
- Area: 1.9 acres (0.77 ha)
- Built: 1911-1912
- Architect: Williamson, A.H.
- NRHP reference No.: 80003664
- Added to NRHP: November 25, 1980

Great Falls Depot, also known as the Seaboard Air Line Railway Depot, is a historic train station located at Great Falls, Chester County, South Carolina. It was built in 1911–1912 by the Seaboard Air Line Railroad. It is a one-story, rectangular brick building, with a hipped roof and eaves that extend six feet beyond the building. The design of the waiting room area exemplifies the prevailing early-20th century practice of separate accommodations for blacks and whites.

It was listed on the National Register of Historic Places in 1980.

Preceding station	Seaboard Air Line Railroad	Following station
Terminus	Great Falls Branch	Catawba Terminus
