= Colvin–Fant–Durham Farm Complex =

Historic district in South Carolina, United States

- U.S. National Register of Historic Places
- U.S. Historic district
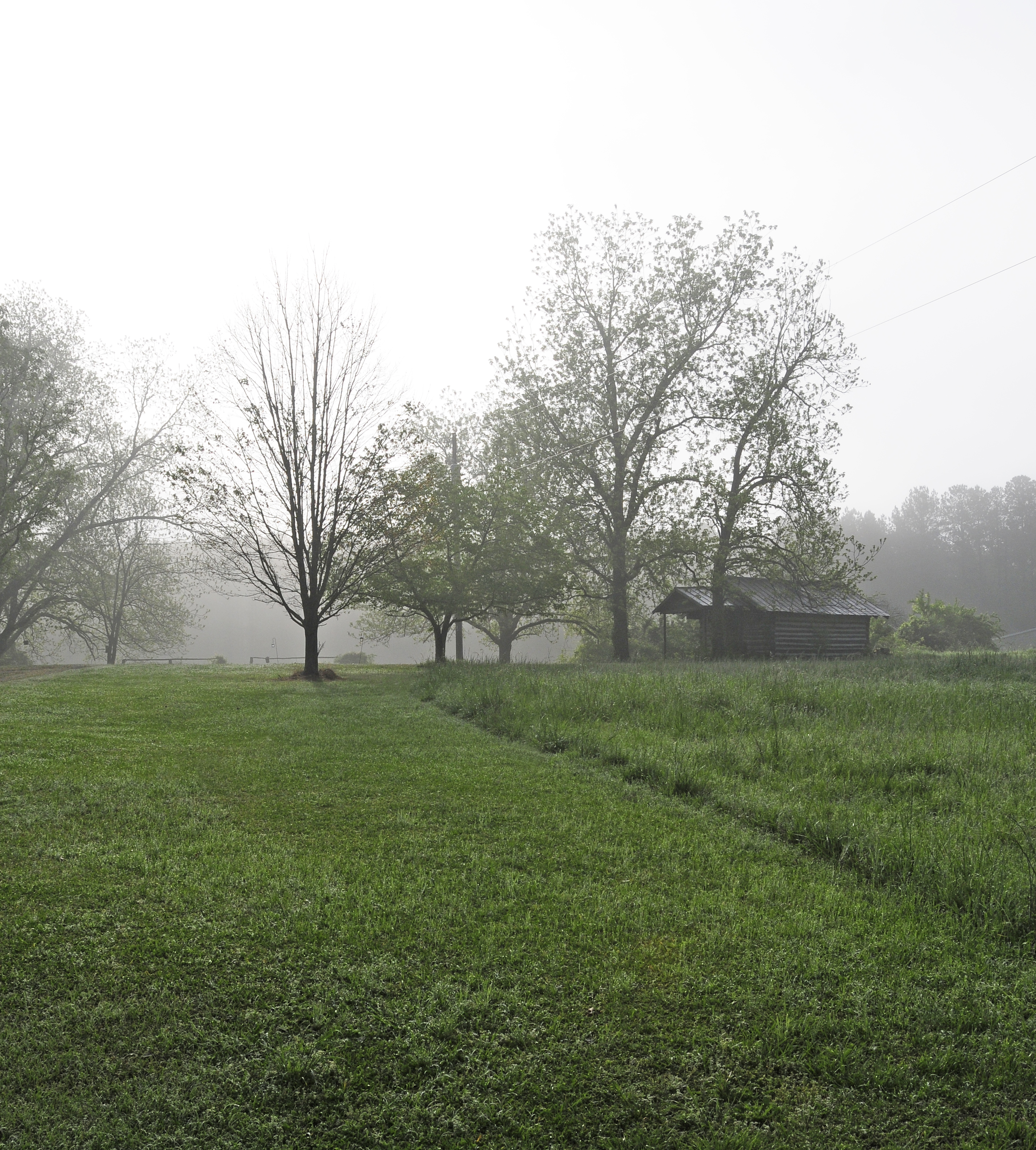
- Colvin–Fant–Durham Farm Complex, April 2012

- Location within South Carolina Location within the United States
- Location: Eastern side of South Carolina Highway 22, approximately 1 mile west of its junction with South Carolina Highway 16, near Chester, South Carolina
- Coordinates: 34°34′53″N 81°15′44″W
- Area: 19.5 acres (7.9 ha)
- Built: c. 1835, 1890
- Architectural style: Greek Revival, Federal, Transitional Fed/Gk Revival
- NRHP reference No.: 92000961
- Added to NRHP: July 30, 1992

Colvin–Fant–Durham Farm Complex, also known as the Nicholas Colvin House and Durham House, is a historic home and farm complex and national historic district located near Chester, Chester County, South Carolina. The district encompasses six contributing buildings. The house was built about 1835, and is a vernacular farmhouse with transitional Federal and early Greek Revival detailing. The house consists of a two-story, hall and parlor plan, frame main block and a one-story, frame dining room and kitchen ell, which was added in the late-19th century. The property also includes a smokehouse, well house/power house, mule barn, tenant house, and a log cottonseed house.

It was listed on the National Register of Historic Places in 1992.
