= Great Falls Downtown Historic District =

Historic district in South Carolina, United States

- U.S. National Register of Historic Places
- U.S. Historic district
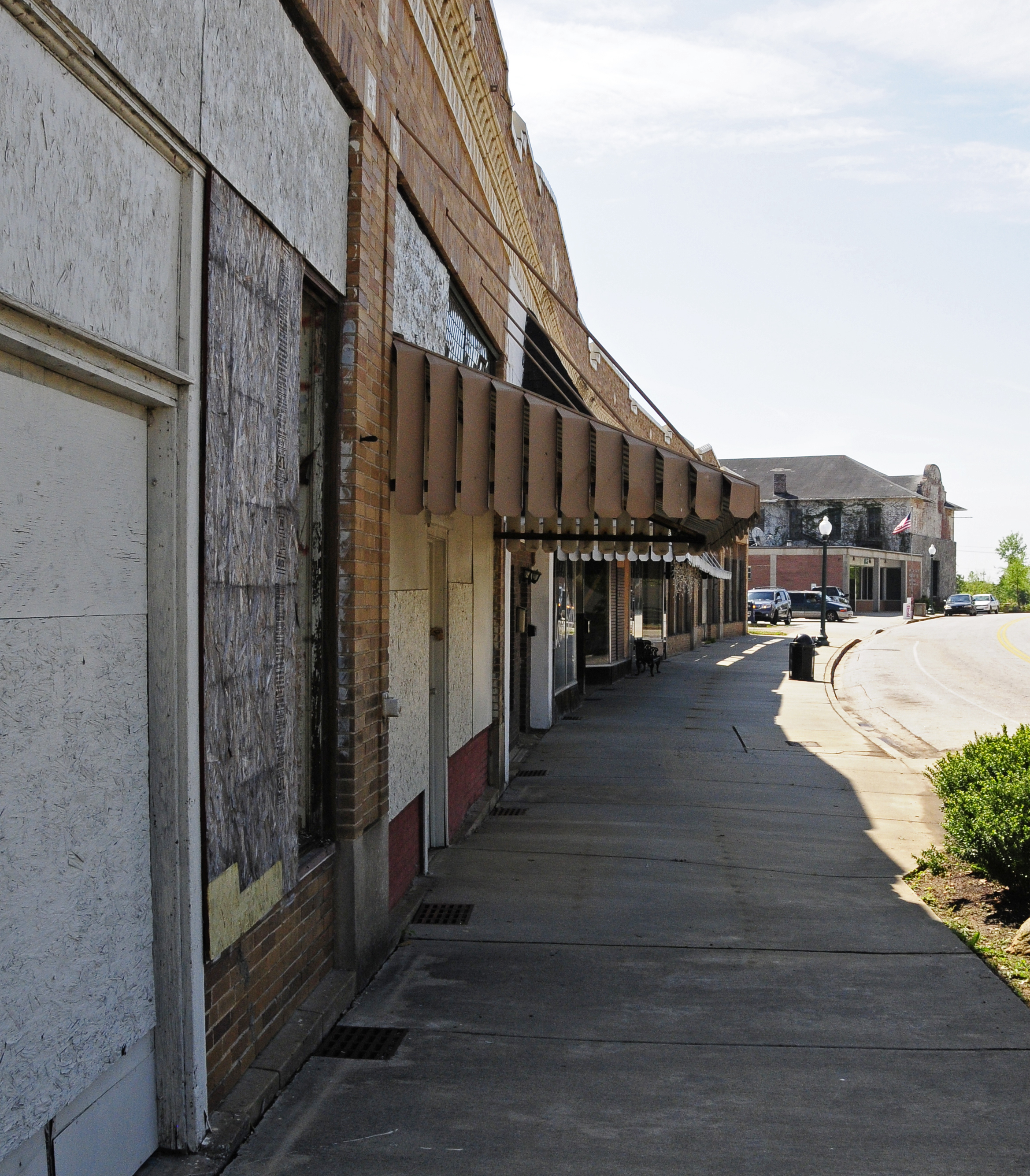
- Great Falls Downtown Historic District, April 2012

- Location within South Carolina Location within the United States
- Location: Dearborn St. between Church and Republic St., Great Falls, South Carolina
- Coordinates: 34°34′03″N 80°53′24″W
- Area: 12.6 acres (5.1 ha)
- Architect: Sirrine, Joseph Emory; Potter & Shackleford
- Architectural style: Late 19th And 20th Century Revivals
- NRHP reference No.: 00000588
- Added to NRHP: June 2, 2000

Great Falls Downtown Historic District is a national historic district located at Great Falls, Chester County, South Carolina. The district encompasses 14 contributing buildings in the central business district of Great Falls. They were built between about 1910 and 1930, and consist of the buildings constructed by the Republic Textile Mills Company to provide a commercial area to meet the needs of the mill workers and their families.

It was listed on the National Register of Historic Places in 2000.
