= Great Falls, South Carolina =

- Town
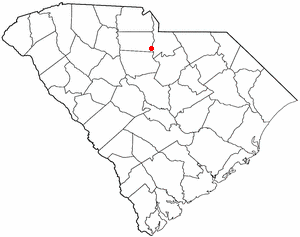
- Location of Great Falls, South Carolina
- Coordinates: 34°34′31″N 80°54′17″W
- Country: United States
- State: South Carolina
- County: Chester

Area
  - Total: 4.38 sq mi (11.34 km^{2})
  - Land: 4.24 sq mi (10.98 km^{2})
  - Water: 0.14 sq mi (0.36 km^{2})
- Elevation: 410 ft (120 m)

Population (2020)
  - Total: 1,951
  - Density: 460/sq mi (177.7/km^{2})
- Time zone: UTC−5 (Eastern (EST))
  - Summer (DST): UTC−4 (EDT)
- ZIP code: 29055
- Area codes: 803, 839
- FIPS code: 45-30490
- GNIS feature ID: 2406608
- Website: https://www.greatfalls-sc.org/

Great Falls is a town in southeastern Chester County, South Carolina, United States and is located fourteen miles southwest of Lancaster, South Carolina. The population was 1,951 at the 2020 census.

== History ==
The Great Falls Depot, Great Falls Downtown Historic District, and Republic Theater are listed on the National Register of Historic Places. The town council of Great Falls was the defendant-respondent found to have violated the Establishment Clause through their invocation of Christian prayer before meetings.

== Geography ==
According to the United States Census Bureau, the town has a total area of 4.4 square miles (11 km^{2}), of which, 4.2 square miles (11 km^{2}) of it is land and 0.1 square miles (0.26 km^{2}) of it (3.19%) is water.

== Demographics ==
Historical population
Census	Pop.	Note	%±
1950	3,533		—
1960	3,030		−14.2%
1970	2,727		−10.0%
1980	2,601		−4.6%
1990	2,307		−11.3%
2000	2,194		−4.9%
2010	1,979		−9.8%
2020	1,951		−1.4%
U.S. Decennial Census

=== 2020 census ===
Great Falls racial composition
Race	Num.	Perc.
White (non-Hispanic)	1,190	60.99%
Black or African American (non-Hispanic)	644	33.01%
Native American	5	0.26%
Asian	5	0.26%
Pacific Islander	1	0.05%
Other/Mixed	88	4.51%
Hispanic or Latino	18	0.92%

As of the 2020 United States census, there were 1,951 people, 730 households, and 454 families residing in the town.

=== 2000 census ===
As of the census of 2000, there were 2,194 people, 892 households, and 595 families living in the town. The population density was 516.8 inhabitants per square mile (199.5/km^{2}). There were 1,041 housing units at an average density of 245.2 per square mile (94.7/km^{2}). The racial makeup of the town was 71.01% White, 27.94% African American, 0.27% Native American, 0.23% Asian, 0.36% from other races, and 0.18% from two or more races. Hispanic or Latino of any race were 0.73% of the population.

There were 892 households, out of which 33.1% had children under the age of 18 living with them, 41.1% were married couples living together, 20.2% had a female householder with no husband present, and 33.2% were non-families. 30.9% of all households were made up of individuals, and 17.2% had someone living alone who was 65 years of age or older. The average household size was 2.46 and the average family size was 3.05.

In the town, the population was spread out, with 28.0% under the age of 18, 8.6% from 18 to 24, 25.9% from 25 to 44, 20.4% from 45 to 64, and 17.2% who were 65 years of age or older. The median age was 35 years. For every 100 females, there were 89.1 males. For every 100 females age 18 and over, there were 82.2 males.

The median income for a household in the town was $24,758, and the median income for a family was $31,683. Males had a median income of $27,336 versus $22,070 for females. The per capita income for the town was $13,266. About 16.4% of families and 18.1% of the population were below the poverty line, including 23.9% of those under age 18 and 20.4% of those age 65 or over.

== Education ==
Great Falls has a public library, a branch of the Chester County Library System.

== Notable residents ==
- Cal Cooper, former Major League Baseball pitcher
- Torrey Craig, NBA player
- Banks McFadden, All-American football player at Clemson University
