= Chester Catawba Regional Airport =

Airport in South Carolina, United States

- IATA: none; ICAO: KDCM; FAA LID: DCM

Summary
- Airport type: Public
- Owner: County of Chester
- Serves: Chester, South Carolina
- Elevation AMSL: 656 ft (200 m)
- Coordinates: 34°47′22″N 081°11′45″W
- Interactive map of Chester Catawba Regional Airport

Runways
Direction	Length		Surface
Direction	ft	m	Surface
5/23	4,998	1,523	Asphalt
17/35	5,000	1,524	Asphalt

Statistics (2009)
- Aircraft operations: 8,400
- Based aircraft: 31
- Source: Federal Aviation Administration

Chester Catawba Regional Airport (ICAO: KDCM, FAA LID: DCM, formerly 9A6) is a county-owned public-use airport located five nautical miles (9 km) north of the central business district of Chester, a city in Chester County, South Carolina, United States. It is technically a "regional" airport, but does not have a scheduled air service; it is mainly for the use of private aircraft for residents of Chester County. According to the FAA's National Plan of Integrated Airport Systems for 2009–2013, it is categorized as a general aviation facility.

Although many U.S. airports use the same three-letter location identifier for the FAA and IATA, this facility is assigned DCM by the FAA but has no designation from the IATA (which assigned DCM to Mazamet Airport in Castres, France).

== Facilities and aircraft ==
Chester Catawba Regional Airport covers an area of 1,047 acres (424 ha) at an elevation of 656 feet (200 m) above mean sea level. It has two asphalt paved runways: 5/23 is 4,998 by 100 feet (1,523 x 30 m) and 17/35 is 5,000 by 100 feet (1,524 x 30 m).

For the 12-month period ending August 27, 2009, the airport had 8,400 general aviation aircraft operations, an average of 23 per day. At that time there were 31 aircraft based at this airport: 97% single-engine and 3% multi-engine.

== See also ==
- List of airports in South Carolina
