= Chester, South Carolina =

- City
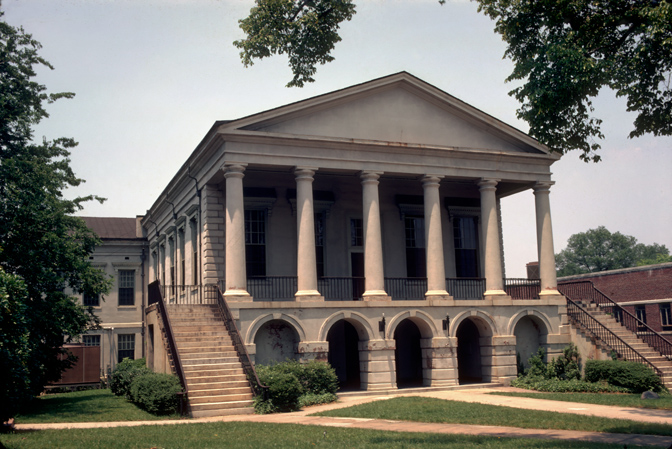
- Chester County Courthouse, built in 1852

- Seal
- Nicknames: The Picture Perfect City; The Little City on the Big Hill
- Motto: "At The Center Of It All"
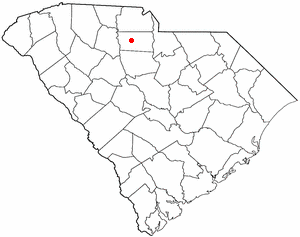
- Location of Chester, South Carolina
- Coordinates: 34°42′18″N 81°12′48″W
- Country: United States
- State: South Carolina
- County: Chester

Government
  - Type: Council

Area
  - Total: 3.31 sq mi (8.56 km^{2})
  - Land: 3.31 sq mi (8.56 km^{2})
  - Water: 0 sq mi (0.00 km^{2})
- Elevation: 535 ft (163 m)

Population (2020)
  - Total: 5,269
  - Density: 1,593.9/sq mi (615.42/km^{2})
- Time zone: UTC−5 (Eastern (EST))
  - Summer (DST): UTC−4 (EDT)
- ZIP code: 29706
- Area codes: 803, 839
- FIPS code: 45-14095
- GNIS feature ID: 2404043
- Website: www.chestersc.org

Chester is a small rural city in Chester County, South Carolina, United States. As of the 2020 census, Chester had a population of 5,269. It is the county seat of Chester County. The community was segregated. Many African Americans, including the principal and teachers at Finley School, lived in East Chester.

== History ==
While being transported to Richmond, Virginia, for his trial for treason, former Vice-President Aaron Burr passed through Chester. Burr "flung himself from his horse and cried for a rescue, but the officer commanding the escort seized him, threw him back like a child into the saddle, and marched on." The large stone he stood on has been inscribed and is preserved in the town center, and is known locally as the Aaron Burr Rock.

Chester was home to Brainerd Institute, a school for African American children.

The Catholic Presbyterian Church, Chester City Hall and Opera House, Chester Historic District, Colvin-Fant-Durham Farm Complex, Fishdam Ford, Kumler Hall, Lewis Inn, and McCollum Mound are listed on the National Register of Historic Places.

== Geography and climate ==
Chester is located just west of the center of Chester County. U.S. Route 321 bypasses the city to the west and the south, leading north 22 miles (35 km) to York and south 25 miles (40 km) to Winnsboro. South Carolina Highway 9 passes through the city center and leads east 11 miles (18 km) to Interstate 77 near Richburg and west 49 miles (79 km) to Spartanburg. Highways 72 and 121 lead northeast 19 miles (31 km) to Rock Hill and southwest 28 miles (45 km) to Whitmire.

According to the United States Census Bureau, the city has a total area of 3.3 square miles (8.5 km^{2}), all of it land.

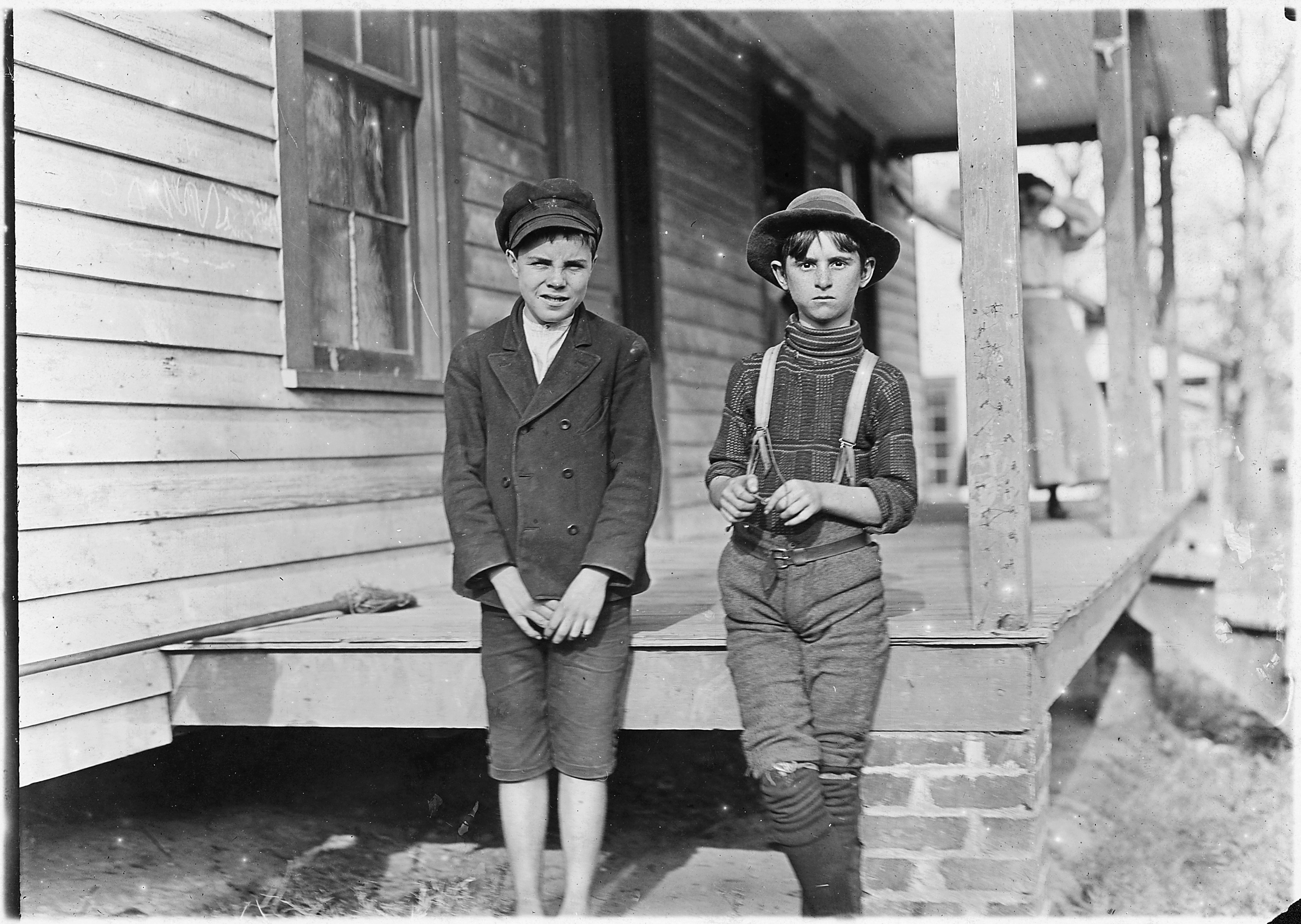
Young mill workers in Chester, 1908, photographed by Lewis Hine

Climate data for Chester, South Carolina, normals 1981–2010, extremes 1923-present
Month	Jan	Feb	Mar	Apr	May	Jun	Jul	Aug	Sep	Oct	Nov	Dec	Year
Record high °F (°C)	82 (28)	83 (28)	88 (31)	96 (36)	102 (39)	105 (41)	106 (41)	106 (41)	105 (41)	100 (38)	90 (32)	80 (27)	106 (41)
Mean daily maximum °F (°C)	52.1 (11.2)	56.4 (13.6)	64.7 (18.2)	73.6 (23.1)	80.7 (27.1)	87.5 (30.8)	90.5 (32.5)	88.9 (31.6)	82.9 (28.3)	73.4 (23.0)	64.2 (17.9)	54.4 (12.4)	72.4 (22.5)
Mean daily minimum °F (°C)	29.0 (−1.7)	31.4 (−0.3)	37.9 (3.3)	45.6 (7.6)	55.6 (13.1)	64.9 (18.3)	68.7 (20.4)	67.8 (19.9)	60.6 (15.9)	48.0 (8.9)	38.4 (3.6)	30.8 (−0.7)	48.2 (9.0)
Record low °F (°C)	−3 (−19)	−1 (−18)	4 (−16)	21 (−6)	28 (−2)	38 (3)	50 (10)	47 (8)	37 (3)	16 (−9)	9 (−13)	−5 (−21)	−5 (−21)
Average precipitation inches (mm)	4.13 (105)	3.78 (96)	4.16 (106)	3.38 (86)	2.99 (76)	4.37 (111)	4.01 (102)	4.85 (123)	3.66 (93)	3.35 (85)	3.48 (88)	3.59 (91)	45.75 (1,162)
Average snowfall inches (cm)	1.1 (2.8)	1.0 (2.5)	0.5 (1.3)	0 (0)	0 (0)	0 (0)	0 (0)	0 (0)	0 (0)	0 (0)	—	0.5 (1.3)	2.8 (7.1)
Source: NOAA

== Demographics ==
Historical population
Census	Pop.	Note	%±
1880	1,899		—
1890	2,703		42.3%
1900	4,075		50.8%
1910	4,754		16.7%
1920	5,557		16.9%
1930	5,528		−0.5%
1940	6,392		15.6%
1950	6,893		7.8%
1960	6,906		0.2%
1970	7,045		2.0%
1980	6,820		−3.2%
1990	7,158		5.0%
2000	6,476		−9.5%
2010	5,607		−13.4%
2020	5,269		−6.0%
U.S. Decennial Census

=== 2020 census ===
As of the 2020 census, Chester had a population of 5,269. The median age was 38.9 years. 25.8% of residents were under the age of 18 and 17.3% of residents were 65 years of age or older. For every 100 females there were 85.8 males, and for every 100 females age 18 and over there were 79.4 males age 18 and over.

98.8% of residents lived in urban areas, while 1.2% lived in rural areas.

There were 2,154 households in Chester, of which 32.5% had children under the age of 18 living in them. Of all households, 25.0% were married-couple households, 21.3% were households with a male householder and no spouse or partner present, and 46.4% were households with a female householder and no spouse or partner present. About 33.0% of all households were made up of individuals and 14.2% had someone living alone who was 65 years of age or older.

There were 2,516 housing units, of which 14.4% were vacant. The homeowner vacancy rate was 1.7% and the rental vacancy rate was 9.3%.

Racial composition as of the 2020 census
Race	Number	Percent
White	1,488	28.2%
Black or African American	3,461	65.7%
American Indian and Alaska Native	15	0.3%
Asian	42	0.8%
Native Hawaiian and Other Pacific Islander	2	0.0%
Some other race	51	1.0%
Two or more races	210	4.0%
Hispanic or Latino (of any race)	120	2.3%

=== 2000 census ===
As of the census of 2000, there were 6,476 people, 2,465 households, and 1,639 families residing in the city. The population density was 2,042.8 inhabitants per square mile (788.7/km^{2}). There were 2,774 housing units at an average density of 875.0 per square mile (337.8/km^{2}). The racial makeup of the city was 62.26% African American, 36.37% White, 0.15% Native American, 0.28% Asian, 0.03% Pacific Islander, 0.25% from other races, and 0.66% from two or more races. Hispanic or Latino of any race were 0.83% of the population.

There were 2,465 households, out of which 31.8% had children under the age of 18 living with them, 35.4% were married couples living together, 26.4% had a female householder with no husband present, and 33.5% were non-families. 29.5% of all households were made up of individuals, and 11.4% had someone living alone who was 65 years of age or older. The average household size was 2.60 and the average family size was 3.24.

In the city, the population was spread out, with 29.3% under the age of 18, 9.3% from 18 to 24, 26.9% from 25 to 44, 22.5% from 45 to 64, and 12.1% who were 65 years of age or older. The median age was 34 years. For every 100 females, there were 88.1 males. For every 100 females age 18 and over, there were 80.1 males.

The median income for a household in the city was $27,518, and the median income for a family was $32,973. Males had a median income of $27,321 versus $20,802 for females. The per capita income for the city was $13,386. About 16.4% of families and 19.4% of the population were below the poverty line, including 28.3% of those under age 18 and 13.6% of those age 65 or over.

Chester is the center of an urban cluster with a total population of 11,140 (2000 census).

== Education ==
Chester has a public library, a branch of the Chester County Library System.

== Police ==
The Chester Police Department has a staff of three police officers.

The department includes gang, narcotics and road patrol units.

Although a tiny town, Chester suffers higher crime rates than the national average in all categories.

== In the media ==
Chiefs, a miniseries based on the novel by Stuart Woods, was filmed in Chester over the course of three months in 1983. It was nominated for three prime-time Emmy awards, and featured a star-studded cast including Charlton Heston, Keith Carradine, Brad Davis, Paul Sorvino, Billy Dee Williams, Paula Kelly and Danny Glover.

In 2014, a celebration of the filming of Chiefs was organized in Chester by Catherine Fleming Bruce in collaboration with local organizations. Among the presenters was author Stuart Woods. The Chester newspaper reprinted coverage of Woods' visit to the City on the occasion of his death in 2022.

== Notable people ==
- Debbie Allen (born 1950), actress, dancer, choreographer, television director and producer
- Vivian Ayers Allen (1923–2025), American poet, playwright, and classicist
- Sheldon Brown (born 1979), National Football League cornerback
- Marion Campbell (1929–2016), football player with various teams
- Devan Downey (born 1987), basketball player (born in Chester)
- John Dunovant (1825-1864), Confederate Brigadier General
- Allison Feaster (born 1976), basketball player in the WNBA
- Carroll Glenn (1918–1983), concert violinist
- James Hamilton (born 1938), attorney
- Robert W. Hemphill (1915-1983), U.S. Congressman and Federal District Court Judge
- J. Charles Jones (1937–2019), civil rights activist (born in Chester)
- Donnie McClurkin (born 1959), pastor and gospel singer
- Maurice Morris (born 1979), National Football League running back
- Ron Rash (born 1953), author of short stories
- Phylicia Rashad (born 1948), actress (The Cosby Show)
- Britt Robertson (born 1990), film actress (Tomorrowland)
- Elizabeth Talford Scott (1916–2011), artist (born in Chester)
