= Conway, South Carolina =

City in South Carolina, United States

Conway
- City
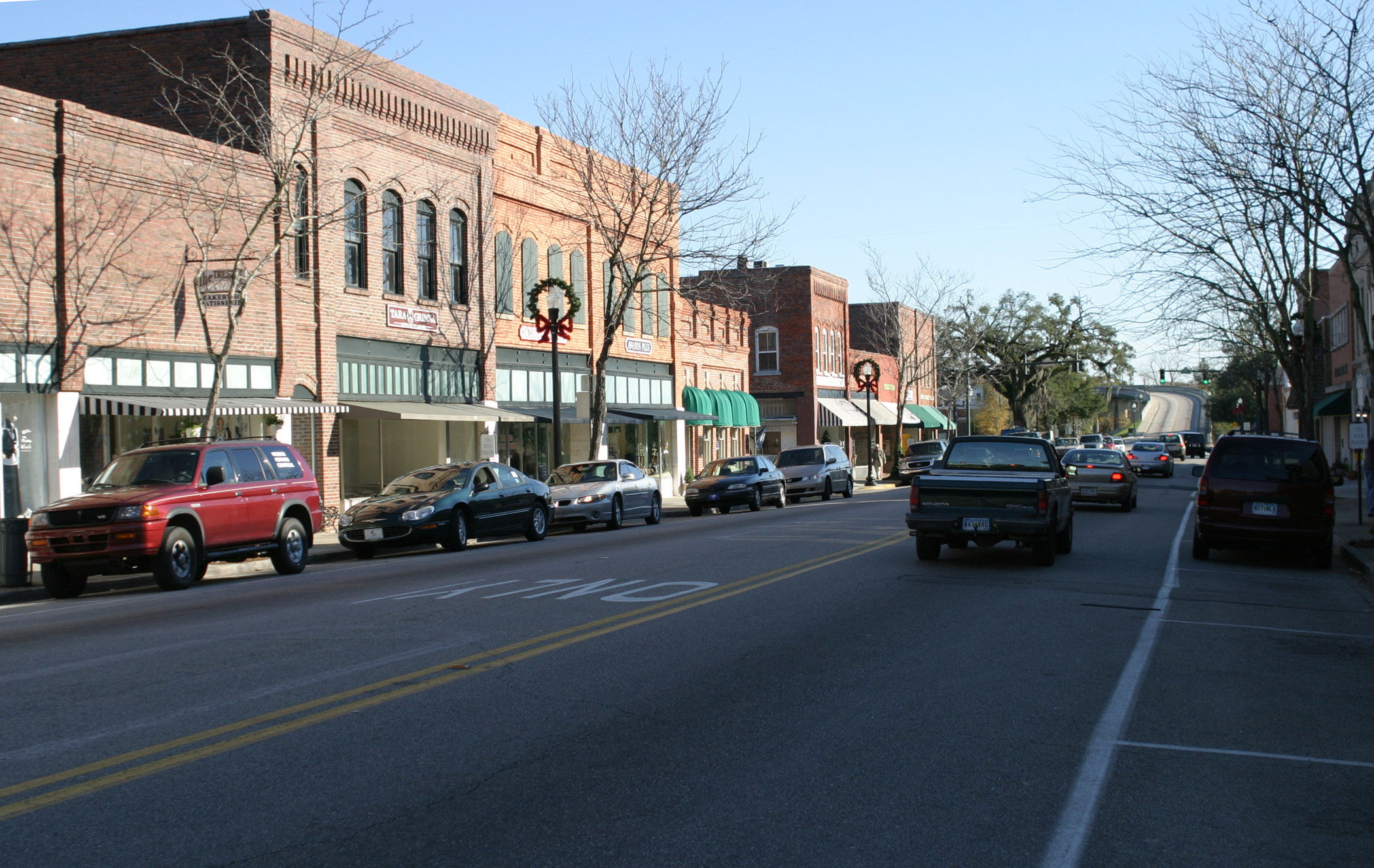
- Conway Downtown Historic District

- Flag Seal Logo
- Nickname: Historic Rivertown
- Interactive map of Conway
- Coordinates: 33°50′27″N 79°01′22″W
- Country: United States
- State: South Carolina
- County: Horry
- Founded: 1732
- Named for: General Robert Conway

Government
  - Mayor: Barbara Blain Bellamy

Area
  - Total: 25.41 sq mi (65.80 km^{2})
  - Land: 24.51 sq mi (63.47 km^{2})
  - Water: 0.90 sq mi (2.33 km^{2}) 3.54%
- Elevation: 16 ft (4.9 m)

Population (2020)
  - Total: 24,849
  - Density: 1,014.0/sq mi (391.49/km^{2})
- Time zone: UTC−5 (EST)
  - Summer (DST): UTC−4 (EDT)
- ZIP codes: 29526-29528
- Area codes: 843, 854
- FIPS code: 45-16405
- GNIS feature ID: 2404120
- Website: conwaysc.gov

Conway is a city in and the county seat of Horry County, South Carolina, United States. The population was 24,849 at the 2020 census, up from 17,103 in the 2010 census, making it the 18th-most populous city in the state. The city is part of the Myrtle Beach Metro Area. It is the home of Coastal Carolina University.

Numerous buildings and structures located in Conway are on the National Register of Historic Places. Among these is the City Hall building, designed by Robert Mills, architect of the Washington Monument. Since the completion of the Main Street USA project in the 1980s, Conway's downtown has been revitalized with shops and bistros. Highlighting the renovation of the downtown area is the Riverwalk, an area of restaurants which follows a stretch of the Waccamaw River that winds through Conway.

== History ==
Conway is one of the oldest towns in South Carolina. Early English colonists named the village "Kings Town" but soon changed it to "Kingston". The town was founded in 1732 as part of Royal Governor Robert Johnson's Township Scheme. It was laid out on a bluff overlooking the Waccamaw River in what is now known as Horry County.

For three decades, from the 1730s to the 1750s, King George II was very popular in the area. The King's birthday was one of the most widely celebrated holidays during that time. However, his successor King George III quickly grew unpopular with the townspeople. By the 1770s, the region of South Carolina in which Kingston was located was overwhelmingly English, though there were also small numbers of Huguenots and Scots-Irish people. English-Americans in Kingston were very sympathetic to rebels in Charleston over the issue of taxation without representation. When the Royal Governor Lord William Campbell fled Charleston, the people of Kingston celebrated.

Many area residents fought in the American Revolution, and small engagements were fought near Kingston at Bear Bluff and at Black Lake. Francis Marion, who was known as the "Swamp Fox", had an encampment near Kingston just across the Waccamaw River. The areas of Kingston and Charles Town were communities with a higher population of Tories than many other Colonial American towns during the Revolutionary War era.

Horry County was created in 1801, and its courthouse was established in Kingston. The name "Kingston" was later changed to "Conwayborough", to honor local hero General Robert Conway. In 1883, the South Carolina General Assembly changed the name of the town to "Conway".

== Geography ==
Conway is situated on the South Carolina Coastal Plain on the western banks of the Waccamaw River, and is approximately 14 miles (23 km) from the Atlantic Ocean. U.S. Route 701, U.S. Route 501, and U.S. Route 378 pass through Conway.

According to the United States Census Bureau, the city has a total area of 25.41 square miles (65.8 km^{2}), of which 24.51 square miles (63.5 km^{2}) is land and 0.90 square miles (2.3 km^{2}) (3.54%) is water. The downtown is sited on the west bank of the Waccamaw River where it is joined by a creek called Kingston Lake. The Waccamaw flows south to the Pee Dee River and ultimately Winyah Bay at Georgetown.

=== Climate ===
Conway has a humid subtropical climate, with mild winters and hot, humid summers. The local climate allows plants like kale to survive deep into the winter months, despite the lower amount of light. 60's and 70's weather are not rare during the months of December, January, and February. Spring starts in March, as usual for the climatic schedule of the area. Comparable major metro areas for this climate of Conway include Montgomery, Alabama and Jackson, Mississippi.

Climate data for Conway, South Carolina (1991–2020 normals, extremes 1893–2014)
Month	Jan	Feb	Mar	Apr	May	Jun	Jul	Aug	Sep	Oct	Nov	Dec	Year
Record high °F (°C)	83 (28)	85 (29)	96 (36)	96 (36)	101 (38)	106 (41)	105 (41)	106 (41)	105 (41)	98 (37)	89 (32)	84 (29)	106 (41)
Mean maximum °F (°C)	74.6 (23.7)	77.9 (25.5)	82.9 (28.3)	87.9 (31.1)	93.0 (33.9)	97.2 (36.2)	98.7 (37.1)	97.6 (36.4)	93.5 (34.2)	87.9 (31.1)	81.4 (27.4)	76.6 (24.8)	100.1 (37.8)
Mean daily maximum °F (°C)	58.1 (14.5)	60.6 (15.9)	68.0 (20.0)	75.8 (24.3)	82.6 (28.1)	87.7 (30.9)	90.8 (32.7)	89.1 (31.7)	84.8 (29.3)	76.9 (24.9)	68.2 (20.1)	60.6 (15.9)	75.3 (24.1)
Daily mean °F (°C)	46.7 (8.2)	49.4 (9.7)	55.8 (13.2)	63.8 (17.7)	71.6 (22.0)	78.2 (25.7)	81.6 (27.6)	80.2 (26.8)	75.4 (24.1)	65.9 (18.8)	56.1 (13.4)	49.6 (9.8)	64.5 (18.1)
Mean daily minimum °F (°C)	35.2 (1.8)	38.1 (3.4)	43.6 (6.4)	51.9 (11.1)	60.6 (15.9)	68.7 (20.4)	72.4 (22.4)	71.2 (21.8)	66.0 (18.9)	54.8 (12.7)	44.1 (6.7)	38.6 (3.7)	53.8 (12.1)
Mean minimum °F (°C)	19.9 (−6.7)	24.6 (−4.1)	29.5 (−1.4)	37.5 (3.1)	46.8 (8.2)	58.4 (14.7)	65.3 (18.5)	63.1 (17.3)	52.8 (11.6)	39.5 (4.2)	31.1 (−0.5)	22.3 (−5.4)	17.6 (−8.0)
Record low °F (°C)	4 (−16)	11 (−12)	12 (−11)	22 (−6)	34 (1)	42 (6)	51 (11)	51 (11)	41 (5)	22 (−6)	15 (−9)	6 (−14)	4 (−16)
Average precipitation inches (mm)	4.28 (109)	3.57 (91)	3.76 (96)	3.16 (80)	3.33 (85)	5.34 (136)	6.89 (175)	7.81 (198)	6.00 (152)	3.83 (97)	3.21 (82)	4.03 (102)	55.21 (1,402)
Average precipitation days (≥ 0.01 in)	9.4	7.6	8.0	6.9	8.1	10.6	10.7	10.9	8.1	6.4	6.6	8.0	101.3
Source: NOAA (mean maxima/minima 1981–2010)

== Demographics ==
Historical population
Census	Pop.	Note	%±
1860	476		—
1870	696		46.2%
1880	575		−17.4%
1890	677		17.7%
1900	705		4.1%
1910	1,228		74.2%
1920	1,969		60.3%
1930	3,011		52.9%
1940	5,066		68.2%
1950	6,073		19.9%
1960	8,563		41.0%
1970	8,151		−4.8%
1980	10,240		25.6%
1990	9,819		−4.1%
2000	11,788		20.1%
2010	17,103		45.1%
2020	24,849		45.3%
2025 (est.)	30,627	▲	23.3%
U.S. Decennial Census

=== 2020 census ===
Racial composition as of the 2020 census
Race	Number	Percent
White	15,337	61.7%
Black or African American	7,347	29.6%
American Indian and Alaska Native	87	0.4%
Asian	297	1.2%
Native Hawaiian and Other Pacific Islander	24	0.1%
Some other race	579	2.3%
Two or more races	1,178	4.7%
Hispanic or Latino (of any race)	1,176	4.7%

As of the 2020 census, Conway had a population of 24,849, 8,277 households, and 4,881 families residing in the city.

The median age was 30.4 years. 16.4% of residents were under the age of 18 and 17.4% of residents were 65 years of age or older. For every 100 females there were 83.0 males, and for every 100 females age 18 and over there were 80.1 males age 18 and over.

96.8% of residents lived in urban areas, while 3.2% lived in rural areas.

There were 8,277 households in Conway, of which 27.6% had children under the age of 18 living in them. Of all households, 41.2% were married-couple households, 17.0% were households with a male householder and no spouse or partner present, and 34.5% were households with a female householder and no spouse or partner present. About 26.5% of all households were made up of individuals and 11.5% had someone living alone who was 65 years of age or older.

There were 9,421 housing units, of which 12.1% were vacant. The homeowner vacancy rate was 2.3% and the rental vacancy rate was 12.8%.

=== 2000 census ===
At the 2000 census, there were 11,788 people, 4,259 households, and 2,942 families residing in the city. The population density was 927.8 inhabitants per square mile (358.2/km^{2}). There were 4,783 housing units at an average density of 376.5 per square mile (145.4/km^{2}). The racial makeup of the city was 55.82% White, 41.85% African American, 0.21% Native American, 0.74% Asian, 0.03% Pacific Islander, 0.64% from other races, and 0.72% from two or more races. Hispanic or Latino of any race were 1.87% of the population.

There were 4,259 households, out of which 32.8% had children under the age of 18 living with them, 42.3% were married couples living together, 23.3% had a female householder with no husband present, and 30.9% were non-families. 26.7% of all households were made up of individuals, and 9.9% had someone living alone who was 65 years of age or older. The average household size was 2.52 and the average family size was 3.02.

In the city, the population was spread out, with 25.1% under the age of 18, 15.8% from 18 to 24, 25.3% from 25 to 44, 20.2% from 45 to 64, and 13.6% who were 65 years of age or older. The median age was 33 years. For every 100 females, there were 83.2 males. For every 100 females age 18 and over, there were 75 males.

The median income for a household in the city was $32,155, and the median income for a family was $39,189. Males had a median income of $26,720 versus $21,310 for females. The per capita income for the city was $16,611. About 15.9% of families and 20.2% of the population were below the poverty line, including 32.9% of those under age 18 and 16.0% of those age 65 or over.

== Economy ==
Employers located in the Conway area include:

- New South Companies, Inc. (a subsidiary of Canfor)
- Vulcan Materials Company
- AVX Corporation

Grainger Generating Station was a coal fired power plant operated by Santee Cooper. It generated electricity from 1966 until its retirement in 2012.

== Arts and culture ==
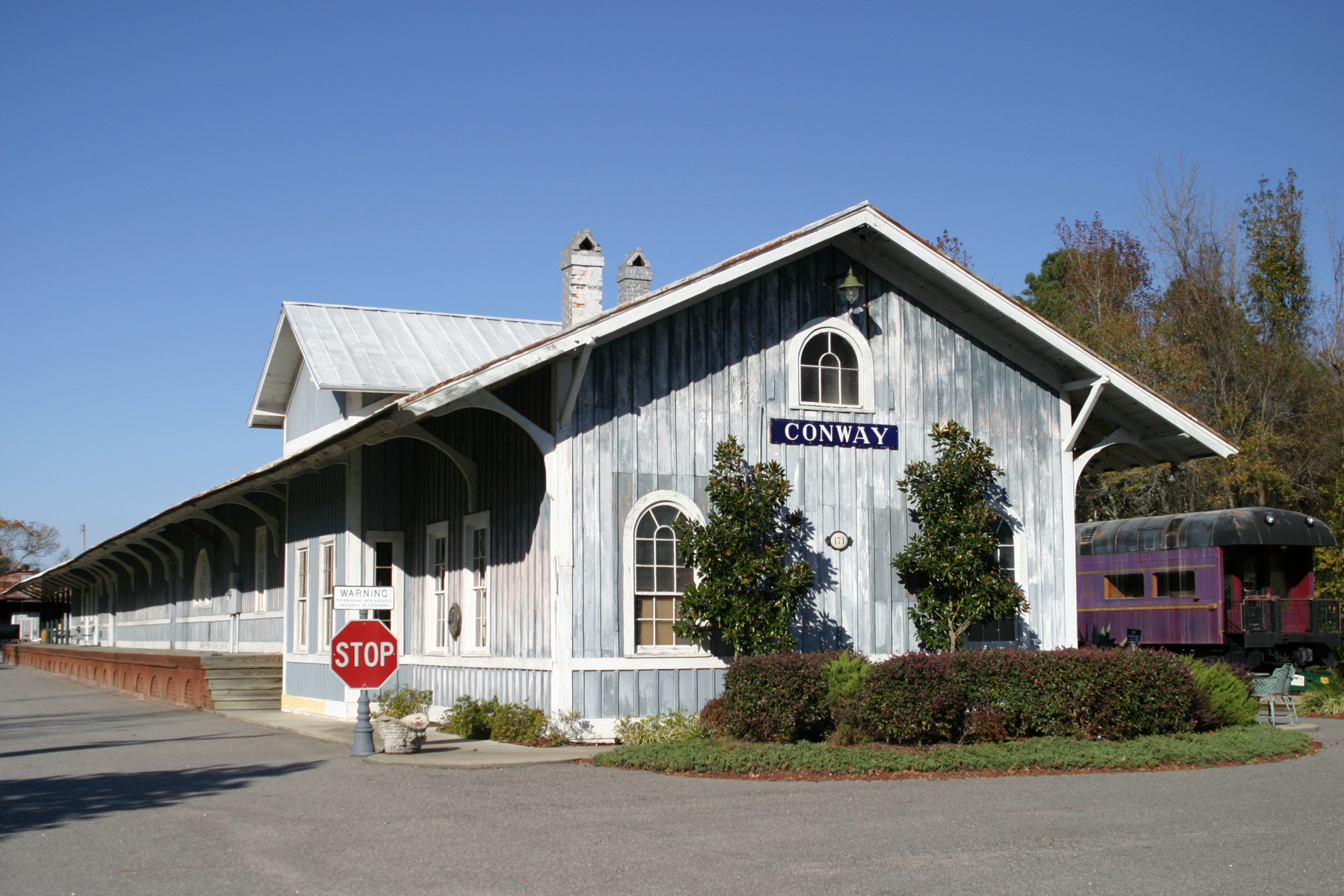
Former railroad station

Conway is the home of Kimbel Library and the Rebecca Randall Bryan Art Gallery at Coastal Carolina University. The gallery houses differing exhibits throughout the year.

== Sports ==
HTC Center is a 3,370-seat multi-purpose arena located on the campus of Coastal Carolina University in Conway. It is home to the university's men's and women's basketball teams, and the women's volleyball teams. It replaced Kimbel Arena for this purpose.

== Government ==
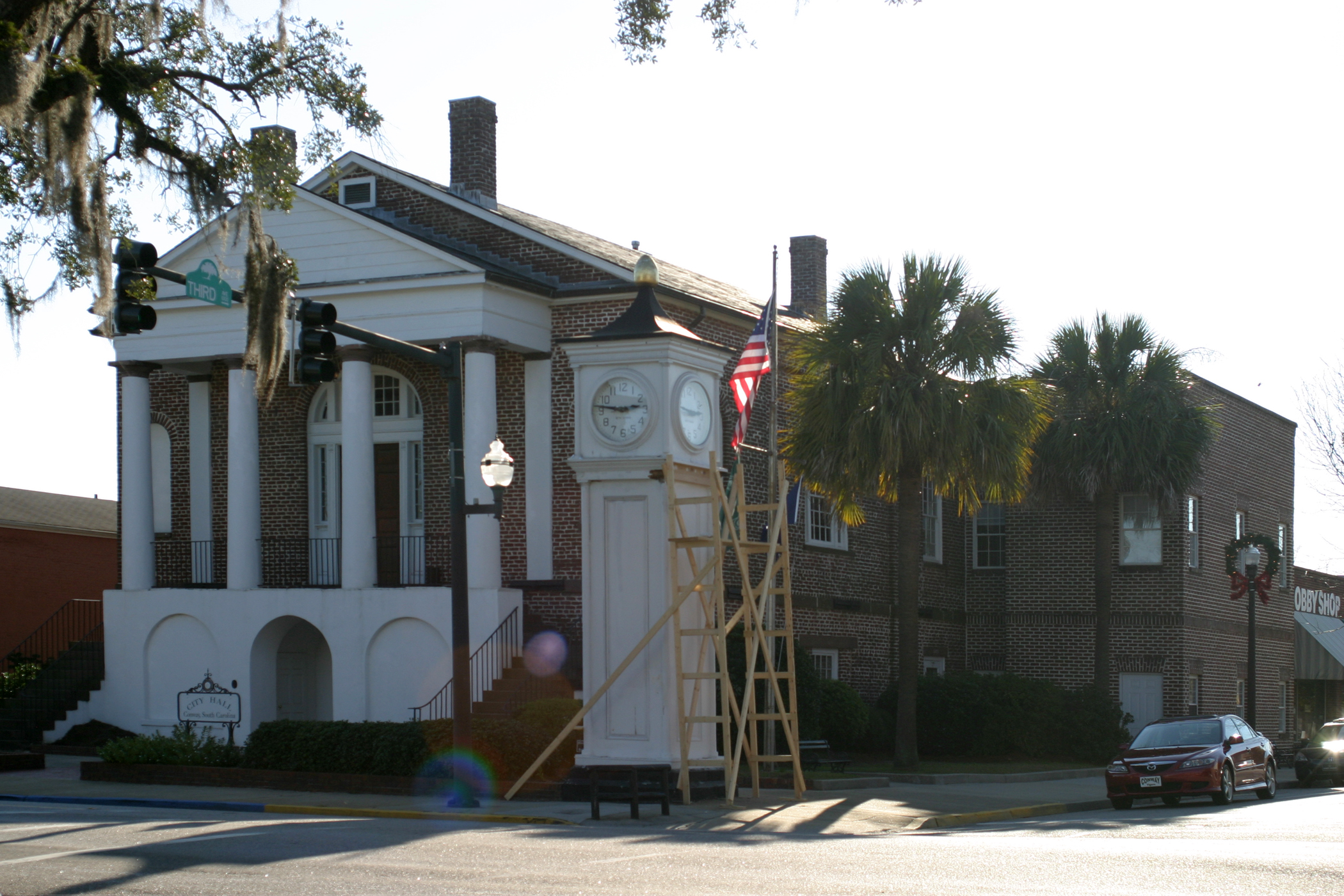
City Hall

The city is run by an elected mayor-council government system with one mayor and 6 council members. The current mayor is Barbara Blain who was first sworn in on January 4, 2016 and re-elected on January 6, 2020. The 6 council members are Amanda Butler, Julie Hardwick, Beth Helms, William Goldfinch IV, Justin Jordan, and Larry White. Council members are elected at large and serve staggered four year terms. Each member, including the mayor, has one vote in city matters. Council members meet twice a month; on the first and third Monday at 4:00 p.m. at Conway Council Chambers.

== Education ==
Most of the county is served by a single public school system, Horry County Schools. Private schools include Conway Christian School.

Conway is home to two major institutes of higher learning, Coastal Carolina University and Horry-Georgetown Technical College. It is also home to a branch of Webster University, an MBA graduate school, and North American Institute of Aviation (NAIA), a flight school.

Conway has a public library, a branch of the Horry County Memorial Library.

== Media ==
- The Chanticleer News (the student newspaper of Coastal Carolina University)
- Rivertown Radio
- Horry Independent

== Infrastructure ==
=== Transportation ===
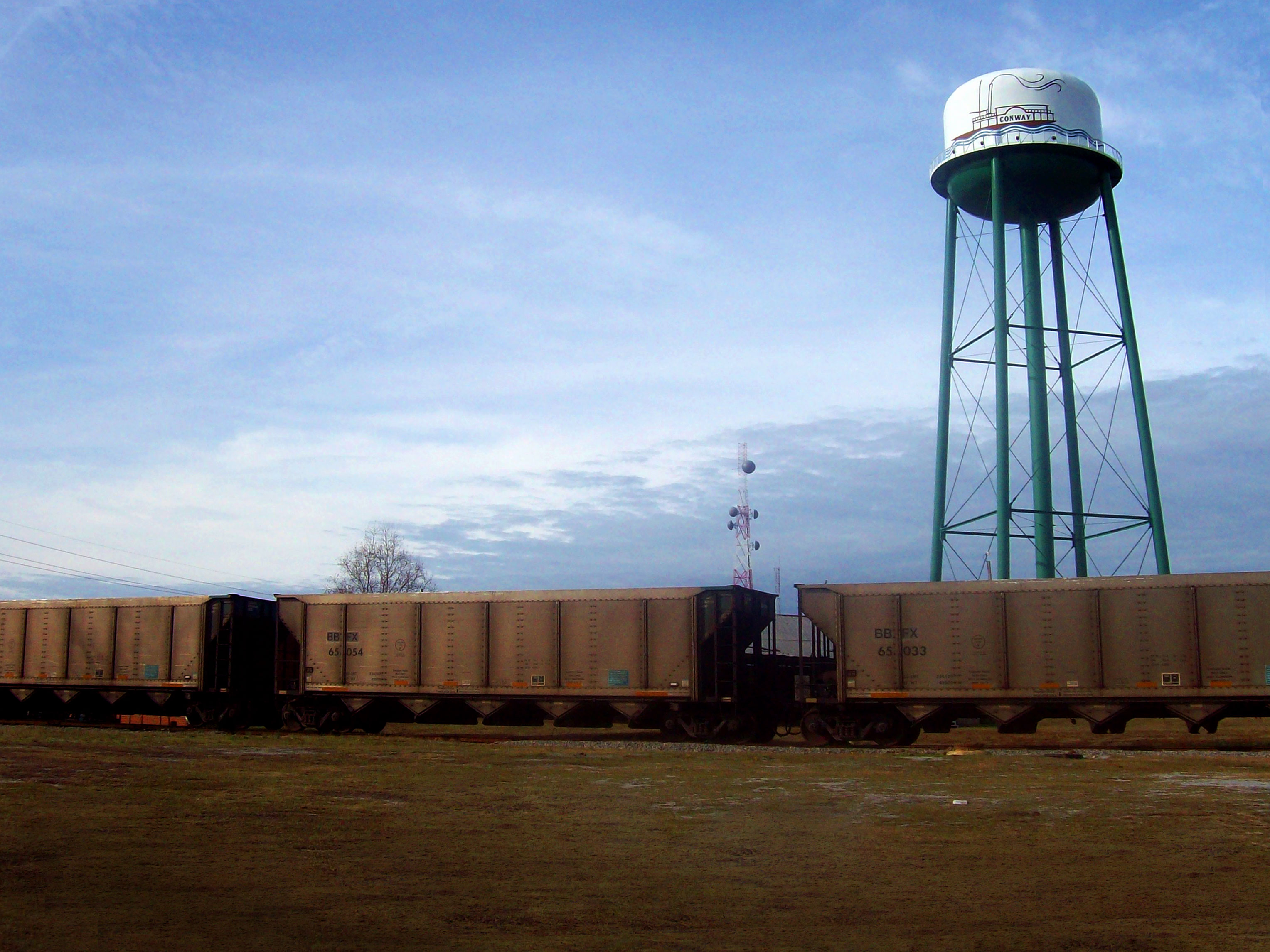
Trains in front of the Conway water tower

==== Air ====
Conway is home to the Conway–Horry County Airport (HYW), a small airport located 4 miles (6 km) west of town, along US 378.

==== Bus ====
A large part of Horry County is served by the Coast Regional Transit Authority (RTA), formerly known as the Waccamaw Regional Transit Authority and as Lymo. The primary station and offices are located in downtown Conway, near the historic district.

==== Railroads ====
R. J. Corman Railroad's Carolina Line is a short-line railroad which serves parts of North and South Carolina. Conway is located on the railroad's Chadbourn, NC–Myrtle Beach, SC branch. The historic Conway railroad depot is located along this branch, although the depot is now an office building.

== Notable people ==
- Bryant Barnhill, racing driver
- Scott Bessent, investor, hedge fund manager and 79th United States Secretary of the Treasury
- Bryan Edwards, American football player
- William Gibson, author, credited as the father of the cyberpunk genre of science fiction
- Junior Hemingway, former Michigan Wolverines wide receiver
- Tonka Hemingway, South Carolina Gamecocks defensive tackle
- Grant Holmes, professional baseball pitcher
- Edgar L. McGowan, former commissioner of the South Carolina Department of Labor
- Kristy McPherson, golfer on the LPGA Tour
- Allen Patrick, Oklahoma Sooners running back and NFL player
- Hunter Renfrow, American football player
- Sheri Reynolds, author and associate professor of Southern literature at Old Dominion University
- Nick Shalosky, first openly gay elected official in South Carolina
- Margot Stilley, actress and writer
- Duley Trucc, musical artist

== See also ==
- List of municipalities in South Carolina
- Conway is home to the Waccamaw Indian People, the original inhabitants of the area, who lived along the Waccamaw River.
