= Edgemoor =

Edgemoor may refer to any of the following:

== Places ==
- Edgemoor, Delaware, developed by the Edgemoor Iron Company
- Edgemoor, Bethesda, Maryland
- Edgemoor, South Carolina
- Edgemoor Dairy in Santee, California

== Other ==
- Edgemoor Infrastructure & Real Estate, a subsidiary of Clark Construction
