= Robert Mills =

Robert Mills may refer to:

- Rob Mills (born 1982), Australian musician and television presenter
- Robert Mills (architect) (1781–1855), American architect
- Robert Mills (physicist) (1927–1999), American physicist
- Robert William Mills (1777–1851), English politician
- Robert Mills (Louisiana politician), American politician in Louisiana
- Robby Mills (Robert Martin Mills, born 1967), American politician in Kentucky
- Robert P. Mills (1920–1986), American magazine editor
- Robert L. Mills (1916–2006), American president of Georgetown College
- Robert Mills (rower) (born 1957), Canadian Olympic rower
- Robert Mills (priest), dean of Dunedin, 1973–91
- SS Robert Mills, a Liberty ship, named for the architect

== See also ==
- Bob Mills (disambiguation)
