= North American Institute of Aviation =

Flight school in Conway, South Carolina

- Type: Private
- Established: 1972
- President: Benjamin J. Creel
- Administrative staff: Approx. 30 before training activities were suspended.
- Location: Conway, South Carolina, USA; 33.828°N 79.124°W
- Campus: County airport, 9,000 square feet (840 m^{2})
- Nickname: The Conway Bombers
- Website: www.naiasc.com

The North American Institute of Aviation (NAIA) was a private, FAA Part-141 flight school located in Conway, South Carolina, in the United States. Founded on July 7, 1972 in Hammonton, New Jersey, then later moved to South Carolina in 1978. NAIA operated out of the Conway-Horry County Airport where it was also the fixed-base operator (FBO). NAIA has also had a large campus and FBO in Las Cruces, New Mexico.

NAIA specialized in flight and aircraft maintenance training. The school had close connections to North European Aviation Resources (NEAR) of Vigra, Norway, and was for a period of time the ab-initio school of Scandinavian Airlines. The school subsequently commanded an excellent reputation in Northern Europe. The school concentrated its efforts on FAA Part-141 operations and their European JAR-FCL approved program in cooperation with NEAR, which maintained a representative at the school.

NAIA graduates work for airlines, aircraft manufacturers, training device manufacturers (TDMs) and other aviation companies worldwide.

NAIA ceased training operations September 5, 2008. The school was up for sale, and had been approached by potential buyers. Most staff members had their employment terminated in order to revert the operations into a pure FBO service. European program students have not yet been refunded for their training tuition, although some of the American students have been refunded due to an insurance policy maintained by the school. European program students were transferred to Pelican Flight Training Center and Hillsboro Aviation.

North American Institute of Aviation filed for Chapter 7 bankruptcy at a federal court in Columbia on February 16, 2009.

== Training programs offered ==
North American's Professional Pilot Program included the FAA Private Pilot License (PPL), Instrument Rating (IRA), Commercial Pilot License (CPL), Flight Instructor Certificate (CFI), Instrument Flight Instructor Certificate (CFII) and the Multi-Engine Rating courses. The JAR-FCL approved training syllabus used by the school in cooperation with NEAR was a derivative of the original SAS ab-initio program.

The school's Aviation Maintenance Technology Program included the training courses Airframe Systems and Components, Aircraft Structures, Reciprocating Powerplant Systems and Components and the Turbine Powerplant Systems and Components course. NAIA's School of Aviation Maintenance Technology also had an operational technical maintenance service which provided aircraft maintenance to the flight school's fleet as well as to the local aviation community.

== The fleet ==
North American operated until September 5, 2008, a fleet of 6 Cessna 152, 11 Cessna 172, 3 Cessna 172RG, 2 Piper Seminoles and one DA-40 Diamond Star. In early 2008 the school underwent operational tests of the Liberty XL2 as a replacement aircraft for the aging fleet. No purchase or lease of the Liberty was made. The average age of the fleet was 21.6 years per 2008. Upon closure of the school, the majority of the fleet was transferred to Pelican Flight Training Center where it continued to operate on lease from Christiansen Aviation. NAIA's Las Cruces' campus had a large fleet of Cessna 152s, Cessna 172s, Cessna 172RGs, Piper Seneca IIs, Piper Seminoles, and a Robinson R22 helicopter.

== Trivia ==
Students and alumni of North American are colloquially nicknamed "The Conway Bombers", pertaining to their historically often high activity level with aircraft departing from the home base with, what might appear as, similar time-spacing between each flight as that used by aircraft of World War II bomber squadrons. Several flights often went to similar destinations at the same time, normally due to a class being in the process of accomplishing the required 37 hours of solo cross-country flights.

A popular dining option for students and instructors alike was Kyoto Fantasy Express (Mon Cafe Japanese, as of late 2008). It was situated next to the Conway Walmart, which was on the extended centerline of the Conway-Horry County Airport's runway 22. This led to the coining of the term "Kyoto Arrival" for the visual approach to that runway, mimicking the often creative names of STARs at major airports.

At the Las Cruces campus, the opening of a new popular, express restaurant in the main school building in 1990 prompted a schoolwide restaurant naming contest. The contest was open to staff and students alike. After voting on the restaurant name, "Crosswinds Grill," was announced in acknowledgment of the occasional strong, Las Cruces airport desert winds.
