= Conway Downtown Historic District =

Historic district in South Carolina, United States

- U.S. National Register of Historic Places
- U.S. Historic district
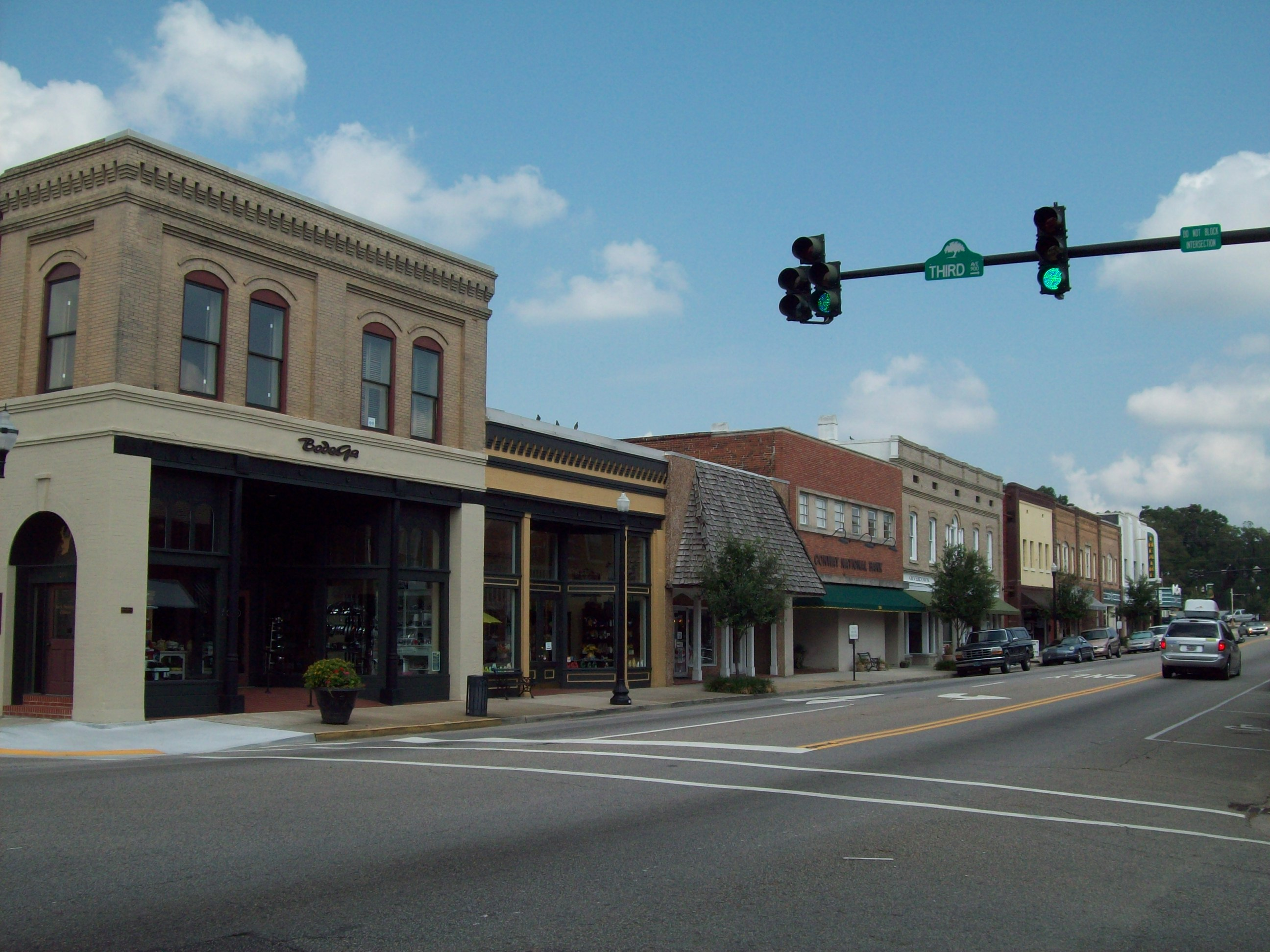
- Main Street, Conway Downtown Historic District, June 2010

- Location within South Carolina Location within the United States
- Location: Roughly bounded by Fourth Ave., Kingston St., Third Ave. and Laurel St., Conway, South Carolina
- Coordinates: 33°50′10″N 79°2′51″W
- Area: 5.15 acres (2.08 ha)
- Architectural style: Late 19th And Early 20th Century American Movements
- MPS: Conway MRA
- NRHP reference No.: 94000815 (original); 10000140 (increase 1); 100011793 (increase 2)

Significant dates
- Added to NRHP: August 19, 1994
- Boundary increases: March 31, 2010; May 5, 2025

Conway Downtown Historic District is a national historic district located at Conway in Horry County, South Carolina. It encompasses the historic commercial and governmental core of the city and includes 32 contributing buildings and one contributing structure. They collectively document the growth and development of Conway from about 1824 to about 1950. The majority of the contributing properties were constructed between about 1900 to about 1940. Located within the district is the Old Horry County Courthouse and the town clock. The Art Deco style Holliday Theater was built about 1940.

It was listed on the National Register of Historic Places in 1994 and expanded in 2010 and 2025.
