= Fudges, South Carolina =

- Ghost town
- Location within South Carolina
- Coordinates: 34°43′25″N 80°54′16″W
- Country: United States
- State: South Carolina
- County: Chester
- Elevation: 558 ft (170 m)
- GNIS feature ID: 1232548

Fudges (also Fudges Store) is a ghost town in Chester County, South Carolina, United States.
