= HYW =

HYW may refer to:

- Conway–Horry County Airport, in South Carolina, United States
- Hinchley Wood railway station, in England
- Hundred Years' War
- Western Armenian, a form of modern Armenian language (ISO 639-3 code: "HYW")
