= John Lee (South Carolina politician) =

South Carolina reconstruction era American politician

South Carolina State Senate
- In office 1872–1874

Personal details
- Born: c. 1837 Columbia, South Carolina
- Died: 1881 (aged 43–44)
- Party: Republican

John Lee (c. 1837 - 1881) was a state legislator who served in the South Carolina State Senate during the Reconstruction era from 1872 until 1874.

== Biography ==
Lee was born in Columbia, South Carolina in 1837 and was self educated.

He represented Chester County, South Carolina in the South Carolina State Senate from 1872 until 1874, as a Republican.

Lee also held several other positions during the Reconstruction era including in 1870 a magistrate and trial justice, in 1871 county auditor, postmaster, census marshal, commissioner of elections in 1876.

He served as a captain in the state militia from 1870 until 1873 and then as colonel of the Fourteenth Regiment of the National Guard from 1873 until 1876.

Lee also was a founder of two companies the Champion Hook and Ladder Company in 1871 and the Newberry and Chester Railroad Company.

In 1876 Lee was arrested, but not charged, for the misappropriation of militia money.

He died in Chester, South Carolina sometime shortly before March 10, 1881 when his "recent" death was reported.

== See also ==
- African American officeholders from the end of the Civil War until before 1900
