= Samuel Coleman =

American politician

Samuel Coleman was a state legislator in South Carolina. He represented Chester County, South Carolina in the South Carolina House of Representatives in 1875 and 1876. He eventually moved to North Carolina.

Coleman was elected in 1875 to fill the seat left open after the death of John McCullough, he was elected unopposed as the Conservatives made no nominations.
