= Kimbel Library =

Coordinates: 33°47′41″N 79°0′37″W

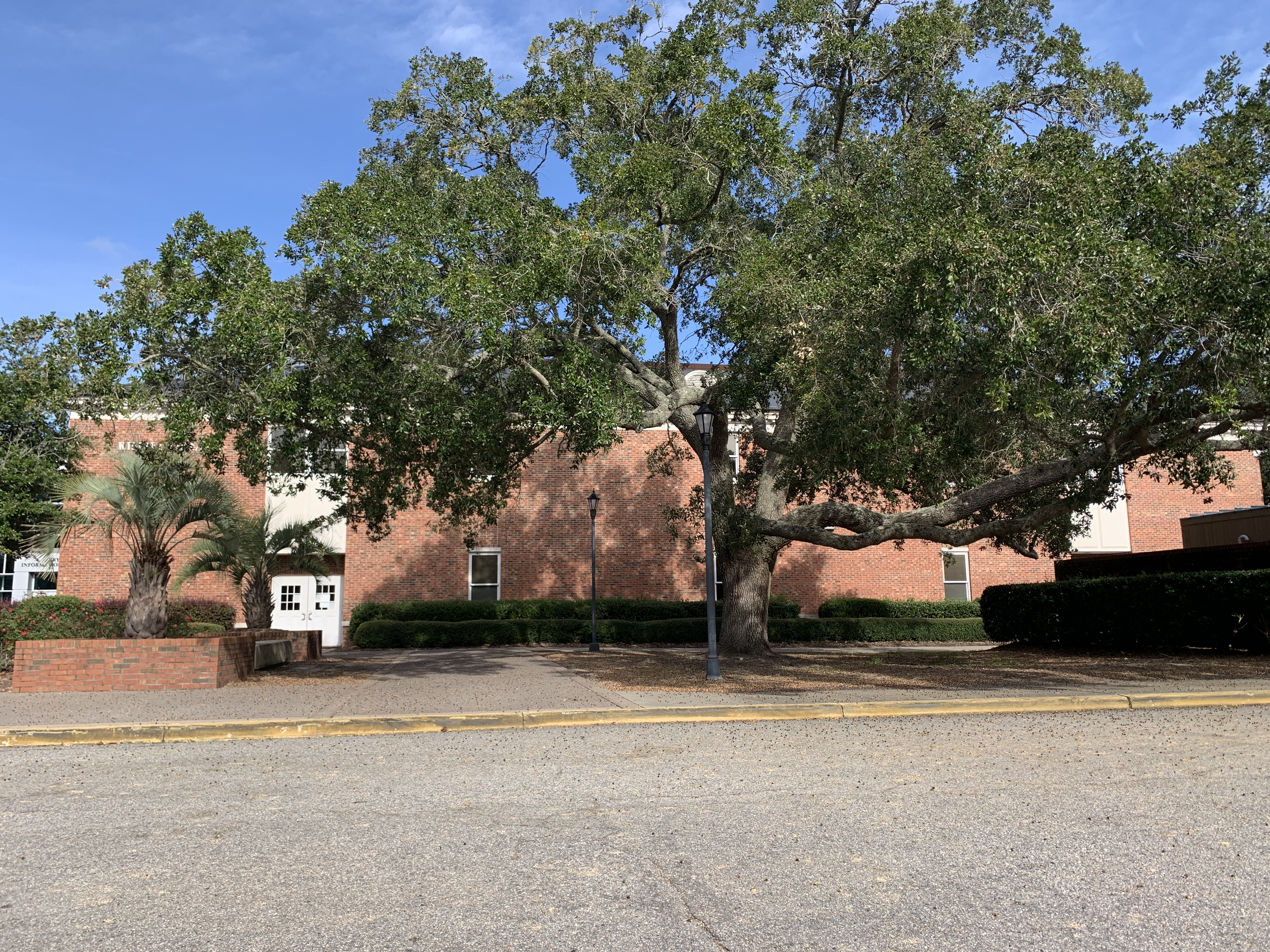
Kimbel Library, exterior view

Kimbel Library, located in Conway, South Carolina, is the academic library at Coastal Carolina University. It is named after William and Maud Kimbel.

== History ==
When Coastal Carolina Junior College was established as a branch of the College of Charleston, arrangements were made for the Horry County Memorial Library to house reserves, and the junior college supplemented the public library and Conway High School library budgets. Catherine Lewis became the first Librarian at Coastal Carolina after a classroom was converted into a library.

After Coastal became a branch of the University of South Carolina in 1961, it moved from its location at Conway High School and into its current location, sitting on 184 acres. Then, only the Singleton building existed, which housed classrooms, offices, and the library. A full-time librarian could no longer be afforded, so Patricia Kleinhans was hired as a library assistant. After the 1967 SACS visit described the library as minimal, the college decided to allot $180,000 to expand the building and allow for the expansion of the library to 27,000 volumes.

In 1975 Coastal became a 4-year institution. The architectural firm of James, Durant, James and Matthews designed the new Kimbel Library. The Dargan Company was hired to build the 2 million dollar project during the summer of 1976. The ribbon-cutting ceremony of Kimbel Library was held on November 15, 1977.

Two-thirds of the library's second floor was devoted to 8 classrooms and 25 faculty offices that would later be available for library expansion. The original shelf space was for 120,000 volumes that would increase to 200,000 when the entire 2nd floor was utilized; although in 1977 the library only had about 55,000 books. On July 1, 1993, Coastal Carolina University became independent from the University of South Carolina. When the Edwards Building of Humanities and Fine Arts was built, it provided office space and classrooms for those that had been taking up space on the second floor of Kimbel Library. In 2002, the entire second floor of the library was renovated, and individual and group study rooms were provided, as well as more shelving for the 250,000 volumes Kimbel Library now has.^{[1]}

== Resources ==
Kimbel Library offers 250,000 volumes spread over two floors. The library uses the Library of Congress Classification system. Additionally, the Library employs about 45 student assistants and 20 full-time librarians and professional staff members to serve patrons.

=== Collections ===
The Horry County Oral History Project began around 1989 as a college-community project to record local history in Horry County. Individuals in the county who have helped to make or who have witnessed the history of Horry County were interviewed through the project. Individuals interviewed include a broad spectrum of the community, ranging from small farmers to community leaders. The Interviews were conducted under the direction of Randall Wells, Director of the Horry County Oral History Project. Presently, there are almost 90 interviews taped, transcribed, corrected and legally released in the Horry County Oral History Project. Though a few transcriptions are of interviews recorded prior to 1989, over 70 interviews have been recorded by this Project since 1989. The original recordings and transcripts are housed in the Waccamaw Center for Cultural and Historical Studies. Additionally, copies of both the recordings and transcriptions are available in the Waccamaw Room, Kimbel Library's special collection dedicated to Horry County and the surrounding Waccamaw region.

The Resource Center of the Jackson Family Center for Ethics & Values is located in the Edwards Humanities and Fine Arts Building Room 272. The Center was established in 2004 in honour of Mary Emily and Nelson Jackson of Myrtle Beach. The Center serves as a leader in cultivating and promoting an awareness of the importance and effectiveness of personal and professional integrity.

The Robert J. Jackson Women's Study Collection is housed in Kimbel Library. This collection was established in early 2004 with an initial 135 volumes contributed by Sally Hare, director of Coastal's Center for Education and Community. The books include biographies, autobiographies and nonfiction work by women. A selection committee will choose additional books to add to the ongoing collection.

The Waccamaw Room is also housed in Kimbel Library. The creation of this special collection began in 1980 with the Waccamaw Regional Studies Program, later called the Waccamaw Regional Studies Center, and now known as the Waccamaw Center for Southern History and Culture. The mission of the Center is to research and disseminate studies in Southern history and culture, with a special emphasis on studies of the Waccamaw Region of South Carolina. Currently, the room also stores selected materials that are potential archival sources relating to the history of the Coastal Carolina University.
