= Duley Trucc =

American singer-songwriter

- Born: Tevin Speights; November 21, 1991 (age 34); Conway, South Carolina, United States
- Origin: Conway, South Carolina, United States
- Genres: Hip-hop, R&B, various
- Occupations: Musical artist and songwriter

Duley Trucc (born Tevin Speights on November 21, 1991 in Conway, South Carolina, United States) is an American musical artist and songwriter.

He has also performed at House of Blues in Myrtle Beach, South Carolina as a supporting act for Young Dolph before about 1,500 people.

== Early life and education ==
He entered Aynor High School and completed his high school education.

== Career ==
Duley Trucc is a singer and a songwriter. He debuted in the music industry with his 14-track album, Mechanic under his stage name.

Duley Trucc's tracks, including "Above the Rim", "Trap Well", "Wait" and "Splash" were all radio hits. Some of his tracks feature themes about the COVID-19 pandemic.

Duley Trucc released the music video "Me or You [BLM]", featuring Boosie Badazz x O'shea in 2021. The video's themes are police brutality in the United States and the Black Lives Matter movement.

== Selected discography ==
Title	Type	Date
Foreign Lifestyle	Mixtape	December 2015
Mechanic	Album	26 March 2021
"Splash"	Single	

- First Mixtape Foreign Lifestyle, released December 17, 2015
  - Intro (Duley Trucc)
  - Foreign ft. Zilla (Duley Trucc)
  - Swag ft. Versa Mane (Duley Trucc)
  - Annoying ft. Tezzy (Duley Trucc)
  - From the Block ft. Zilla and Danero (Duley Trucc)
  - Real Life Shit ft. Versa Mane (Duley Trucc)
  - Fancy ft. Zilla (Duley Trucc)
  - Trapwell ft. Remidi (Duley Trucc)
  - Moe Gunna Skit (Duley Trucc)
  - Ridiculous (Duley Trucc)
  - Above the Rim (Duley Trucc)
  - Gorgeous (Duley Trucc)
  - She Good (Duley Trucc)

== Controversy ==
Trucc was arrested for drug possession in Conway, South Carolina in 2015, although the charges were later dropped.
