= 2008 United States presidential election in South Carolina =

- November 4, 2008

| Nominee | John McCain | Barack Obama |
| Party | Republican | Democratic |
| Home state | Arizona | Illinois |
| Running mate | Sarah Palin | Joe Biden |
| Electoral vote | 8 | 0 |
| Popular vote | 1,034,896 | 862,449 |
| Percentage | 53.87% | 44.90% |

McCain
40–50%
50–60%
60–70%
70–80%
80–90%
90–100%
Obama
40–50%
50–60%
60–70%
70–80%
80–90%
90–100%
President before election
George W. Bush
Republican
Elected President
Barack Obama
Democratic

The 2008 United States presidential election in South Carolina took place on November 4, 2008, and was part of the 2008 United States presidential election. Voters chose eight representatives, or electors to the Electoral College, who voted for president and vice president.

South Carolina was won by Republican nominee John McCain by an 8.97% margin. Prior to the election, all 17 news organizations considered this a state McCain would win, or otherwise a red state. Despite the significant proportion of African Americans in the state, South Carolina still remains, like most other states throughout the South, a GOP stronghold at the state and federal levels. McCain kept South Carolina in the GOP column in 2008, clinching 53.87% of the vote. This is the first time a presidential candidate received more than 1,000,000 votes in the state. However, McCain's 9% margin was significantly less than Bush's 17% margin in 2004.

== Primaries ==
For both parties in 2008, South Carolina's was the first primary in a Southern state and the first primary in a state in which African Americans make up a sizable percentage of the electorate. For Democrats, it was also the last primary before 22 states hosted their primaries or caucuses on February 5, 2008 (Super Tuesday).

=== Democratic primary ===
South Carolina Democratic primary, 2008
- January 26, 2008
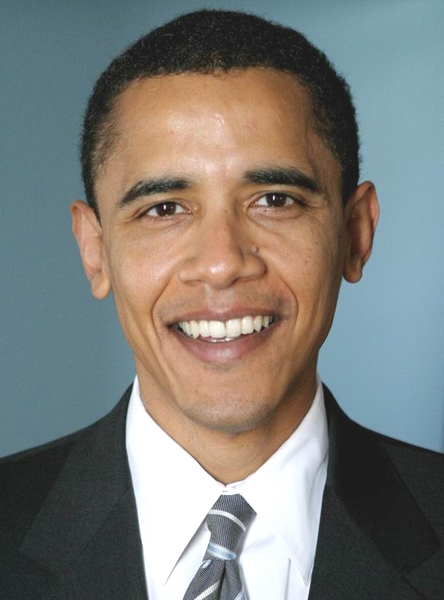

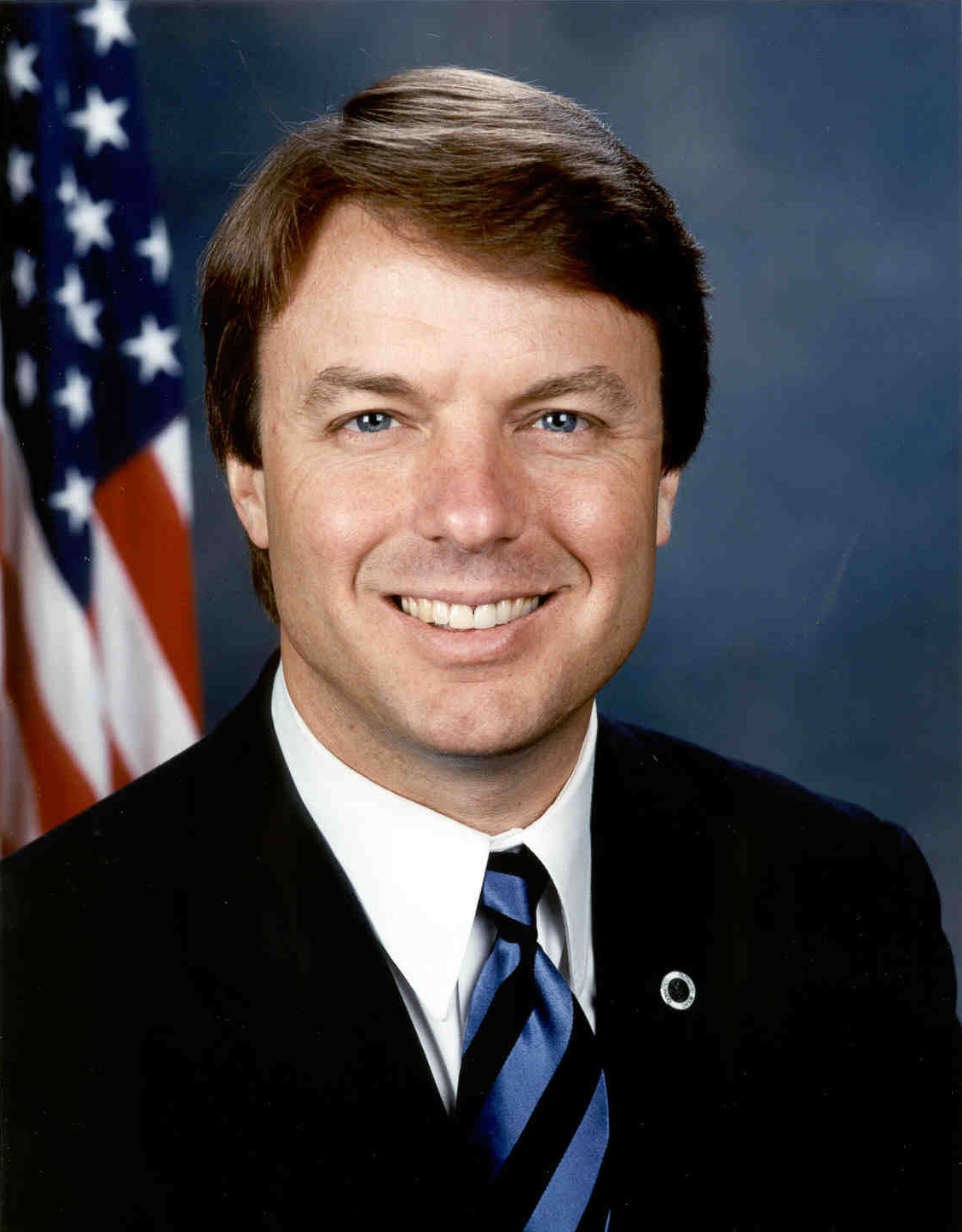
| Nominee | Barack Obama | Hillary Clinton | John Edwards |
| Home state | Illinois | New York | North Carolina |
| Popular vote | 295,214 | 141,217 | 93,576 |
| Percentage | 55.4% | 26.5% | 17.6% |
- Election results by county. Purple denotes counties won by Obama, gold denotes those won by Clinton, and orange denotes those won by Edwards.

The 2008 South Carolina Democratic presidential primary took place on January 26, 2008. Senator Barack Obama of Illinois won the primary's popular vote by a 28.9% margin.

South Carolina's 45 delegates to the 2008 Democratic National Convention were awarded proportionally based on the results of the primary. The state also sent nine superdelegates.

==== Candidates ====
===== Remaining =====
- New York Senator Hillary Clinton
- Former North Carolina Senator John Edwards
- Former Alaska Senator Mike Gravel
- Illinois Senator Barack Obama

===== Eliminated =====
- Delaware Senator Joe Biden Dropped out on January 4, 2008
- Connecticut Senator Chris Dodd Dropped out on January 4, 2008
- New Mexico Governor Bill Richardson Dropped out on January 10, 2008
- Ohio Representative Dennis Kucinich Dropped out on January 25, 2008
- New York Comedian Stephen Colbert Denied Ballot (13-3) on November 1, 2007 and dropped out November 5, 2007

==== Campaign Finances ====
On the day of the South Carolina primary, Senator John Edwards led in fund raising from the state of South Carolina, followed by Barack Obama and Bill Richardson.

Obtained from CNN as of January 26, 2008

| Candidate | Money raised (US$) |
|---|---|
| John Edwards | $316,319 |
| Barack Obama | $257,118 |
| Bill Richardson | $196,850 |
| Hillary Clinton | $131,950 |
| Joe Biden | $55,350 |
| Chris Dodd | $22,750 |
| Dennis Kucinich | $3,750 |

==== Polling leading up to primary ====
All monthly averages were retrieved from RealClearPolitics.

| Candidate | November | December | January | Final 3 Polls Averages |
|---|---|---|---|---|
| Hillary Clinton | 40% | 34% | 27% | 28% |
| Barack Obama | 27% | 33% | 41% | 48% |
| John Edwards | 11% | 15% | 17% | 23% |

Denotes Leader during Poll Average

Despite maintaining a major early lead in the polls, Senator Clinton rapidly fell after the Iowa Caucuses, as Barack Obama skyrocketed and John Edwards began to receive a gradual increase in the polling.

However, in the last three polls taken before the South Carolina Primary, Barack Obama took a commanding lead over both Edwards and Clinton. Also, Former Senator John Edwards had come into the margin of error with Senator Clinton for second place in the South Carolina Primary.

==== Final Campaigning ====
===== Obama Campaign =====
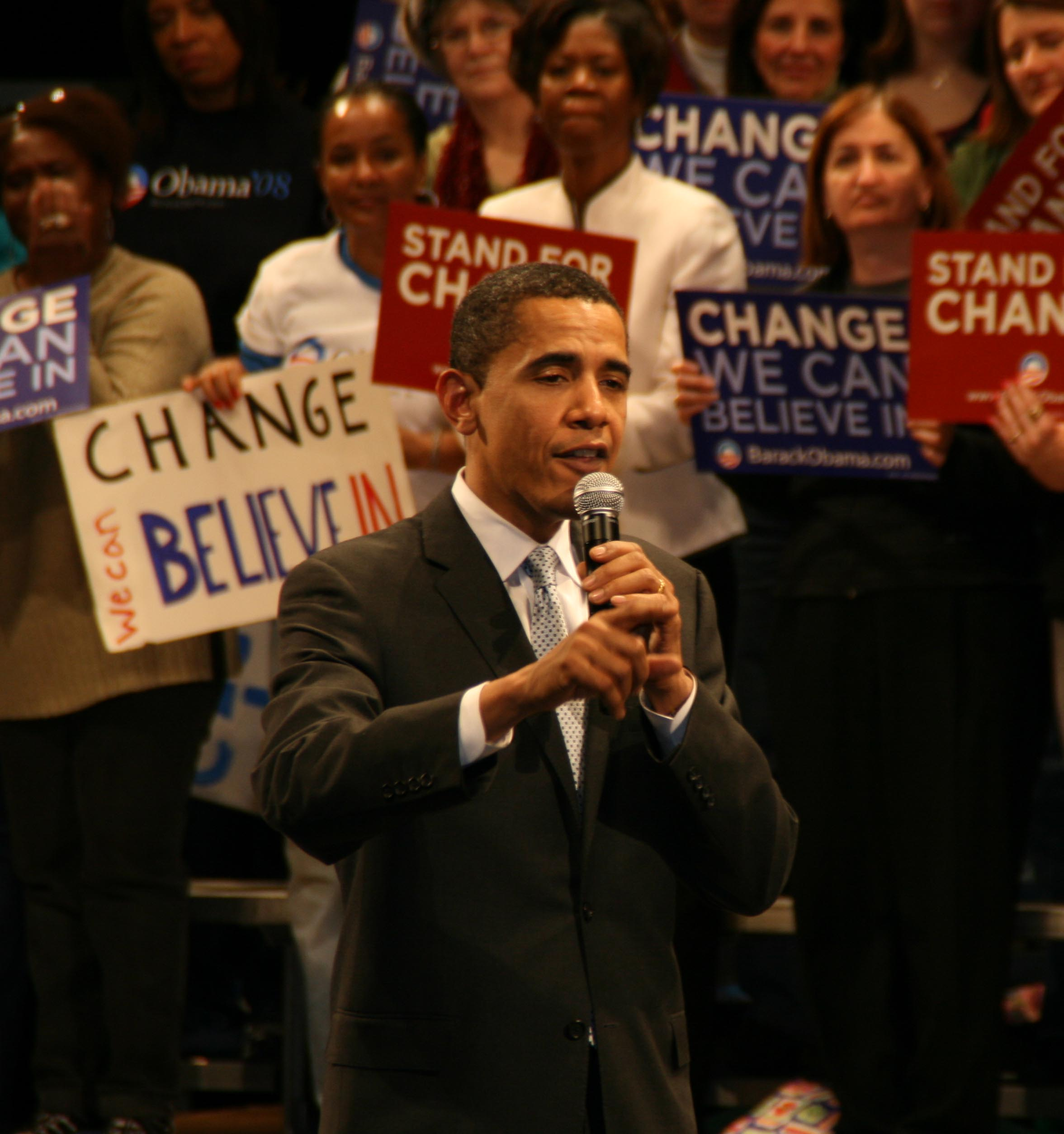
Presidential candidate Barack Obama addresses supporters the night before South Carolina's primary

Throughout the South Carolina campaign, most pundits had predicted Barack Obama the winner, primarily because of the state's large African-American population. For this reason, Obama was shown to be significantly ahead of his two rivals, John Edwards, who carried the state in 2004, and Hillary Clinton, whose husband was popular in the African-American community. In early polls taken in the weeks leading up to the primary, Clinton had a double-digit lead over both Edwards and Obama (see poll averages above).

During a majority of the final campaigning, the attacks between the Clinton campaign and the Obama campaign highly intensified by the candidates as well as the media coverage. Barack Obama began to attack former President Bill Clinton for his comments which were taken as racist. These comments are considered by analyst and historians alike as the turning point of the South Carolina primary and ultimately the cause of Clinton's loss of support from the black community.

Despite the increasing tensions between the Clinton and Obama camps, Obama continued to widely lead in the polls (despite a surge by Edwards). Into the final days of the campaign in South Carolina, it became apparent that Obama would win by a rather wide margin. The final tally had Obama winning by 28.9% over his closest rival, Hillary Clinton.

===== Clinton Campaign =====
In the early months of the campaign, Clinton enjoyed a steep lead over Senator Obama, and a 30-point lead over former Senator John Edwards. However, after Obama's win in Iowa, Clinton's campaign in South Carolina began to fall apart by the Obama political machine rolling into South Carolina with force.

For Clinton, despite winning the popular vote in Nevada, the fact that she had lost Nevada's National Delegates, receiving 12 compared to Obama's 13 still lingered in the media. This, combined with the fact of Bill Clinton's continuing negative publicity from "injecting race into the campaign" as several people called Bill Clinton's actions in his wife's campaign.

Between battling media scrutiny on Bill Clinton, constant attacks between the Obama and Clinton campaigns, and a surging John Edwards which threatened a Clinton second-place finish, poll number began to plunge, with a poll taken by Reuters-Cspan-Zogby showing Clinton in the margin of error for second place with Edwards, with Edwards at 21% and Clinton at 25%. This was also combined with the fact of Edwards's constant barrage of attacks claiming Clinton (and Obama's) big city politics were "too good for the people of South Carolina".

However, despite the attacks from opponents that Bill Clinton's attacks largely alienated African-Americans, Clinton was able to keep a 35% support amongst that key constituency, while losing the white vote to Edwards, In the end, Clinton's African-American support was able to place her in a clear second-place finish, finishing 9 points ahead of John Edwards despite losing to Obama by 29 points.

===== Edwards Campaign =====
After the terrible results for the Edwards Campaign during the Nevada caucuses, in which Edwards finished in third with 4% of the state delegation and received no national delegates, South Carolina began to look as a state where he needed a strong finish, after finishing in third in the last 3 primaries which took place, and trailing in the number of total national delegates.

South Carolina was the state in which Edwards was born and raised. In 2004, Edwards won the South Carolina Primary, with 45% of the vote to John Kerry's 30% and Al Sharpton's 10%. While entering South Carolina, it became apparent that he needed a first-place finish, which seemed impossible, or a second-place finish, which seemed more within grasp.

Before the CNN South Carolina Debate in Myrtle Beach on Monday, January 21, 2008, John Edwards was placing a distant third in a poll taken before the debates on January 19, in which he placed third with 15% compared to Hillary Clinton's second place with 27%. However, after the South Carolina debates, the tone of the campaign severely shifted.

During the South Carolina Democratic Debate in Myrtle Beach, Edwards sought to distinguish himself from Senators Obama and Clinton, and criticized them for their attacks and "big city" politics. As soon as he began to question how the attacks helped, he was widely cheered by the audience for in what many people thought was what distinguished Edwards from negative campaigning. Saying "This kind of squabbling, how many children are going to get healthcare? How many people are going to get an education from this? How many kids are going to be able to go to college because of this? We have got to understand and I respect both of my fellow candidates, but we have got to understand that this is not about us personally, it is about what we are trying to do for this country and what we believe in", Edwards began to get applause from several members of the audience.

After the debate, John Edwards began to see a major influx of money and in turn, poll numbers began to rise rapidly in Edwards's favor. Along with the debate performance, Bill Clinton's remarks began to alienate black supporters from Clinton, and white supporters from Obama. As a result, Edwards won amongst white voters ages 30 to 50, while receiving the same amount of support from white 60+ year olds as Hillary Clinton according to CNN Exit Polls

However, Edwards was not able to get much support from non-whites, and according to Exit Polls, received only 2% of the non-white support, while receiving 40% of the white support.

==== Results ====
Barack Obama won the primary, taking 44 of the 46 counties; Edwards won in his native Oconee County, while Clinton won in Horry County, which contains Myrtle Beach.

| Key: | Withdrew prior to contest |

South Carolina Democratic presidential primary, 2008
| Candidate | Results | | | Estimated national delegates |
| Candidate | Votes | Percentage | National delegates | Estimated national delegates |
|---|---|---|---|---|
| Barack Obama | 295,214 | 55.44% | 25 | 33 |
| Hillary Clinton | 141,217 | 26.52% | 12 | 12 |
| John Edwards | 93,576 | 17.57% | 8 | 0 |
| Bill Richardson | 727 | 0.14% | 0 | 0 |
| Joe Biden | 694 | 0.13% | 0 | 0 |
| Dennis Kucinich | 552 | 0.1% | 0 | 0 |
| Christopher Dodd | 247 | 0.05% | 0 | 0 |
| Mike Gravel | 241 | 0.05% | 0 | 0 |
| Totals | 532,468 | 100.00% | 45 | 45 |

=== Republican primary ===
South Carolina Republican primary, 2008
- January 19, 2008
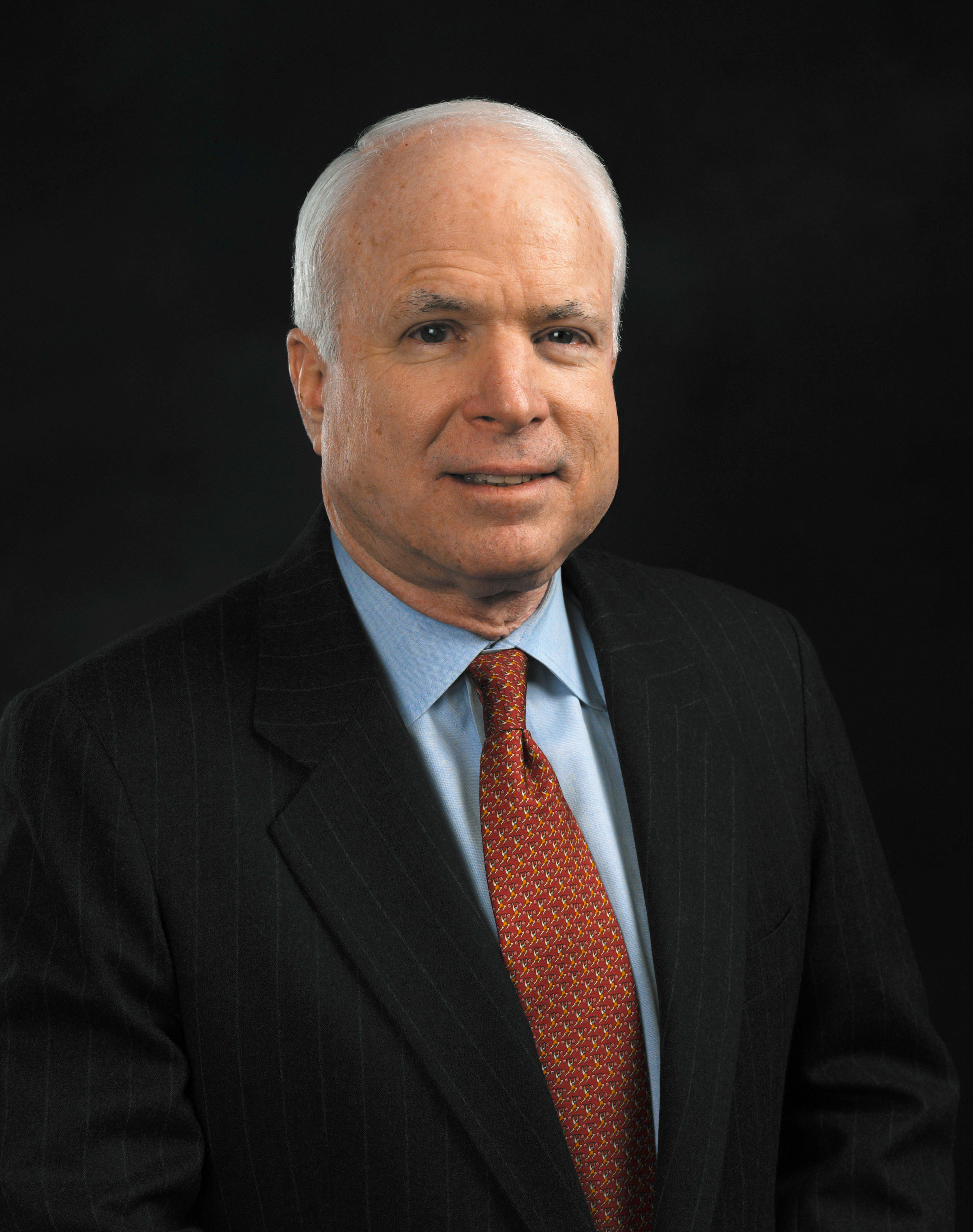

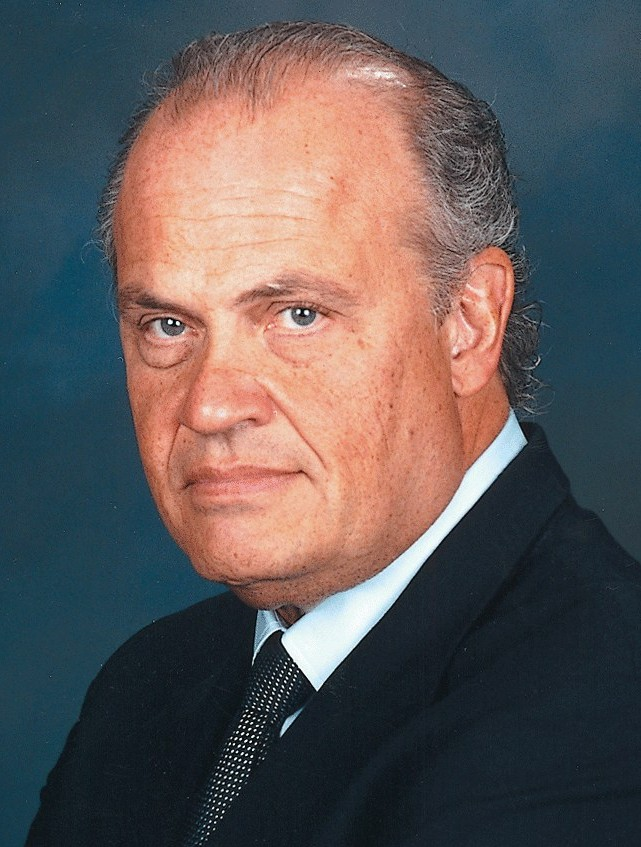
| Nominee | John McCain | Mike Huckabee | Fred Thompson |
| Party | Republican | Republican | Republican |
| Home state | Arizona | Arkansas | Tennessee |
| Popular vote | 147,733 | 132,990 | 69,681 |
| Percentage | 33.15% | 29.84% | 15.63% |
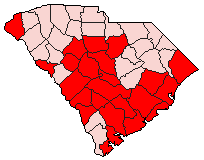
- Election results by county. Red denotes counties won by McCain, and Pink denotes those won by Huckabee.

The South Carolina Republican primary, 2008 was held on January 19, with 24 delegates at stake. The Republican National Committee took half of South Carolina's 47 delegates away from them because the state committee moved its Republican primary before February 5. It was held on the same day as the Nevada Republican caucuses, 2008.

The primary has become one of several key early state nominating contests in the process of choosing the nominee of the Republican party for the November 2008 election for President of the United States. It has historically been more important for the Republican Party than for the Democratic Party; from its inception in 1980 through the election of 2000, the winner of the Republican presidential primary has gone on to win the nomination. As of 2008, the primary has cemented its place as the "First in the South" primary for both parties.

This states 24 delegates would be awarded on a "Winner-Takes-All" basis. 12 Delegates for the Statewide winner and 12 delegates awarded on a District-winner basis awarding 2 delegates for each of the states then 6 Congressional districts.

==== Polling ====
As of January 19, RealClearPolitics reported that the average support from polls placed McCain in the lead with 26.9%, followed by Huckabee with 25.9%, Romney with 14.7%, Thompson with 14.6%, Paul with 4.4%, and Giuliani with 3.4%.

==== Results ====
Huckabee was for weeks leading in the state but lost by a 14,743 vote margin. He did manage to win Congressional districts 3, 4 and 5 in the North of the state earning him a total of 6 delegates.

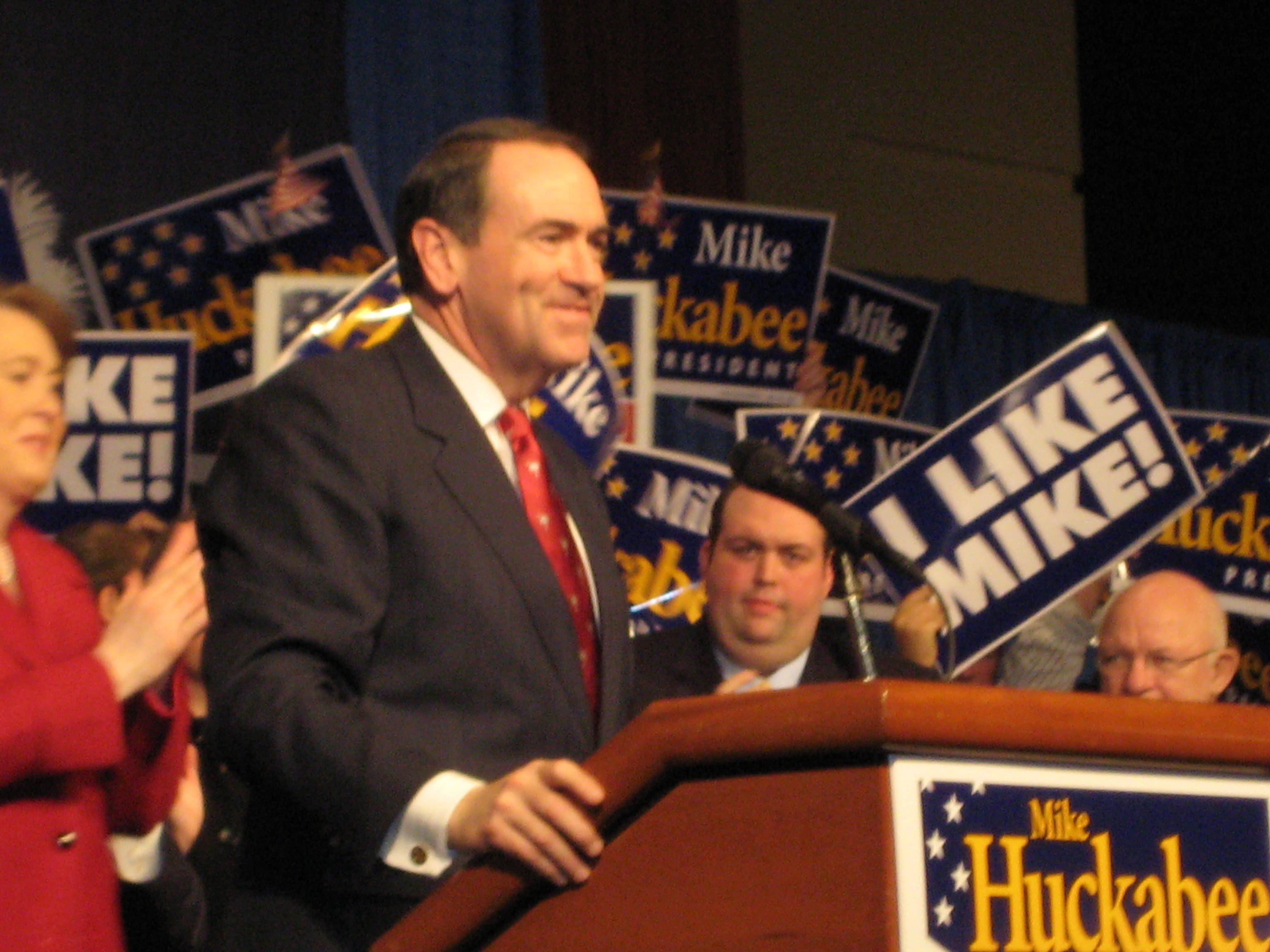
Mike Huckabee giving his concession speech after the 2008 South Carolina Presidential Primary in Columbia, SC.

John McCain won the statewide primary earning him 12 Delegates as well as Congressional Districts 1, 2 and 6. earning him an additional 6 delegates for a total of 18.

100% of precincts reporting
| Candidate | Votes | Percentage | Delegates |
|---|---|---|---|
| John McCain | 147,733 | 33.15% | 18 |
| Mike Huckabee | 132,990 | 29.84% | 6 |
| Fred Thompson | 69,681 | 15.63% | 0 |
| Mitt Romney | 68,177 | 15.3% | 0 |
| Ron Paul | 16,155 | 3.62% | 0 |
| Rudy Giuliani | 9,575 | 2.15% | 0 |
| Duncan Hunter* | 1,051 | 0.24% | 0 |
| Tom Tancredo* | 121 | 0.03% | 0 |
| Hugh Cort | 88 | 0.02% | 0 |
| John H. Cox | 83 | 0.02% | 0 |
| Cap Fendig | 23 | 0.01% | 0 |
| Total | 445,677 | 100% | 24 |

* Candidate withdrew his bid for the nomination prior to the reporting of the primary. On January 22, 2008, after a poor showing Fred Thompson dropped out of the race. Duncan Hunter did so too.

==== Results of prior primaries ====
- 1980: Ronald Reagan won with 54%, defeating runner-up John Connally.
- 1984: Uncontested (Reagan was the incumbent president and was re-nominated).
- 1988: George H. W. Bush won with 49%, defeating runner-up Bob Dole.
- 1992: George H. W. Bush won with 68%, defeating runner-up Pat Buchanan.
- 1996: Bob Dole won with 45%, defeating runner-up Pat Buchanan.
- 2000: George W. Bush won with 53%, defeating runner-up John McCain.
- 2004: Uncontested (Bush was the incumbent president and was re-nominated).

== Campaign ==
=== Predictions ===
There were 16 news organizations who made state-by-state predictions of the election. Here are their last predictions before election day:

| Source | Ranking |
|---|---|
| D.C. Political Report | Likely R |
| Cook Political Report | Solid R |
| The Takeaway | Solid R |
| Electoral-vote.com | Solid R |
| Washington Post | Solid R |
| Politico | Solid R |
| RealClearPolitics | Solid R |
| FiveThirtyEight | Solid R |
| CQ Politics | Solid R |
| The New York Times | Solid R |
| CNN | Safe R |
| NPR | Solid R |
| MSNBC | Solid R |
| Fox News | Likely R |
| Associated Press | Likely R |
| Rasmussen Reports | Safe R |

=== Polling ===
McCain won every single pre-election poll. The final 3 polls averaged McCain leading with 53% to 43%.

=== Fundraising ===
John McCain raised a total of $2,574,332 in the state. Barack Obama raised $2,227,877.

=== Advertising and visits ===
Obama spent $967,640. McCain and his interest groups spent $587,645. Neither campaign visited the state.

== Analysis ==
South Carolina, historically part of the Solid South, has become a Republican stronghold. Since Barry Goldwater carried the state in 1964, the only Democratic presidential nominee to win it was Jimmy Carter of neighboring Georgia in 1976. Since then, South Carolina has reliably voted Republican. This trend continued in 2008, even though South Carolina has one of the highest African-American populations in the country. Neither Obama nor McCain seriously contested the state, as it was viewed by both campaigns as a safe GOP/McCain/red state.

On Election Day, McCain captured South Carolina with 53.87% of the vote. McCain dominated the populous northwest, while Obama did best in the cities of Columbia and Charleston, as well as the rural, heavily African American areas. In comparison to the past two elections where the margin was much larger, Obama's relative closeness can be attributed to the large turnout of African American voters in the state who cast their votes 96% for Obama. McCain's margin of victory in South Carolina was much less than that of George W. Bush who carried South Carolina in 2004 with 57.98% of the vote to John Kerry's 40.90%, a 17.08% margin of victory compared to McCain's 8.97% in 2008, resulting in an 8.11% swing to the Democrats in 2008.

During the same election, incumbent Republican U.S. Senator Lindsey Graham was reelected over Democrat Bob Conley. Graham received 57.52% of the vote while Conley took in 42.25%. At the state level, however, Democrats picked up two seats in the South Carolina House of Representatives. As of 2024, this is the last election in which the margin of victory in South Carolina was within single digits.

== Results ==
United States presidential election in South Carolina, 2008
| Party | Candidate | Running mate | Votes | Percentage | Electoral votes |
|---|---|---|---|---|---|
| Republican | John McCain | Sarah Palin | 1,034,896 | 53.87% | 8 |
| Democratic | Barack Obama | Joe Biden | 862,449 | 44.90% | 0 |
| Libertarian | Bob Barr | Wayne Allyn Root | 7,283 | 0.38% | 0 |
| Constitution | Chuck Baldwin | Darrell Castle | 6,287 | 0.36% | 0 |
| Petition | Ralph Nader | Matt Gonzalez | 5,053 | 0.26% | 0 |
| Green | Cynthia McKinney | Rosa Clemente | 4,461 | 0.23% | 0 |
| Totals | | | 1,920,969 | 100.00% | 8 |
| Voter turnout (Voting age population) | | | | | 58.0% |

=== By county ===
| County | John McCain Republican | | Barack Obama Democratic | | Various candidates Other parties | | Margin | | Total |
| County | # | % | # | % | # | % | # | % | Total |
|---|---|---|---|---|---|---|---|---|---|
| Abbeville | 6,264 | 56.94% | 4,593 | 41.75% | 144 | 1.31% | 1,671 | 15.19% | 11,001 |
| Aiken | 42,849 | 61.41% | 26,101 | 37.41% | 820 | 1.18% | 16,748 | 24.00% | 69,770 |
| Allendale | 947 | 23.53% | 3,029 | 75.27% | 48 | 1.20% | -2,082 | -51.74% | 4,024 |
| Anderson | 48,690 | 65.99% | 24,132 | 32.70% | 965 | 1.31% | 24,558 | 33.29% | 73,787 |
| Bamberg | 2,309 | 33.89% | 4,426 | 64.95% | 79 | 1.16% | -2,117 | -31.06% | 6,814 |
| Barnwell | 4,769 | 48.67% | 4,931 | 50.33% | 98 | 1.00% | -162 | -1.66% | 9,798 |
| Beaufort | 37,821 | 54.92% | 30,396 | 44.14% | 653 | 0.94% | 7,425 | 10.78% | 68,870 |
| Berkeley | 36,205 | 55.89% | 27,755 | 42.84% | 144 | 1.27% | 8,450 | 13.05% | 64,781 |
| Calhoun | 3,695 | 47.75% | 3,970 | 51.31% | 73 | 0.94% | -275 | -3.56% | 7,738 |
| Charleston | 69,822 | 45.21% | 82,698 | 53.55% | 1,914 | 1.24% | -12,876 | -8.34% | 154,434 |
| Cherokee | 13,305 | 64.07% | 7,215 | 34.74% | 246 | 1.19% | 6,090 | 29.33% | 20,766 |
| Chester | 6,318 | 45.19% | 7,478 | 53.49% | 185 | 1.32% | -1,160 | -8.30% | 13,981 |
| Chesterfield | 8,325 | 50.89% | 7,842 | 47.94% | 192 | 1.17% | 483 | 2.95% | 16,359 |
| Clarendon | 6,758 | 43.45% | 8,673 | 55.77% | 121 | 0.78% | -1,915 | -12.32% | 15,552 |
| Colleton | 8,525 | 49.22% | 8,616 | 49.74% | 180 | 1.04% | -91 | -0.52% | 17,321 |
| Darlington | 14,544 | 49.58% | 14,505 | 49.45% | 285 | 0.97% | 39 | 0.13% | 29,334 |
| Dillon | 5,874 | 43.78% | 7,408 | 55.21% | 135 | 1.01% | -1,534 | -11.43% | 13,417 |
| Dorchester | 29,929 | 57.11% | 21,806 | 41.61% | 670 | 1.28% | 8,123 | 15.50% | 52,405 |
| Edgefield | 6,334 | 54.98% | 5,075 | 44.05% | 111 | 0.97% | 1,259 | 10.93% | 11,520 |
| Fairfield | 3,912 | 33.67% | 7,591 | 65.33% | 116 | 1.00% | -3,679 | -31.66% | 11,619 |
| Florence | 29,861 | 51.16% | 28,012 | 47.99% | 500 | 0.85% | 1,849 | 3.17% | 58,373 |
| Georgetown | 15,790 | 52.13% | 14,199 | 46.88% | 301 | 0.99% | 1,591 | 5.25% | 30,290 |
| Greenville | 116,363 | 61.03% | 70,886 | 37.18% | 3,408 | 1.79% | 45,477 | 23.85% | 190,657 |
| Greenwood | 16,995 | 57.29% | 12,348 | 41.62% | 324 | 1.09% | 4,647 | 15.67% | 29,667 |
| Hampton | 3,439 | 36.78% | 5,816 | 62.20% | 95 | 1.02% | -2,377 | -25.42% | 9,350 |
| Horry | 64,609 | 61.65% | 38,879 | 37.10% | 1,310 | 1.25% | 25,730 | 24.55% | 104,798 |
| Jasper | 3,365 | 38.01% | 5,389 | 60.87% | 100 | 1.12% | -2,024 | -22.86% | 8,854 |
| Kershaw | 16,466 | 58.84% | 11,226 | 40.11% | 293 | 1.05% | 5,240 | 18.73% | 27,985 |
| Lancaster | 16,441 | 56.85% | 12,139 | 41.97% | 341 | 1.18% | 4,302 | 14.88% | 28,921 |
| Laurens | 15,334 | 58.34% | 10,578 | 40.25% | 370 | 1.41% | 4,756 | 18.09% | 26,282 |
| Lee | 3,074 | 33.58% | 5,960 | 65.12% | 119 | 1.30% | -2,886 | -31.54% | 9,153 |
| Lexington | 74,960 | 68.45% | 33,303 | 30.41% | 1,249 | 1.14% | 41,657 | 38.04% | 109,512 |
| Marion | 5,416 | 35.69% | 9,608 | 63.32% | 150 | 0.99% | -4,192 | -27.63% | 15,174 |
| Marlboro | 3,996 | 36.74% | 6,794 | 62.47% | 86 | 0.79% | -2,798 | -25.73% | 10,876 |
| McCormick | 2,437 | 46.58% | 2,755 | 52.66% | 40 | 0.76% | -318 | -6.08% | 5,232 |
| Newberry | 9,616 | 58.19% | 6,708 | 40.60% | 200 | 1.21% | 2,908 | 17.59% | 16,524 |
| Oconee | 21,164 | 67.98% | 9,481 | 30.45% | 487 | 1.57% | 11,683 | 37.53% | 31,132 |
| Orangeburg | 12,115 | 30.47% | 27,263 | 68.58% | 376 | 0.95% | -15,148 | -38.11% | 39,754 |
| Pickens | 32,552 | 72.13% | 11,691 | 25.91% | 885 | 1.96% | 20,861 | 46.22% | 45,128 |
| Richland | 57,941 | 35.11% | 105,656 | 64.02% | 1,440 | 0.87% | -47,715 | -28.91% | 165,037 |
| Saluda | 5,191 | 60.34% | 3,323 | 38.63% | 89 | 1.03% | 1,868 | 21.71% | 8,603 |
| Spartanburg | 65,042 | 60.04% | 41,632 | 38.43% | 1,654 | 1.53% | 23,410 | 21.61% | 108,328 |
| Sumter | 18,581 | 41.89% | 25,431 | 57.33% | 346 | 0.78% | -6,850 | -15.44% | 44,358 |
| Union | 7,449 | 54.97% | 5,935 | 43.80% | 167 | 1.23% | 1,514 | 11.17% | 13,551 |
| Williamsburg | 5,004 | 30.43% | 11,279 | 68.59% | 160 | 0.98% | -6,275 | -38.16% | 16,443 |
| York | 54,500 | 58.17% | 37,918 | 40.47% | 1,278 | 1.36% | 16,582 | 17.70% | 93,696 |
| Totals | 1,034,896 | 53.87% | 862,449 | 44.90% | 23,624 | 1.23% | 172,447 | 8.97% | 1,920,969 |

Counties that flipped from Republican to Democratic

- Barnwell (largest town: Barnwell)
- Calhoun (largest town: St. Matthews)
- Charleston (largest town: Charleston)
- Chester (largest town: Chester)
- Colleton (largest town: Walterboro)

=== By congressional district ===
John McCain carried five of the state's six congressional districts, including one held by a Democrat.

| District | McCain | Obama | Representative |
|---|---|---|---|
| 1st | 56.50% | 42.27% | Henry E. Brown Jr. (R) |
| 2nd | 53.87% | 45.11% | Joe Wilson (R) |
| 3rd | 63.72% | 33% | Gresham Barrett (R) |
| 4th | 60.43% | 37.91% | Bob Inglis (R) |
| 5th | 53.04% | 45.80% | John Spratt (D) |
| 6th | 34.89% | 64.15% | Jim Clyburn (D) |

== Electors ==
Technically the voters of South Carolina cast their ballots for electors: representatives to the Electoral College. South Carolina is allocated 8 electors because it has 6 congressional districts and 2 senators. All candidates who appear on the ballot or qualify to receive write-in votes must submit a list of 8 electors, who pledge to vote for their candidate and their running mate. Whoever wins the majority of votes in the state is awarded all 8 electoral votes. Their chosen electors then vote for president and vice president. Although electors are pledged to their candidate and running mate, they are not obligated to vote for them. An elector who votes for someone other than their candidate is known as a faithless elector.

The electors of each state and the District of Columbia met on December 15, 2008, to cast their votes for president and vice president. The Electoral College itself never meets as one body. Instead the electors from each state and the District of Columbia met in their respective capitols.

The following were the members of the Electoral College from the state. All 8 were pledged to John McCain and Sarah Palin:

1. Benny Kinlaw
2. Betty Sheppard Poe
3. Katon Dawson
4. Patrick Bonner Haddon
5. Rebecca Delleney
6. Shelby Phillips
7. Susan Aiken
8. Wayland Moody

== See also ==
- South Carolina primary
