= Grainger Generating Station =

- Official name: Dolphus M. Grainger Generating Station
- Country: United States
- Location: Horry County, South Carolina near Conway, South Carolina
- Coordinates: 33°49′33″N 79°03′10″W
- Status: Decommissioned
- Commission date: Units 1–2: 1966
- Decommission date: Units 1–2: 2012
- Owner: Central Electric Power Cooperative
- Operator: Santee Cooper

Thermal power station
- Primary fuel: Coal
- Cooling source: Lake Busbee

Power generation
- Nameplate capacity: 170 MW

The Dolphus M. Grainger Generating Station was a coal power plant located near Conway in Horry County, South Carolina, United States. The plant closed in 2012. It was owned by Central Electric Power Cooperative and operated by Santee Cooper.

== History ==
Grainger was constructed at a cost of $52 million and unit 1 began generating electricity in 1965 and unit 2 began operation in 1966. The plant is named after Dolphus M. Grainger, a Horry County native who pushed for rural electrification. The power plant had 2 units and had an operating capacity of 170 megawatts (MW). Its cooling source came from the nearby Waccamaw River and outlet to Lake Busbee which was created for the power plant. In 2004, Grainger along with several other coal plants owned by Santee Cooper were found to be in violation of the Clean Air Act. As a part of the settlement, Santee Cooper had to install LO-NOx burners to reduce nitrogen oxide (NO_{x}) emissions at Grainger. Grainger was retired in October 2012 by Santee Cooper as it was too costly to comply with the United States Environmental Protection Agency's (EPA) Mercury and Air Toxics Standard (MATS). After three years of decommissioning, demolition of Grainger's structure began in 2015. Its two smokestacks were imploded using controlled demolition in February 2016. Lake Busbee was drained and returned to its natural state as wetlands in 2018.

== See also ==
- List of power stations in South Carolina
