= Wilksburg, South Carolina =

Unincorporated community in South Carolina

Coordinates: 34°44′42″N 81°23′9″W

Wilksburg is an unincorporated community in western Chester County, South Carolina along Sumter National Forest in the piedmont forest of South Carolina. Wilksburg sits at an elevation of around 591 feet.
