= Bob Mills =

Bob Mills may refer to:

- Bob Mills (businessman) (1947–2026), American businessman, founder of Bob Mills Furniture
- Bob Mills (comedian) (born 1957), British comedian and radio presenter
- Bob Mills (politician) (born 1941), Canadian politician

== See also ==
- Robert Mills (disambiguation)
