= Edgemoor, South Carolina =

- Unincorporated community
- Nickname: Edgey
- Motto: Expanding from the edge to gain more!
- Location within South Carolina Location within the United States
- Coordinates: 34°48′21″N 81°00′41″W
- Country: United States
- State: South Carolina
- County: Chester
- Elevation: 594 ft (181 m)
- Time zone: UTC-5 (Eastern (EST))
  - Summer (DST): UTC-4 (EDT)
- Area codes: 803, 839
- GNIS feature ID: 1247635

Edgemoor is an unincorporated community in northeastern Chester County, South Carolina, United States. Edgemoor has a post office with a zip code of 29712.
