= Old Horry County Courthouse =

- U.S. National Register of Historic Places
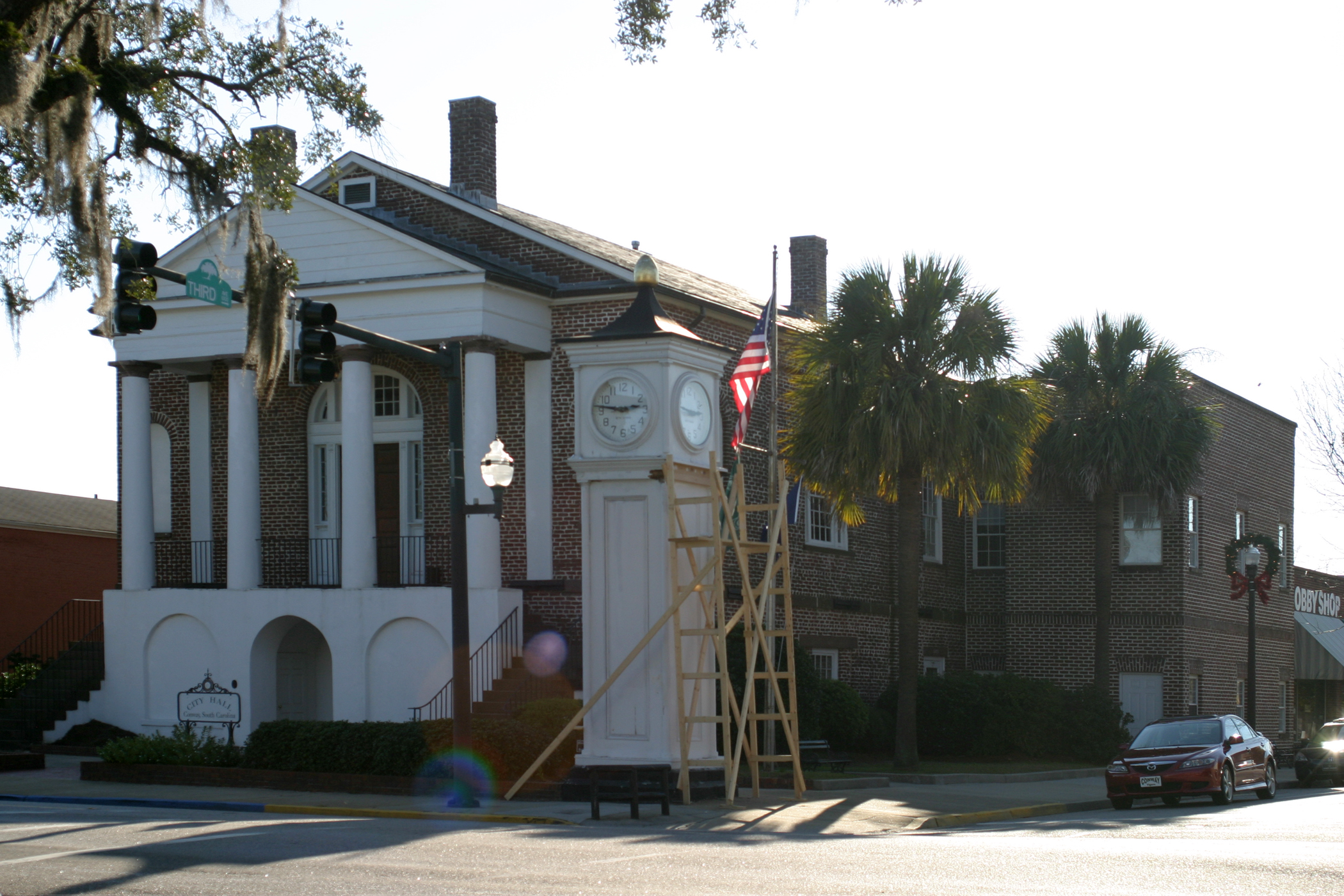
- Conway City Hall, November 2006

- Location within South Carolina Location within the United States
- Location: Main St., Conway, South Carolina
- Coordinates: 33°50′6″N 79°2′45″W
- Area: 1 acre (0.40 ha)
- Built: 1824
- Architect: Mills, Robert; Warren, Major Russell
- NRHP reference No.: 71000785
- Added to NRHP: April 7, 1971

Old Horry County Courthouse, now known as Conway City Hall, is a historic courthouse building located at Conway in Horry County, South Carolina. It was built between 1824 and 1825 and reputedly designed by Robert Mills (1781-1855). It is a two-story Classical Revival brick building. It features an extended pediment supported by Doric order columns that shelters a second story portico which does not extend the full width of the façade.

It was listed on the National Register of Historic Places in 1971.
