= Edgemoor Farm Dairy Barn =

- U.S. National Register of Historic Places
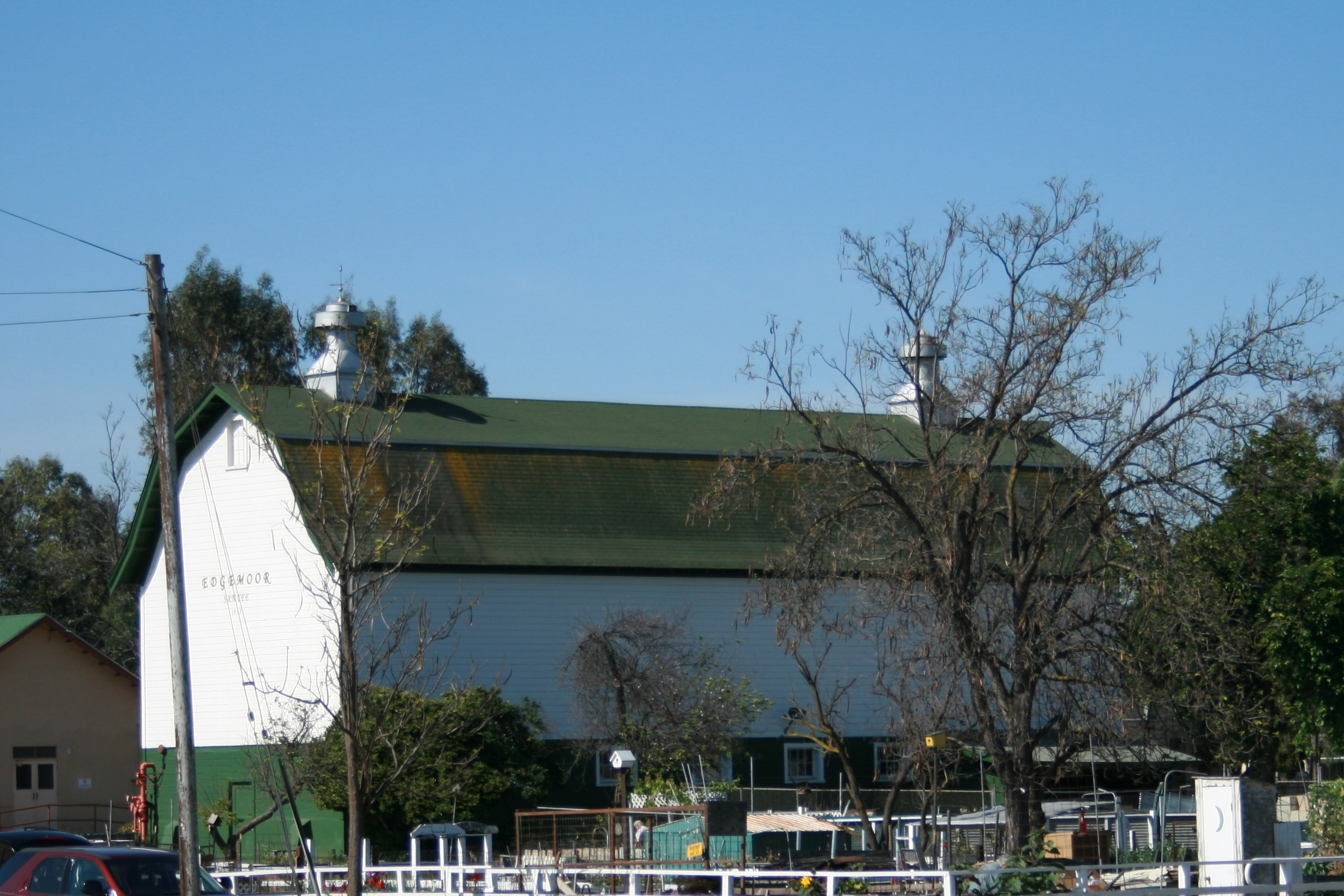

- Location within San Diego County, California Location within California Location within the United States
- Location: 9200 N Magnolia Magnolia, Santee, California
- Coordinates: 32°50′36″N 116°58′9″W
- Built: 1913
- NRHP reference No.: 85001065
- Added to NRHP: May 16, 1985

Edgemoor Farm Dairy Farm was built as part of a dairy farm in 1913 in Santee, California. Edgemoor was part of a Spanish land grant to Maria Antonio Estudillo who married Miguel de Pedrorena, a native of Madrid. By the 1850s, through a variety of ways, individuals obtained portions of the grant and began to farm. Walter Hamlin Dupee purchased Edgemoor Farm in 1913 and built it into a national award-winning dairy farm, and early tourist attraction.

Such was his prominence that the Guernsey Breeders Association in 1921 called his place "the foremost authority and breeder in the U.S.", having given the most grand champions at this ranch founded by John and Walter Dupee. Dupee said, "I am interested in pure breeding stock, modern equipment, and scientific methods, which I place at the disposal of all dairymen". A series of personal setbacks and problems brought Dupee to sell Edgemoor to Godfrey L. Strobeck.

== As a home for the aged and indigent ==
Following Edgemoor's glory days as a commercial dairy, the County of San Diego purchased the property from Godfrey L. Strobeck for use as a "last resort" home for the aged and indigent in 1923. It was one of the last poor farms (or farm homes) established in the United States prior to the Great Depression and the introduction of Social Security. By the mid-1920s the Edgemoor cared for 520 people. Throughout the years the County added new buildings; in 1950 apartments and wards were added. In 1953 the County of San Diego discontinued the farm, dairy operations and planned renovation of the barn. Two years later the place name was changed to Edgemoor Geriatric Hospital.

== As a geriatric hospital ==
Other buildings were demolished in 1957, 1959, 1960 and 1966, and a new hospital building was erected in 1966. The former milking barns were converted to living quarters. All of the original buildings of the Edgemoor Farm, including the Williamson Ranch House and the Dupee Ranch House are gone. Other early structures, such as the pony stables and milking barns, are either gone or irretrievably remodeled for other purposes. Only one building of the Dupee era remained: the Dutch gambrel roof barn, built in 1913.

A series of financial problems, facility issues, and basic care of patients, led to the decision to close Edgemoor Geriatric Hospital. The closure would facilitate the building of a new Edgemoor Hospital capable of caring for future generations of patients. The new facility opened January 23, 2009.

== Historic Registered Site ==
On April 17, 1985 a formal Nomination was sent to the National Park Service, to register the Santee Barn as a historic site. On May 16, 1986 The Santee Barn was added to the National Register of Historic Places. In the following years the Barn's address was changed from 9064 Edgemoor Drive to its current address at 9200 N. Magnolia Ave.

== Santee Historical Society Museum ==
Through the assistance of charitable donations, the Santee Barn is currently an active museum and house to the office of the Santee Historical Society.
