= SS Robert Mills =

Liberty ship of WWII

History

United States
- Name: Robert Mills
- Namesake: Robert Mills
- Owner: War Shipping Administration (WSA)
- Operator: Alcoa Steamship Co., Inc.
- Ordered: as type (EC2-S-C1) hull, MC hull 2498
- Awarded: April 23, 1943
- Builder: St. Johns River Shipbuilding Company, Jacksonville, Florida
- Cost: $964,345
- Yard number: 62
- Way number: 2
- Laid down: August 30, 1944
- Launched: October 5, 1944
- Sponsored by: Mrs. Cecil L. McCall
- Completed: October 14, 1944
- Identification: Call sign: KTEY
- Fate: Laid up in the National Defense Reserve Fleet, Mobile, Alabama, 16 October 1948; Sold for artificial reef program, 21 May 1975, withdrawn from fleet, 28 May 1975

General characteristics
- Class & type: Liberty ship; type EC2-S-C1, standard
- Tonnage: 10,865 LT DWT; 7,176 GRT
- Displacement: 3,380 long tons (3,434 t) (light); 14,245 long tons (14,474 t) (max)
- Length: 441 feet 6 inches (135 m) oa; 416 feet (127 m) pp; 427 feet (130 m) lwl
- Beam: 57 feet (17 m)
- Draft: 27 ft 9.25 in (8.4646 m)
- Installed power: 2 × Oil fired 450 °F (232 °C) boilers, operating at 220 psi (1,500 kPa); 2,500 hp (1,900 kW)
- Propulsion: 1 × triple-expansion steam engine, (manufactured by General Machinery Corp., Hamilton, Ohio); 1 × screw propeller
- Speed: 11.5 knots (21.3 km/h; 13.2 mph)
- Capacity: 562,608 cubic feet (15,931 m^{3}) (grain); 499,573 cubic feet (14,146 m^{3}) (bale)
- Complement: 38–62 USMM; 21–40 USNAG
- Armament: Varied by ship; Bow-mounted 3-inch (76 mm)/50-caliber gun; Stern-mounted 4-inch (102 mm)/50-caliber gun; 2–8 × single 20-millimeter (0.79 in) Oerlikon anti-aircraft (AA) cannons and/or, 2–8 × 37-millimeter (1.46 in) M1 AA guns

SS Robert Mills was a Liberty ship built in the United States during World War II. She was named after Robert Mills, a South Carolina architect known for designing both the first Washington Monument, located in Baltimore, Maryland, as well as the better known Washington Monument in the nation's capital, Washington, D.C.

== Construction ==
Robert Mills was laid down on August 30, 1944, under a Maritime Commission (MARCOM) contract, MC hull 2498, by the St. Johns River Shipbuilding Company, Jacksonville, Florida; she was sponsored by Mrs. Cecil L. McCall, the wife of St. Johns River SBC's leaderman, and was launched on 5 October 1944.

== History ==
She was allocated to the Alcoa Steamship Co., Inc. on October 14, 1944. On October 21, 1948, she was laid up in the National Defense Reserve Fleet in Mobile, Alabama. She was transferred for use as an artificial reef, May 21, 1975, to the state of Alabama. She was removed from the fleet, 28 May 1975. She was sunk 24 October 1975, at 30°04′6″N 88°06′45″W.

== Bibliography ==
- "St. John's River Shipbuilding, Jacksonville FL". www.ShipbuildingHistory.com. October 16, 2010.
- Maritime Administration. "Robert Mills". Ship History Database Vessel Status Card. U.S. Department of Transportation, Maritime Administration.
- Davies, James (May 2004). "Specifications (As-Built)" (PDF). p. 23.
- "SS Robert Mills".
