= Robert Mills (architect) =

American architect

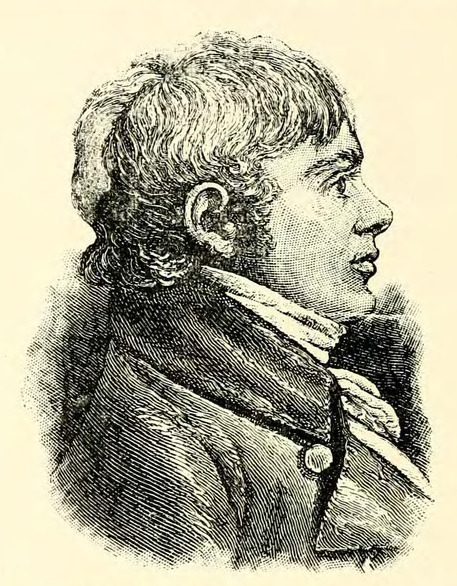
- Born: August 12, 1781; Charleston, South Carolina, U.S.
- Died: March 3, 1855 (aged 73); Washington D.C., U.S.
- Education: College of Charleston and James Hoban
- Occupations: Architect and engineer
- Spouse: Eliza Barnwell Smith

Robert Mills (August 12, 1781 – March 3, 1855) was an American architect and cartographer best known for designing both the first Washington Monument in Baltimore, Maryland, as well as the better known Washington Monument in Washington, D.C. He is sometimes said to be the first native-born American to be professionally trained as an architect. Charles Bulfinch of Boston perhaps has a clearer claim to this honor.

Mills studied in Charleston, South Carolina, as a student in the lower school at the College of Charleston and of Irish architect James Hoban, and later worked with him on his commission for the White House. This became the official home of US presidents. Both Hoban and Mills were Freemasons. Mills also studied and worked with Benjamin Henry Latrobe of Philadelphia. He designed numerous buildings in Philadelphia, Baltimore, and South Carolina, where he was appointed as superintendent of public buildings. His Washington Monument in Washington, DC was not completed until 1885, 30 years after his death.

== Early life and education ==
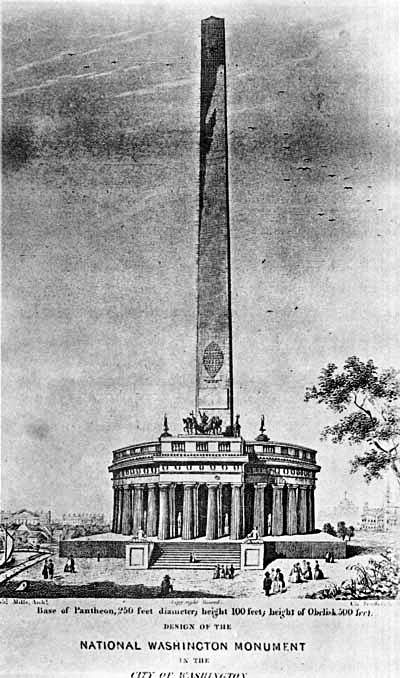
Mills' proposed design for the Washington Monument in Washington, D.C.

Born in Charleston, South Carolina, to Ann (Taylor) and William Mills, Robert received private education as a child and later attended the lower school of the College of Charleston. He then studied with Irish architect James Hoban.

== Career ==
Mills followed his mentor Hoban to Washington, D.C. after he received a commission for design and construction of the White House in the new capital. During this time, Mills met Thomas Jefferson, who became the first full-term resident of the new presidential residence as the nation's third president. In 1802, Mills moved to Philadelphia, where he became an associate and student of Benjamin Henry Latrobe. Philadelphia buildings designed by Mills are Washington Hall, Sansom Street Baptist Church, and the Octagon Church for the First Unitarian Church of Philadelphia. He also designed the Upper Ferry Bridge covering.

In 1807, Mills designed the First Presbyterian Church in Augusta, Georgia, built between 1809 and 1812. In 1808, Mills created blueprints for a prison to be used mostly for reform of prisoners. In 1811, the prison was constructed in Mt. Holly, New Jersey. "With the possible' exception of Eastern States Penitentiary in Philadelphia, it is considered "the most significant prison building in the United States", according to the Historic Burlington County Prison Museum Association. Also in 1811, Mills was involved in a significant renovation and remodeling of [Old] St. Mary's Church in Burlington, New Jersey, including the addition of a new semi-octagonal apse on the east end of the building. In 1812, Mills designed the Monumental Church in Richmond, Virginia. It was built to commemorate the deaths of 72 people in the Richmond Theatre fire.

Moving to Baltimore, Maryland, Mills designed St. John's Episcopal Church, the Maryland House of Industry, the First Baptist Church of Baltimore at South Sharp and West Lombard streets in 1817, and a Greek Revival mansion at the northeast corner of West Franklin and Cathedral streets (across from the Old Baltimore Cathedral/Basilica of the Assumption of Mary). The mansion was later occupied from 1857 to 1892 by the Maryland Club, a dining and leisure society of Southern-leaning gentlemen.

Mills designed the nation's first Washington Monument, located in Baltimore with four surrounding park squares. These were named Washington Place along the north–south axis of North Charles Street, and Mount Vernon Place along East and West Monument streets. This development took place in the new Mount Vernon-Belvedere neighborhood.

This land had formerly been a part of Howard's Woods, the country estate and mansion "Belvedere" of Col. John Eager Howard (1752–1827), north of old Baltimore Town. Howard was a Revolutionary War commander of the famed "Maryland Line" regiment of the Continental Army. Construction on Baltimore's signature landmark began in 1815 and was completed in 1829.

In 1820, Mills was appointed as acting commissioner of the Board of Public Works in South Carolina. In 1823, he was the superintendent of public buildings. In the next few years, he designed numerous buildings in South Carolina, including court houses, the campus of the University of South Carolina, jails, and the Fireproof Building in Charleston. In 1825, he published the Atlas of the State of South Carolina. One year later, he published Statistics of South Carolina.

He designed the Old Horry County Courthouse, Union County Jail, and Wilson House, which have been listed on the National Register of Historic Places.

In 1836, Mills won the competition for the design of the Washington Monument on the future Mall of the National Capital, Washington D.C. This is his best known work. Construction began in 1848, but was interrupted in 1854 and postponed by the outbreak of the American Civil War. Construction of the monument resumed in 1879 after the Reconstruction era. It was dedicated in 1885, thirty years after the architect's death.

He also designed the Department of Treasury building, east of the Executive Mansion (White House), and several other federal buildings in Washington, D. C., including the U.S. Patent Office Building, patterned after the Parthenon. It has been renovated and adapted as two adjoining museums of the Smithsonian Institution: the Smithsonian American Art Museum and the National Portrait Gallery. He also designed the old General Post Office.

In South Carolina, Mills designed county courthouses in at least 18 counties, some of the public buildings in the capital Columbia, and a few private homes. He also designed portions of the Landsford Canal in Chester County, on the Catawba River in South Carolina.

Mills was an early advocate of fireproof construction. When a fire broke out in the Kingstree, South Carolina Building, which he designed, the county records on the first floor were protected due to his fireproofing measures. But a fire destroyed much of his Lancaster County, South Carolina Courthouse in August 2008.

== Death and legacy ==
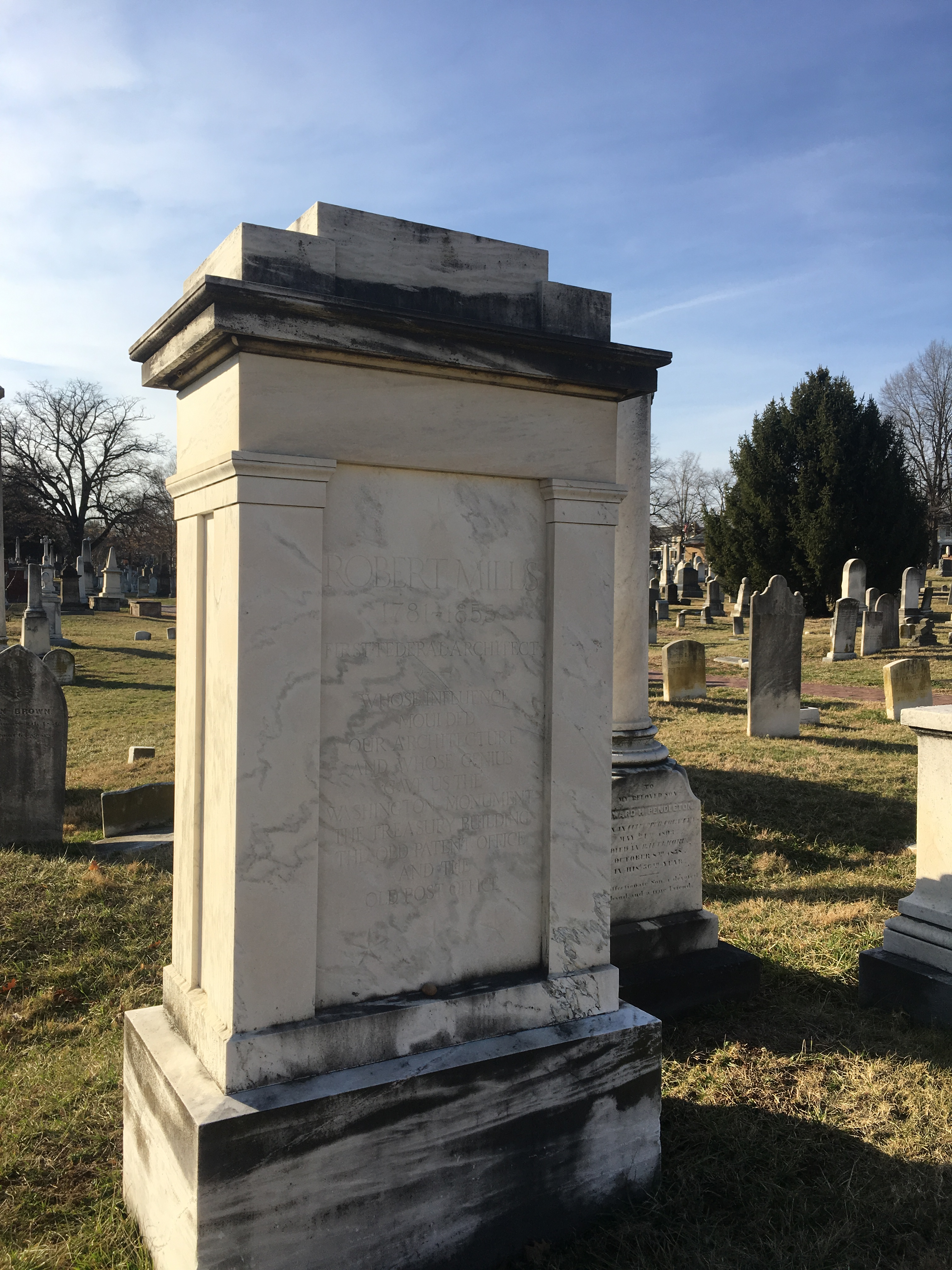
The headstone of Robert Mills in the Congressional Cemetery

Mills died in Washington, D.C., in 1855. He was buried there at the Congressional Cemetery. In 2007, Mills was inducted into the South Carolina Business Hall of Fame.

=== Architectural style ===
The broadest context for Mills' architecture was neoclassical architecture. This was the dominant style of building that was winning architectural design competitions and major projects of the time, both in Europe and in the United States. Under the umbrella of neoclassicism, his designs were partly Palladian, Georgian, and often Greek Revival.

Apart from stylistic movements in architecture going on in the world, Mills was involved in the more local context of building in the Mid-Atlantic States. There, and especially in Washington D.C., many figures were contributing architecture of high quality. To build as Mills did on what is now the National Mall, he had to contend with the strictures of the plan by Pierre Charles L'Enfant, as well as Andrew and Joseph Ellicott. He was likely also influenced by the powerful example of Thomas Jefferson and his Jeffersonian architecture. Mills created a distinctive brand of the federal style.

=== Honors ===
- The World War II Liberty Ship SS Robert Mills was named in his honor.

== See also ==
- Robert Mills Buildings
- Good Samaritan Hospital (Cincinnati)
- John Henry Devereux, fellow South Carolina architect

Preceded by	Federal Architect; 1836–1842	Succeeded by Ammi B. Young, as Federal Architectural Advisor
