= The Myrtle Beach Herald =

The Myrtle Beach Herald is a weekly newspaper published in Myrtle Beach, South Carolina, in the United States. It is published every Friday and serves the Grand Strand region of South Carolina. It was founded in 1993 by Deborah Boggs Johnson and sold to Greg Everett in 2003. The paper is now owned by Waccamaw Publishers, the same company that owns The Horry Independent, The Carolina Forest Chronicle and The Loris Scene. Janet Morgan is the paper's editor.
