= Conway–Horry County Airport =

- IATA: none; ICAO: KHYW; FAA LID: HYW

Summary
- Airport type: Public
- Owner: Horry County Department of Airports
- Serves: Conway, South Carolina
- Location: U.S. Route 378
- Elevation AMSL: 35 ft (11 m)
- Coordinates: 33°49′42″N 079°07′19″W

Map
- Location of airport in South Carolina

Runways
Direction	Length		Surface
Direction	ft	m	Surface
4/22	4,401	1,341	Asphalt

Statistics (2007)
- Aircraft operations: 43,050
- Based aircraft: 39
- Source: Federal Aviation Administration

Conway–Horry County Airport (ICAO: KHYW, FAA LID: HYW) is a county-owned public-use airport located three nautical miles (6 km) west of the central business district of Conway, a city in Horry County, South Carolina, United States.

Conway–Horry County airport serves mostly general aviation with maintenance and refueling of aircraft. The airport is located off of U.S. Route 378 west of the city of Conway. The airport has one runway and covers 265 acres (1.07 km^{2}) of land.

Although most U.S. airports use the same three-letter location identifier for the FAA and IATA, this airport is assigned HYW by the FAA but has no designation from the IATA.

== Facilities and aircraft ==
Conway–Horry County Airport covers an area of 265 acres (107 ha) at an elevation of 35 feet (11 m) above mean sea level. It has one runway designated 4/22 with a 4,401 by 75 ft (1,341 x 23 m) asphalt surface.

== See also ==
- List of airports in South Carolina
- Myrtle Beach International Airport
