= Chester County, South Carolina =

County in South Carolina, United States

- County
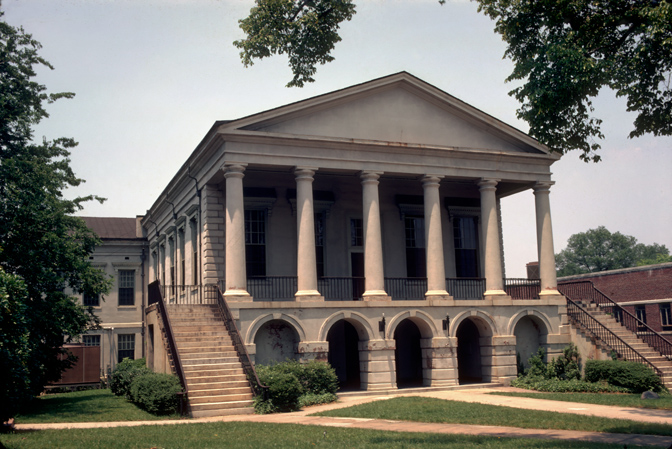
- Chester County Courthouse

- Seal
- Motto(s): "Choose Chester County, For Business. For Life."
- Location within the U.S. state of South Carolina
- Interactive map of Chester County, South Carolina
- Coordinates: 34.69°N 81.16°W
- Country: United States
- State: South Carolina
- Founded: 1785
- Named for: Chester, Pennsylvania (Chester, England)
- Seat: Chester
- Largest community: Chester

Area
  - Total: 586.16 sq mi (1,518.1 km^{2})
  - Land: 580.66 sq mi (1,503.9 km^{2})
  - Water: 5.50 sq mi (14.2 km^{2}) 0.94%

Population (2020)
  - Total: 32,294
  - Estimate (2025): 33,001 ▲
  - Density: 55.616/sq mi (21.473/km^{2})
- Time zone: UTC−5 (Eastern)
  - Summer (DST): UTC−4 (EDT)
- Congressional district: 5th
- Website: chestercountysc.gov

Chester County is a county located in the U.S. state of South Carolina. As of the 2020 census, its population was 32,294. Its county seat is Chester. Chester County is included in the Charlotte metropolitan area.

== History ==
The county was founded in 1785 and was named after Chester, Pennsylvania. The largest community and county seat is Chester. The county is also included in the Charlotte metropolitan area.

== Geography ==
According to the U.S. Census Bureau, the county has a total area of 586.16 square miles (1,518.1 km^{2}), of which 580.66 square miles (1,503.9 km^{2}) is land and 5.50 square miles (14.2 km^{2}) (0.94%) is water.

=== National protected area ===
- Sumter National Forest (part)

=== State and local protected areas ===
- Chester State Park
- Landsford Canal Forest Legacy Area
- Landsford Canal State Park

=== Major water bodies ===
- Broad River
- Catawba River

=== Adjacent counties ===
- York County – north
- Lancaster County – east
- Fairfield County – south
- Union County – west

=== Major highways ===
- I-77
- US 21
- US 321
- US 321 Bus.
- SC 9
- SC 9 Bus.
- SC 49
- SC 72
- SC 97
- SC 99
- SC 121
- SC 215
- SC 223
- SC 901
- SC 909

== Demographics ==
Historical population
Census	Pop.	Note	%±
1790	6,866		—
1800	8,185		19.2%
1810	11,479		40.2%
1820	14,189		23.6%
1830	17,182		21.1%
1840	17,747		3.3%
1850	18,038		1.6%
1860	18,122		0.5%
1870	18,805		3.8%
1880	24,153		28.4%
1890	26,660		10.4%
1900	28,616		7.3%
1910	29,425		2.8%
1920	33,389		13.5%
1930	31,803		−4.8%
1940	32,579		2.4%
1950	32,597		0.1%
1960	30,888		−5.2%
1970	29,811		−3.5%
1980	30,148		1.1%
1990	32,170		6.7%
2000	34,068		5.9%
2010	33,140		−2.7%
2020	32,294		−2.6%
2025 (est.)	33,001	▲	2.2%
U.S. Decennial Census; 1790–1960 1900–1990; 1990–2000 2010 2020

=== Racial and ethnic composition ===
Chester County, South Carolina – Racial and ethnic composition Note: the US Census treats Hispanic/Latino as an ethnic category. This table excludes Latinos from the racial categories and assigns them to a separate category. Hispanics/Latinos may be of any race.
Race / Ethnicity (NH = Non-Hispanic)	Pop 1980	Pop 1990	Pop 2000	Pop 2010	Pop 2020	% 1980	% 1990	% 2000	% 2010	% 2020
White alone (NH)	18,366	19,154	20,304	19,590	18,591	60.92%	59.54%	59.60%	59.11%	57.57%
Black or African American alone (NH)	11,513	12,830	13,109	12,349	11,287	38.19%	39.88%	38.48%	37.26%	34.95%
Native American or Alaska Native alone (NH)	27	71	104	130	145	0.09%	0.22%	0.31%	0.39%	0.45%
Asian alone (NH)	30	35	96	104	146	0.10%	0.11%	0.28%	0.31%	0.45%
Native Hawaiian or Pacific Islander alone (NH)	x	x	2	5	14	x	x	0.01%	0.02%	0.04%
Other race alone (NH)	0	0	16	40	133	0.00%	0.00%	0.05%	0.12%	0.41%
Mixed race or Multiracial (NH)	x	x	182	443	1,183	x	x	0.53%	1.34%	3.66%
Hispanic or Latino (any race)	212	80	255	479	795	0.70%	0.25%	0.75%	1.45%	2.46%
Total	30,148	32,170	34,068	33,140	32,294	100.00%	100.00%	100.00%	100.00%	100.00%

=== 2020 census ===
As of the 2020 census, there were 32,294 people, 12,928 households, and 8,042 families residing in the county.

The median age was 43.4 years, 22.1% of residents were under the age of 18, and 19.4% were 65 years of age or older; for every 100 females there were 92.9 males and for every 100 females age 18 and over there were 89.6 males age 18 and over.

The racial makeup of the county was 58.1% White, 35.1% Black or African American, 0.5% American Indian and Alaska Native, 0.5% Asian, 0.0% Native Hawaiian and Pacific Islander, 1.5% from some other race, and 4.3% from two or more races. Hispanic or Latino residents of any race comprised 2.5% of the population.

26.7% of residents lived in urban areas, while 73.3% lived in rural areas.

There were 12,928 households in the county, of which 29.9% had children under the age of 18 living with them and 32.8% had a female householder with no spouse or partner present. About 27.7% of all households were made up of individuals and 13.0% had someone living alone who was 65 years of age or older.

There were 14,601 housing units, of which 11.5% were vacant. Among occupied housing units, 74.3% were owner-occupied and 25.7% were renter-occupied. The homeowner vacancy rate was 0.9% and the rental vacancy rate was 10.4%.

=== 2010 census ===
At the 2010 census, there were 33,140 people, 12,876 households, and 9,073 families living in the county. The population density was 57.1 inhabitants per square mile (22.0/km^{2}). There were 14,701 housing units at an average density of 25.3 units per square mile (9.8 units/km^{2}). The racial makeup of the county was 59.8% white, 37.4% black or African American, 0.4% American Indian, 0.3% Asian, 0.6% from other races, and 1.5% from two or more races. Those of Hispanic or Latino origin made up 1.4% of the population. In terms of ancestry, 19.9% were American, 7.5% were Irish, 5.6% were English, and 5.1% were German.

Of the 12,876 households, 34.1% had children under the age of 18 living with them, 44.5% were married couples living together, 19.8% had a female householder with no husband present, 29.5% were non-families, and 25.9% of all households were made up of individuals. The average household size was 2.56 and the average family size was 3.04. The median age was 40.3 years.

The median income for a household in the county was $32,743 and the median income for a family was $42,074. Males had a median income of $39,008 versus $27,701 for females. The per capita income for the county was $17,687. About 18.6% of families and 21.4% of the population were below the poverty line, including 30.0% of those under age 18 and 18.0% of those age 65 or over.

=== 2000 census ===
At the 2000 census, there were 34,068 people, 12,880 households, and 9,338 families living in the county. The population density was 59 people per square mile (23 people/km^{2}). There were 14,374 housing units at an average density of 25 units per square mile (9.7 units/km^{2}). The racial makeup of the county was 59.93% White, 38.65% Black or African American, 0.33% Native American, 0.28% Asian, 0.01% Pacific Islander, 0.25% from other races, and 0.55% from two or more races. 0.75% of the population were Hispanic or Latino of any race.

There were 12,880 households, out of which 32.90% had children under the age of 18 living with them, 48.80% were married couples living together, 18.60% had a female householder with no husband present, and 27.50% were non-families. 24.20% of all households were made up of individuals, and 9.90% had someone living alone who was 65 years of age or older. The average household size was 2.62 and the average family size was 3.11.

In the county, the population was spread out, with 26.90% under the age of 18, 8.40% from 18 to 24, 28.20% from 25 to 44, 23.80% from 45 to 64, and 12.70% who were 65 years of age or older. The median age was 36 years. For every 100 females there were 92.50 males. For every 100 females age 18 and over, there were 87.60 males.

The median income for a household in the county was $32,425, and the median income for a family was $38,087. Males had a median income of $30,329 versus $21,570 for females. The per capita income for the county was $14,709. About 11.90% of families and 15.30% of the population were below the poverty line, including 21.20% of those under age 18 and 14.90% of those age 65 or over.

== Law and government ==
=== Law enforcement ===
In 2021, Chester County Sheriff Alex Underwood was found guilty of conspiracy, wire fraud, deprivation of rights and federal program theft, and sentenced to one year in prison.

=== Politics ===
United States presidential election results for Chester County, South Carolina
Year	Republican		Democratic		Third party(ies)	
Year	No.	%	No.	%	No.	%
1900	20	2.34%	836	97.66%	0	0.00%
1904	8	0.83%	954	99.17%	0	0.00%
1912	0	0.00%	1,286	98.47%	20	1.53%
1916	17	1.42%	1,182	98.42%	2	0.17%
1920	0	0.00%	1,237	100.00%	0	0.00%
1924	12	1.38%	850	97.93%	6	0.69%
1928	36	2.72%	1,285	97.13%	2	0.15%
1932	23	1.13%	2,020	98.87%	0	0.00%
1936	11	0.51%	2,155	99.49%	0	0.00%
1940	35	1.78%	1,930	98.12%	2	0.10%
1944	89	5.48%	1,441	88.68%	95	5.85%
1948	48	2.39%	436	21.67%	1,528	75.94%
1952	2,777	49.41%	2,843	50.59%	0	0.00%
1956	1,007	21.43%	2,951	62.80%	741	15.77%
1960	1,660	28.03%	4,262	71.97%	0	0.00%
1964	2,915	42.89%	3,882	57.11%	0	0.00%
1968	2,862	33.71%	2,865	33.75%	2,762	32.54%
1972	4,724	66.20%	2,352	32.96%	60	0.84%
1976	2,982	36.31%	5,200	63.32%	30	0.37%
1980	3,104	37.12%	5,145	61.52%	114	1.36%
1984	4,441	55.20%	3,559	44.24%	45	0.56%
1988	3,968	51.21%	3,737	48.23%	43	0.55%
1992	3,451	33.54%	5,458	53.05%	1,379	13.40%
1996	3,157	34.80%	5,108	56.31%	807	8.90%
2000	4,986	47.80%	5,242	50.25%	204	1.96%
2004	5,798	49.43%	5,790	49.36%	141	1.20%
2008	6,318	45.19%	7,478	53.49%	185	1.32%
2012	6,367	44.19%	7,891	54.77%	149	1.03%
2016	7,265	51.19%	6,579	46.36%	348	2.45%
2020	8,660	54.96%	6,941	44.05%	156	0.99%
2024	9,030	58.05%	6,353	40.84%	173	1.11%

== Economy ==
Chester County's economy has an industrial and agricultural base with large areas used for timber production. There are several sawmills in the county and others near it. Forest land ownership is majority family landowners who manage their properties for a variety of uses. Agriculture is also a big segment of the economy with crops consisting of cotton, wheat, oats, rye, beef and dairy cattle, hay, corn, peaches, other vegetables, peanuts, soybeans, and pecans.

In 2022, the GDP of Chester County was $1.4 billion (about $43,999 per capita). In chained 2017 dollars, its real GDP was $1.1 billion (about $35,382 per capita). Throughout 2022 to 2024, the unemployment rate has fluctuated between 3.1% and 5.6%.

As of April 2024, some of the largest employers in the county include Chester County School District, E & J Gallo Winery, and Walmart.

Employment and Wage Statistics by Industry in Chester County, South Carolina
Industry	Employment Counts	Employment Percentage (%)	Average Annual Wage ($)
Accommodation and Food Services	570	6.2	19,136
Administrative and Support and Waste Management and Remediation Services	126	1.4	35,048
Agriculture, Forestry, Fishing and Hunting	111	1.2	50,908
Construction	685	7.5	63,908
Finance and Insurance	125	1.4	50,076
Health Care and Social Assistance	781	8.5	46,072
Manufacturing	3,449	37.5	64,584
Other Services (except Public Administration)	180	2.0	30,264
Professional, Scientific, and Technical Services	211	2.3	103,532
Public Administration	652	7.1	46,748
Real Estate and Rental and Leasing	16	0.2	41,704
Retail Trade	875	9.5	26,520
Transportation and Warehousing	369	4.0	53,300
Utilities	120	1.3	74,048
Wholesale Trade	921	10.0	67,392
Total	9,191	100.0%	54,620

== Media ==
- Chester Vision or CSN
- Chester News & Reporter
- WRBK, 90.3 FM, a noncommercial station that primarily features classic oldies

== Communities ==
=== City ===
- Chester (county seat and largest community)

=== Towns ===
- Fort Lawn
- Great Falls
- Lowrys
- Richburg

=== Census-designated places ===
- Eureka Mill
- Gayle Mill

=== Unincorporated communities ===
- Blackstock
- Edgemoor
- Lando
- Leeds
- Sandy River
- Wilksburg

== Notable people ==
- John Adair, (1757–1840), born in Chester County (although at the time it was believed to be part of Anson County, North Carolina), became a member of the United States House of Representatives and the United States Senate, and the 8th governor of Kentucky
- John P. Gaston (1930–2014), politician who represented the county in the South Carolina House of Representatives
- Thomas Griffin and Meeks Griffin, were wrongly executed in South Carolina by electric chair in 1915. They were framed in Chester County in 1913 and pardoned in 2009.

== See also ==
- List of counties in South Carolina
- National Register of Historic Places listings in Chester County, South Carolina
- Tryon County, North Carolina, former county in North Carolina which included modern-day parts of Chester County
