= Abbrescia =

Abbrescia is an Italian surname. Notable people with the surname include:

- Dino Abbrescia (born 1966), Italian actor
- Joe Abbrescia (1936–2005), American painter
- Simeone Di Cagno Abbrescia (1944–2024), Italian politician
