= Four Seasons Arena =

Multi purpose arena in Montana

- Interactive map of Four Seasons Arena
- Location: 400 3rd Street NW, Great Falls, Montana, U.S.
- Coordinates: 47°30′52″N 111°19′12″W
- Owner: Cascade County, Montana
- Operator: Cascade County, Montana
- Capacity: Basketball: 5,054; Concert: 5,870; Rodeo: 4,146

Construction
- Opened: 1979

Tenants
- Great Falls Americans (WHL) (1979–1980); Great Falls Americans (AFHL/AWHL) (1995–2003); Great Falls Explorers (CBA) (2006–2008)

Four Seasons Arena (officially Pacific Steel & Recycling Four Seasons Arena) is a multi-purpose indoor sports and exhibition arena located in the city of Great Falls, Montana, in the United States. Constructed in 1979, it served primarily as an ice rink until 2005. The failure of the practice rink's refrigeration system in 2003 and the management's decision to close the main rink in 2006 led to the facility's reconfiguration as an indoor sports and exhibition space. In November 2018, the Cascade County Commission, in conjunction with the Great Falls TIBD, and the Great Falls Lodging Association began to develop a plan to replace the arena. At a cost of 86 million dollars, the proposed arena will seat between 10,000 and 12,000 people. The bond is expected to go before voters in November 2019. As of May 2011 it is the largest exhibition, music, and sports venue in the city.

== Conception and construction ==
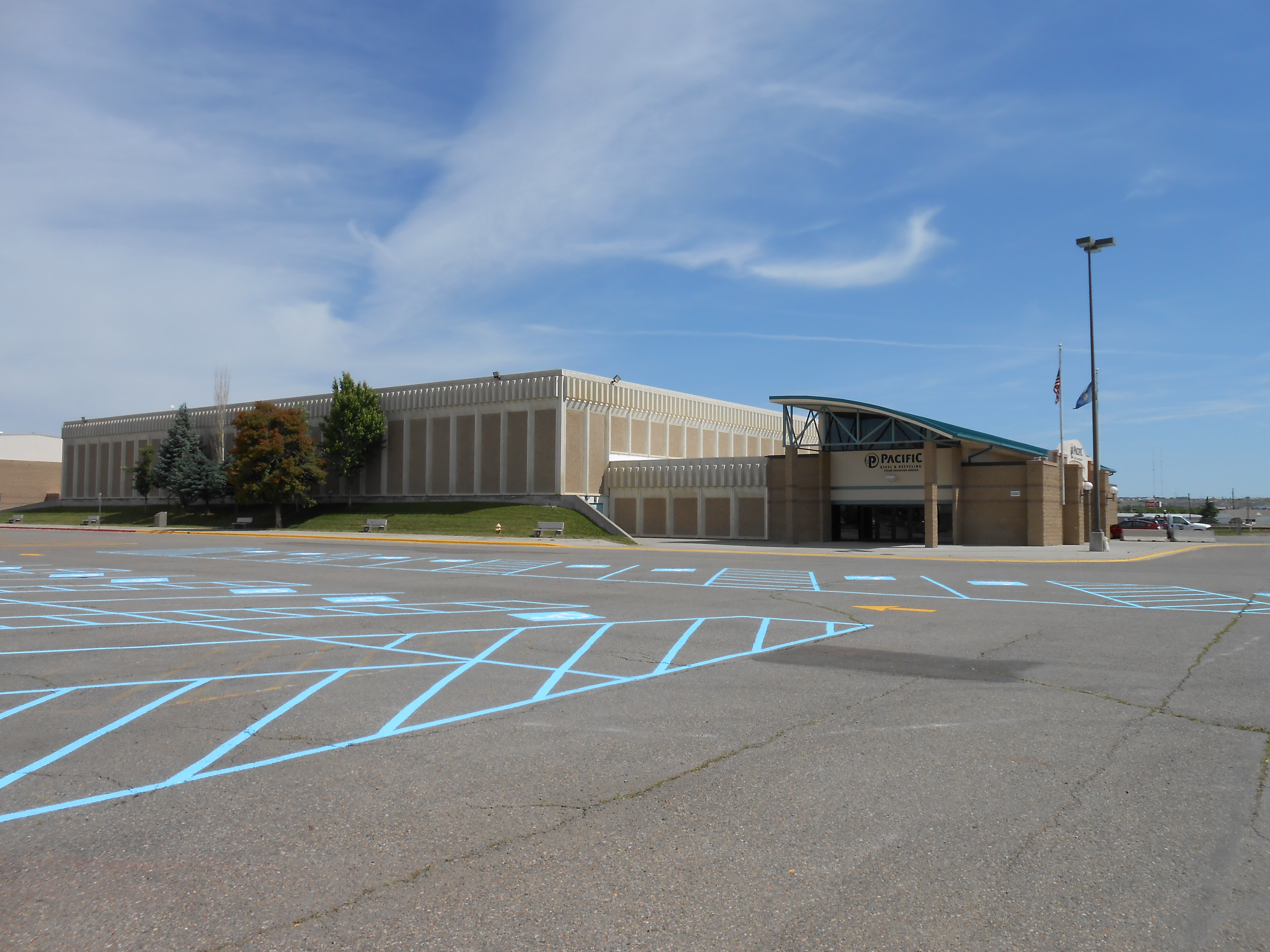
Four Seasons Arena

Prior to the construction of Four Seasons Arena, the city of Great Falls had no large indoor sports arena. The gymnasium at Great Falls High School, built in 1930, sat about 1,200 on wooden benches in an area designed for use primarily as a basketball court. The Great Falls Civic Center, built in 1939, contained an ice rink but no other sports facilities. The College of Great Falls built the McLaughlin Center in 1966, which contained an Olympic-size swimming pool and 1,800-seat gym designed for use as a basketball court. The city's largest sports venue was the gymnasium at Charles M. Russell High School. The gym, constructed in 1963, sat 4,000 in a basketball court.

The lack of a large indoor sports center inhibited the growth of professional sports in the city, as well as the city's ability to host major high school athletic tournaments. In 1975, the city of Billings constructed the Montana's Entertainment, Trade and Recreation Arena (or METRA), a 12,000 seat multi-purpose arena. In 1977, an organization known as Leadership Great Falls (a program of the Great Falls Area Chamber of Commerce) undertook a process to provide city civic and business leaders with a vision for the city of Great Falls. Out of this year-long process came the request for the city to construct a large, multi-purpose, indoor sports arena. Great Falls City Commissioner John St. Jermain championed the effort to build an arena, and fought for a ballot initiative in 1977 that would have used city tax dollars to build it. But voters rejected the proposal. St. Jermain then sought and won in 1978 a federal grant to pay for the majority of the cost of constructing the facility. St. Jermain lost reelection in November 1978.

The Four Seasons Arena was built in 1979 on the grounds of the Montana State Fairgrounds (now known as Montana ExpoPark). Because it was built primarily with the federal grant and few other funds, the arena was half the size initially proposed. Indeed, Four Seasons Arena was built primarily as an ice rink. It also lacked air conditioning. The arena originally housed two ice rinks: A main 33,000 square feet (3,100 m^{2}) rink and a 17,000 square feet (1,600 m^{2}) "side" or practice rink. With four days' notice, the main ice rink could be thawed and flooring laid down to transform the main section of the arena from an ice rink into a basketball court, rodeo arena, or exhibition hall. Removal and restoration of the ice took another four days. As initially constructed, Four Seasons Arena had a seating capacity in the main arena of 6,314.

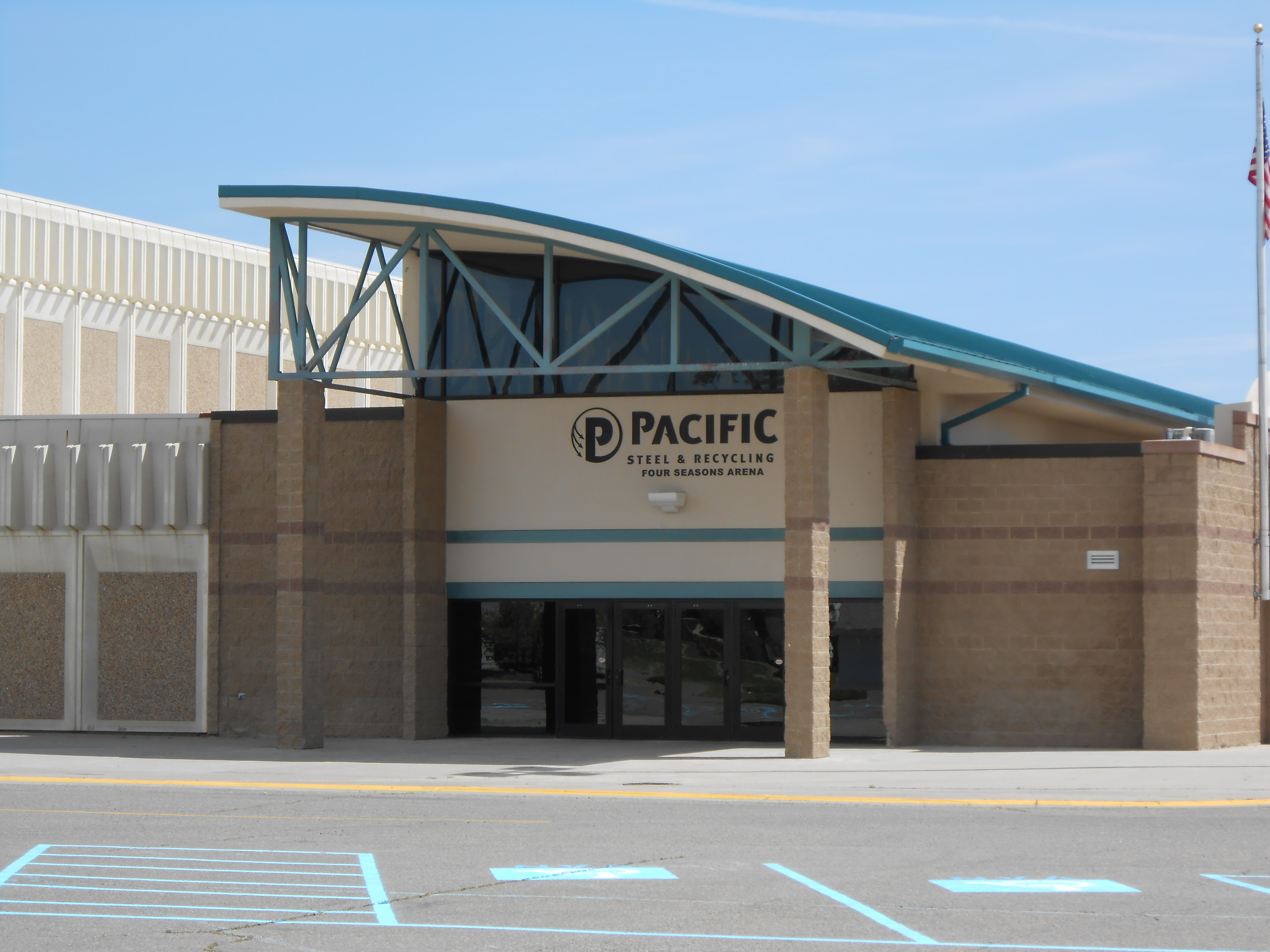
Main entrance

In 1994, Great Falls city voters approved a $7.9 million bond initiative to build a new exhibition hall on the fairgrounds, renovate the fair's historic buildings and Four Seasons Arena, and generally improve landscaping, lighting, and walkways at the fair. The 15,000 square feet (1,400 m^{2}) Exhibition Hall (capable of seating up to 1,500 people) was constructed in 1995.

== Operating history ==
Cascade County owned the Montana State Fairgrounds, and built Four Seasons Arena. Although not designed to be a multi-purpose arena, Four Seasons began to be put to a wide variety of uses. The facility quickly began to show excessive wear due to these pressures. The facility's management also began to suffer. By 1987, the Fairgrounds were more than $600,000 in debt and the county's management of the Fairgrounds and Four Seasons Arena was heavily criticized. In 1988, Cascade County signed an agreement under which the city of Great Falls took over management of the fairgrounds and Four Seasons Arena. But the facility was already deteriorating. In 1988, the Montana High School Association (which schedules high school athletic tournaments) refused to allow the city to host any basketball tournaments at Four Seasons Arena after 1989 because it was in such poor shape. In March 1989, the Montana Class B boys' high school basketball tournament was scheduled to be played at Four Seasons Arena, but a major leak in the roof two weeks before the tournament forced the event to be held at nearby C.M. Russell High School instead.

In early 2001, the heating and ventilation at Four Seasons Arena was upgraded for the first time since its construction at a cost of $124,100. Concerned about the stability of the ice at Four Seasons, the city also commissioned a study of both rinks. The study concluded that both rinks needed $1.5 million in repairs and upgrades. But this study was not acted on. The city's management of the facility had also not gone smoothly. Nearly 20 groups which used the facility frequently (hockey teams, exhibitors, rodeo promoters, etc.), but relations between the groups were very poor and various groups accused city managers of playing politics in order to favor one group over another. In June 2001, city managers held an extraordinary day-long meeting of the arena's users in an attempt mediate these differences. This meeting led to a major proposal to upgrade the arena. In August 2001, the various user groups proposed that the city spend $99,000 to purchase a new floor covering for the main ice rink that would reduce the lead-time for transformation of the main arena to just four hours. But this proposal was not acted on. Instead, city managers said the most urgent needs at Four Seasons involved wooded dashers (waist-high walls) around the rink, a new cover for the ice (to keep it cold when not in use), portable bleachers to expand seating, upgrading and replacement of power lines and poles, a new scoreboard, and improvements to make the facility comply with the Americans With Disabilities Act.

The city's management agreement came to an end in 2003. City managers argued that they should be allowed to renew the contract. The city proposed using its own funds to renovate the arena, and to begin the process of planning for a new, greatly expanded multi-purpose convention center and sports arena. As a gesture of good faith, Great Falls city commissioners said they had spent $6,000 to study the ice rink covering issue and $2,000 on a handicapped-accessibility study, and had agreed to spend $200,000 to purchase the ice rink covering. The purchased was designed to meet the needs of local youth hockey organizations, which in 2002 were the arena's largest tenant (paying $65,000 in fees in 2002 and an anticipated $85,000 in fees in 2003). But it was also designed to expand the facility's use, and reduce the city's subsidy to the fairgrounds. Four Seasons managers noted that the arena had to turn away bands, comedians, and other entertainers because the venue could not be turned around fast enough. Cascade County managers, however, argued that although the county did not have the credit rating or tax revenues of the city, they could obtain grants to make the improvements the city was to pay for. They also said that their lack of management expertise did not matter, as they were considering contracting with SMG World, an arena management firm, to run Four Seasons. In October 2002, SMG said it needed more time to assess the fairgrounds in order to make a firm offer. With Cascade County apparently committed to taking over the fairgrounds and Four Seasons Arena again, the city of Great Falls demanded that the county to pay $1 million to reimburse the city for improvements made there (a figure which included $142,250 renovating the heating, air conditioning, and carpeting at the arena). The county refused, and offered to pay less than 20% of that figure. After extensive negotiations, Cascade County agreed to pay $384,370 over 10 years at 4% interest (a total which included all of the improvements to the arena). On November 12, 2002, Cascade County signed a formal agreement to allow SMG World to take over management of the fairgrounds and arena.

SMG's management of Four Seasons Arena and Montana State Fairgrounds lasted just five years. Although the city had already studied capital needs at the fair, Cascade County paid SMG another $57,750 to do so itself. SMG discovered severe problems with both ice rinks. In February 2003, it reported that the practice ice rink had leaked and the ice was at a 3 inches (7.6 cm) slant, which created a legal liability issue for the county. SMG proposed immediately closing the practice rink, and said that fixing the leaks would cost $600,000 to $750,000. Another $150,000 needed to be spent to replace the dashers on the main rink to prevent them from collapsing and injuring players and/or fans.

The ice rink problem highlighted a major issue confronting Four Seasons Arena. The cost of running an average four-day basketball tournament was about $16,000, and the arena lost about $3,000 per tournament. But basketball tournaments generated more than $1 million in additional spending to the city, far more than the revenues generated by ice hockey and more than enough to cover the losses on the tournament. Permanently losing some or all of the ice at Four Seasons would greatly expand the arena's ability to host money-making events.

The ice rink issue was never adequately resolved. In March 2003, the county's insurance carrier said it would allow the arena to keep the practice rink open for another 60 days. Two weeks later, the county proposed keeping the main rink open only from mid-May to mid-June and from mid-August to mid-September, and closing the practice ice permanently. The cooling system under the practice ice failed the first week of April 2003, and the county hired a refrigeration specialist from Canada to determine whether it could be repaired. The consultant estimated the cost of repairs at $450,000, money the county did not have. The practice ice closed permanently. The loss of the practice ice and limited hours of use given for the main ice led the Great Falls Americans junior league hockey team to move to Fargo, North Dakota in April 2003. With the semi-closure of the main ice, Four Seasons Arena began seeking other events to make money. In May 2003, it signed an agreement with the Class C Northern Division high school athletic league to "permanently" host District 7, 8, 9, and 10 boys' and girls' basketball tournaments. In December 2003, Four Seasons Arena spent $9,000 remodeling the old practice ice space (now known as "Side 2"). The space was made handicapped-accessible, the floor was fixed, electrical improvements made, the dashers removed, a concessions stand built, and large-screen video monitors installed. The space was turned into a viewing area, and rented out to a local rodeo organization so that fans could watch live rodeo broadcasts (an event which quickly sold out). "Sparky," a mechanical bull used for riding and roping training, was also placed in Side 2. In January 2005, SMG announced it would provide ice in the main rink only in September and October. Although this was later expanded to include November, blocks of ice-time were so discontinuous that no hockey or figure skating events were scheduled for Four Seasons Arena that year. When the All-American Professional Basketball League announced it was forming and intended to award Great Falls a franchise, SMG said it would stop offering ice events in the main arena permanently. But the league collapsed just days after it began operations in September 2005, SMG said it would offer more ice time. SMG managers estimated they would lose $30,000 in revenues by adding more ice time.

Cascade County renewed its contract with SMG in 2007. The new two-year contract paid SMG $84,413 a year (about $4,000 less than the 2002 contract), and included a payment of 15% of operating revenues of all income over $2.5 million. SMG also received 7.5% of all concessions sales (down from 10% in the old contract). Cascade County also agreed to subsidize the fairgrounds and Four Seasons Arena by $750,000 a year, and pay the wages of all SMG employees operating the facilities. But in 2009, Cascade County declined to renew SMG's contract, concluding it had learned enough to manage the fairgrounds and arena on its own.

In 2009, Four Seasons installed air conditioning for the first time in its history. The following year, the county loaned $400,000 to the arena to pay for the replacement of about a quarter of the permanent bleachers, upgrading and refurbishment of the remaining permanent bleachers, and replacement of the two sets of temporary bleachers. The same year, the flooring in the concessions area was cleaned and sealed and the carpeting replaced, and the "green room" in the arena refurbished.

== Possible renovations ==
A major study by Cascade County and Montana ExpoPark in 2010 proposed making significant changes to the fairgrounds and Four Seasons Arena. The study, conducted by Markin Consulting, disclosed that the race track grandstand's concrete foundation was crumbling, the livestock pavilion's sheet metal walls were rusting, the horse barns were poorly ventilated and lit, and Four Seasons Arena suffered from poor acoustics and limited seating. The report outlined a number of options, including spending $7 million to $9 million to replace the grandstand, spending another $35 million to build a larger arena, and paying $12.6 million to demolish all existing horse barns and service facilities and build a 2,000-to-3,000 seat track just for horse racing.

Less radical solutions also existed. Four Seasons Arena could be converted into an exhibition hall, and the current Exhibition Hall transformed into a banquet hall, at a cost of $2 million. The report said an alternative to the demolition of all existing equestrian facilities would be to construct a new 300-stall horse barn.

The study did not advocate construction of a large facility like Rimrock Auto Arena at MetraPark in Billings.

The same month, however, a private group announced it intended to build a new $40 million 6,000-seat indoor sports arena south of the city. The first phase of the project would be a two-story, 86,300-square-foot (8,020 m^{2}) training facility that would include two side-by-side indoor soccer fields (configurable as an indoor softball field) with retractable seating for 500, a hardwood indoor basketball/volleyball court with mezzanine seating for 240, a wrestling area with three full-size mats and seating for 240, an indoor 40-metre (130 ft) sprint track, two locker rooms, a classroom, a concessions area, and an urgent care area. The second story would contain space which would leased by Mountain View Physical Therapy (a for-profit health care provider). The second phase of the project would be a 150,000-square-foot (14,000 m^{2}) multi-purpose arena capable of seating 6,000 and hosting a full-size football field (reconfigurable for rodeos and soccer). The plan also envisions two outdoor practice soccer fields, an outdoor practice softball/baseball field, and a small hotel (to be built by another, future investor). The architect for the project is L'Heureux Page Werner. Organizers said they had already secured a 19-acre (7.7 ha) site two blocks south of the Montana State University College of Technology – Great Falls, and intended to begin construction on the $10 million "phase one" building in the summer of 2011. In April 2011, the backers of the proposed facility received a favorable reception from Montana Governor Brian Schweitzer (although no funds were allocated or appropriate yet). The Internal Revenue Service approved Mountain View Sports Complex's application for nonprofit status in early June 2011.

== Events at Four Seasons ==
=== Professional sports ===
The arena housed the Great Falls Americans of the Western Hockey League during that professional team's only season (1979). The team folded in mid-season in December 1979. From 1979 to 2003, Four Seasons Arena was the home rink of the Great Falls Americans junior league hockey team. The CBA awarded the Great Falls Explorers franchise to the city in 2006, and the team played at Four Seasons Arena until it folded in 2008. (The arena was forced to sue to collect $12,000 in back rent.)

=== "Firsts" and special events at Four Seasons ===
Over the years, the Four Seasons Arena has hosted a number of special events. In January 1989, Great Falls native and Olympic boxer Todd Foster made his professional boxing debut at the arena. Foster fought again there in October 1991. Rock music legend Bob Dylan played there on July 26, 2005. The first MayFaire, an annual arts and music event benefitting the Benefis Health System, held its first-ever concert at Four Seasons Arena in 2006 (featuring country-western singer Trisha Yearwood). In 2007, for the first time in its history, the city of Great Falls consolidated all its polling places into a single site: Four Seasons Arena Exhibition Hall. In March 2011, the arena hosted the city's first-ever mixed martial arts event, featuring Great Falls natives Leo Bercier, Frank Ramsey, and Tim Welch.

The President of the United States or a future President has spoken at Four Seasons Arena three times. On February 3, 2005, President George W. Bush spoke there the day after his State of the Union address to promote his plan to privatize Social Security. On May 30, 2008, presidential candidate Barack Obama spoke at Four Seasons Arena. President Donald Trump spoke at the arena on July 5, 2018.

=== High school basketball play ===
Four Seasons Arena has been the site of a number of high school athletic events. It hosted the Montana Class AA boys' basketball tournament in 2001 and 2003, and the Class AA boys' and girls' combined basketball tournament in 2006 and 2008. It will host the Class AA boys' and girls' combined basketball tournament again in 2013. It also played host to the Class A boys' basketball tournament in 2010. Four Seasons Arena was the site for the Montana Class B boys' basketball tournament in 1989, 1996, 1998, 2000, 2002, 2006. and 2010.

Four Seasons has also held a number of Class C basketball tourneys. In Montana, Class C athletics have a complex structure due to the large number of schools and the extensive geographic distances involved. Class C play is organized into divisions, with each division having two or more districts: Eastern Division (districts 2 and 3), Southern Division (districts 4 and 6), Northern Division (districts 7, 8, 9, and 10), and Western Division (districts 11/12, 13, and 14). Each district (which contains six to 11 schools) holds a district tournament, sending two or four winners (depending on the number of schools in the district) to the divisional tournament. Each division holds a divisional tournament, sending two teams to the state tourney. Great Falls is located geographically in the Class C Northern Division. Four Seasons Arena hosted the Class C state boys' basketball tournament in 1999. In 2005, it hosted the first-ever combined Northern Division Class C boys' basketball tournament in Montana history (in which all four Northern Division district tourneys were held simultaneously). It hosted the combined Northern Class C boys' and girls' basketball tournaments in 2008 and again in 2009. In 2010, Four Seasons was the site of the Class C girls' state basketball tournament—the first time the Class C state tourney had been held in the city. The arena will host the Class C girls' state tournament again in 2012, as well as the Class C boys' Northern Division combined district basketball playoffs.

=== Other notable sporting events ===
Rodeo events are often held at Four Seasons. The Montana Pro Rodeo Finals have been held there every year since 1980. The arena also hosted the first-ever World Professional Bull Riding Finals in 1999, and again in 2000.

The arena hosted the annual Terry Casey Memorial Cup national high school hockey tournament in 2000 and 2006. It did so again in 2008, restoring ice in the main rink for the first time in several years after the city's new ice hockey venue, the Central Montana IcePlex, did not open in time.

In 2006, for the first time ever, Four Seasons hosted the Northern Native American Classic, an annual basketball tournament for high schools in the northern U.S. with a Native American-majority student body. In 2008, the National Cutting Horse Association held an eight-day cutting horse competition (where riders guide horses orally, rather than with bit and bridle, in order to corral cattle) at the arena.

=== Other annual events ===
A number of other large events are also held at Four Seasons Arena on an annual basis.

The Montana Agricultural Industrial Exhibit (MAGIE) is also held at Four Seasons. The farm and ranch trade show draws exhibitors and attendees from Montana, Idaho, North Dakota, Oregon, South Dakota, Washington, Wyoming, and Canada, and is Montana's largest trade show. It began holding its annual event in the arena in 2000, and as of 2011 has held it there every year since (with the exception of 2006). In 2000, the arena hosted the first-ever joint meeting of the Montana Grain Growers Association and Montana Stockgrowers Association.

Beginning in 1999, the arena also hosted portions of Western Art Week. Beginning in 2002, the Great Falls Gun and Antique Show was also held annually at the arena. The same year, the Electric City Kennel Club began holding its annual dog show at Four Seasons.

In 2005, the What Women Want Expo moved to the Four Seasons as well. Founded in 2003, the event proved so popular that only the Four Seasons Arena could accommodate the exhibitors and crowds.

== Facilities ==
Four Seasons Arena is a concrete and steel structure. The exterior is painted unfinished concrete. The interior walls are unfinished concrete, to which sound-absorbent acoustical panels (made of fabric-covered wood) are attached. The floor is finished, polished concrete. The interior ceiling consists of exposed painted steel beams.

The main hall at Four Seasons Arena is a rectangular space 141 by 222 feet (43 by 68 m), for a total area of 33,000 square feet (3,100 m^{2}). The Side 2 room is a rectangular space 80 by 222 feet (24 by 68 m), for a total area of 17,000 square feet (1,600 m^{2}). In both rooms, clearance is 28 feet (8.5 m). The arena has nine dressing rooms with showers, several hospitality/service rooms, and an office (available for client use). The Exhibition Hall is a rectangular space 220 by 80 feet (67 by 24 m), for a total area of 15,000 square feet (1,400 m^{2}). It is at a right-angle to the arena itself, and is connected to it by a hallway, dressing rooms, offices, and restroom facilities. With offices, restrooms, and other space, the Four Seasons Arena has a total of 53,000 square feet (4,900 m^{2}). The wall between the main room and Side 2 is often removed to achieve a larger space.

Four Seasons has permanent banks of bleachers in front of the east and west walls, and in a balcony above the north wall. The permanent configuration leaves about 25 feet (7.6 m) of space between the west bleachers and the wall, and about 35 feet (11 m) of space between the east bleachers and the wall. Temporary bleachers can be set up behind the east and west permanent bleachers, in front of the north side balcony, and against the south wall to expand the seating. Additionally, chairs may be set theater-style on the floor of the arena during concerts to achieve seating capacity.

== Foundation ==
Four Seasons Arena is supported by the Four Seasons Sports Foundation. The nonprofit, private foundation raises money to help pay for the cost of bidding on sporting events at Four Seasons Arena. Roughly half the cost of the bid is paid for by the arena, with the other half paid for by the foundation. In September 2011, the foundation selected George Geise as chairman of its newly formed outreach committee. For 33 years the sports writer for the local Great Falls Tribune newspaper, Geise said he was charged with working more closely with local businesses, the foundation, the Tourism Business Improvement District, and sports groups around the state to find ways to make bids by Four Seasons Arena even more attractive to organizations seeking a sporting venue.

== Bibliography ==
- Merrill-Maker, Andrea. Montana Almanac. Guilford, Conn.: Insiders' Guide, 2006.
