= Norma Ashby =

American journalist

Norma Beatty Ashby
- Born: Norma Rae Beatty; December 27, 1935 (age 90); Helena, Montana, U.S.
- Education: Degree from University of Montana
- Occupation: Television journalist
- Years active: 1962-1988
- Notable credit: Today in Montana
- Spouse: Shirley Carter Ashby

Norma Rae Beatty Ashby (born December 27, 1935) is a former journalist and a co-host for 26 years of Today in Montana, which aired live on KRTV in Great Falls, Montana. Her career with the station began in February 1962, and she was inducted into the Montana Broadcaster's Hall of Fame in 2010 A fourth-generation Montanan, she produced more than 21 television documentaries and interviewed over 26,000 individuals, including a number of nationally known musicians, celebrities and political figures, including Bob Hope, Clint Eastwood, and Pat Nixon.

== Early life ==
Born in Helena, Montana, Ashby was a 4th-generation Montanan and she grew up on a ranch near Winston. Her mother was Ella Mehmke. During high school in Helena, Montana she interviewed Audie Murphy, actor and World War II hero. She obtained a journalism degree from the University of Montana and first worked as a researcher for Life magazine. She returned to Montana in 1961 and married her husband, Shirley Carter Ashby, in 1964. They adopted two children, Ann and Tony, in 1972.

== Television career ==
Ashby began working for KRTV in Great Falls in 1962. KRTV had only been in operation since 1958. She was interviewed for the job on February 14, 1962, got the position, and the first edition of Today in Montana aired February 19. The first broadcasts of the show were conducted in a metal Quonset hut. On most of the shows until 1968 she was a co-host with owner Dan Snyder, who sold the station that year. She had various other co-hosts thereafter.

Over her time on Today in Montana, Ashby hosted about 260 shows a year and interviewed over 26,000 people. Political figures she interviewed included nationally known individuals such as Margaret Chase Smith in 1964, and first lady Pat Nixon in 1974. She also met, but did not have an opportunity to interview, Presidents John F. Kennedy and Ronald Reagan. She often took the opportunity to interview national media figures including Chet Huntley, whom she convinced to narrate a documentary about Helena that she had written, and she appeared with Jane Pauley on the Today Show.

Hollywood celebrities she interviewed included: Joan Crawford, Clint Eastwood, Olivia de Havilland, Bob Hope, Art Linkletter, and Vincent Price. Bob Hope was her favorite interviewee, though she was also kissed by Robert Goulet when she interviewed him at the Ambassador Hotel in Los Angeles. She interviewed many musicians when they were in Great Falls as headliners at the Montana State Fair, and some of these included Johnny Cash and Charley Pride. Other major public figures she interviewed included Abigail Van Buren, Mary Kay Ash, and local favorite Evel Knievel, a Butte native and nationally known motorcycle daredevil.

However, one of the more notable live programs in her own recollection included a segment where a rancher gutted a live rattlesnake on the air, resulting in dozens of live baby rattlesnakes spilling out onto the set.

== Activities and recognition ==
Ashby was active in broadcasting, civic and charitable activities both before and after her retirement from Today in Montana. She was a co-host of the Montana Children's Miracle Network Telethon, and wrote a memoir, Movie Stars & Rattlesnakes: The Heyday of Montana Live Television, published in 2004. She became a board member of the Greater Montana Foundation in 2008. She produced 22 television documentaries, most recently in 2009. Ashby was inducted into the Montana Broadcaster's Hall of Fame in 2010; the first living woman and second woman ever to be so honored.

Ashby's civic involvement was notable; she was instrumental in founding the C.M. Russell Art Auction, which began in 1969 as a benefit for the C. M. Russell Museum Complex. When she discovered Montana had no state fish, she initiated a drive on Today in Montana to have one selected, resulting in an informal citizen's election and a win for the cutthroat trout after hot competition from the Arctic grayling. The legislature in turn adopted this recommendation by a wide margin. Over the course of her career, she was named the Most Influential Woman in Great Falls and was TV Broadcaster of the Year in 1985. She was made an honorary member of the Blackfeet Tribe and won the Distinguished Alumni Award from the University of Montana.

== Sources ==
- Ashby, Norma Beatty (2004). Movie Stars & Rattlesnakes: The Heyday of Montana Live Television. Helena, MT: Farcountry Press. ISBN 1-56037-366-0.
- "State Fish Blackspotted Cutthroat Trout". Montana Department of Tourism. 2007.
- "State Fish, Montana Code Annotated: 1-1-507". Montana Legislative Services. 2011. Archived from the original on January 17, 2013.
