= Great Falls Americans (AWHL) =

- City: Great Falls, Montana
- League: American Frontier Hockey League
- Operated: 1995–2003
- Home arena: Four Seasons Arena

The Great Falls Americans were a junior ice hockey team based in Great Falls, Montana playing in the American Frontier Hockey League and the America West Hockey League from 1995 to 2003. They played at the Four Seasons Arena. The team won the league championship in 2000-2001. Notable players during the 2000-2001 AWHL hockey season include Pat Dwyer, Bobby Robins, Jon Volp, and David Printz. During this successful season, under the coaching of Swedish born Rikard Grönborg, the Americans won the AWHL championship, beating the Billings Bulls for the trophy.

== Season-by-season record ==
Season statistics
Note: GP = Games played, W = Wins, L = Losses, T = Ties Pts = Points,
GF = Goals for, GA = Goals against

Season	GP	W	L	T	GF	GA	Points	Finish
1999–00	58	33	17	0	217	97	74	2nd
2000–01	60	42	11	0	289	168	91	1st
