= Montana Golden Nuggets =

- Leagues: CBA
- Founded: 1980
- Folded: 1983
- Location: Great Falls, Montana
- Team colors: Gold, Brown, White
- Head coach: George Karl
- Conference titles: 2 1981, 1983

The Montana Golden Nuggets are a former Continental Basketball Association (CBA) team that played from 1980 to 1983.

Montana reached the CBA finals in 1981 and 1983, with George Karl earning Coach of the Year honors both seasons. Karl's 1980-81 team, led by John Douglas, Phil Taylor, Willie Smith and Geoff Crompton, went 27–15. The Nuggets met a high scoring Rochester team in the championship, where they were swept, four games to none.

The club went 30–16 the next season with a roster featuring Ronnie Valentine, Walter Jordan, U.S. Reed, Robert Smith, Kenny Dennard and Terry Stotts, but lost in the conference finals to in-state rival the Billings Volcanos. A return to the championship marked the 1983 season, the team's last. Montana lost to Detroit in the league finals, four games to three. In late 2006, the "Electric City" saw the return of the CBA in the form of the Great Falls Explorers.

== Season by season record ==
Season	GP	W	L	Pct.	QW	Points	Finish	Playoffs
1980–81	42	27	15	.643	—	—	1^{st} CBA Western Division	Lost CBA Finals to the Rochester Zeniths (0–4)
1981–82	46	30	16	.652	104	194	2^{nd} CBA Western Division	—
1982–83	44	33	11	.750	104	203	1^{st} CBA Western Division	Lost CBA Finals to the Detroit Spirits (3–4)

== See also ==
- Billings RimRockers
- Butte Daredevils
- Great Falls Explorers
