= Olaf C. Seltzer =

American painter and illustrator

Olaf Carl Seltzer
- Born: August 27, 1877; Copenhagen, Denmark
- Died: December 16, 1957 (aged 80); Great Falls, Montana, U.S.
- Occupations: Painter, illustrator
- Spouse: Mabel L. Cleeland
- Children: 2 sons

Olaf C. Seltzer (August 27, 1877 - December 16, 1957) was a Danish-born American painter and illustrator from Great Falls, Montana. He did over 2,500 paintings and illustrations of the American West, including cowboys. Notably, President Harry Truman received one of his paintings as a gift on his 1950 visit to Montana.

== Early life ==
Seltzer was born on August 27, 1877, in Copenhagen, Denmark. He emigrated to the United States with his mother after his father died, and settled in Great Falls, where his uncle lived. He did not speak English when he arrived.

== Career ==
Seltzer worked as a machinist for the Great Northern Railway. In 1897, he began painting alongside Charles M. Russell. Seltzer decided to paint independently from 1921 onward. He worked as an illustrator for The New York Tribune in 1934, and he exhibited his work in Seattle in 1936. He did 275 paintings for physician Philip G. Cole. He did over 2,500 paintings and illustrations over the course of his career.

Seltzer did both watercolor and oil paintings, and he depicted life in the American West, including animals, cowboys and historical events. He also painted pioneers like Meriwether Lewis and William Clark. Seltzer did a painting for the Grand Masonic Library in Helena. President Harry Truman received one of his paintings as a gift on his 1950 visit to Montana. His work was exhibited at the Gilcrease Museum in Oklahoma in 1957.

== Personal life, death and legacy ==
Seltzer married Mabel L. Cleeland in 1903. They had two sons, Carl and Walter, and they resided in Great Falls.

Seltzer died on December 16, 1957, in Great Falls, Montana. Some of his work is in the permanent collection of the C. M. Russell Museum Complex in Great Falls, the Art Institute of Chicago, the Gilcrease Museum in Oklahoma, and the Tacoma Art Museum in Tacoma, Washington. His papers are at the Smithsonian Institution's Archives of American Art.

His grandson, Steve Seltzer, is a painter.

== Works ==
- Kennedy, Michael S. (1960). The Life and Times of Olaf C. Seltzer, 1877 to 1957: Meticulous Montana Frontier Artist. Helena, Montana: Historical Society of Montana. OCLC 22900958.
