= Bobby Robins =

American ice hockey player

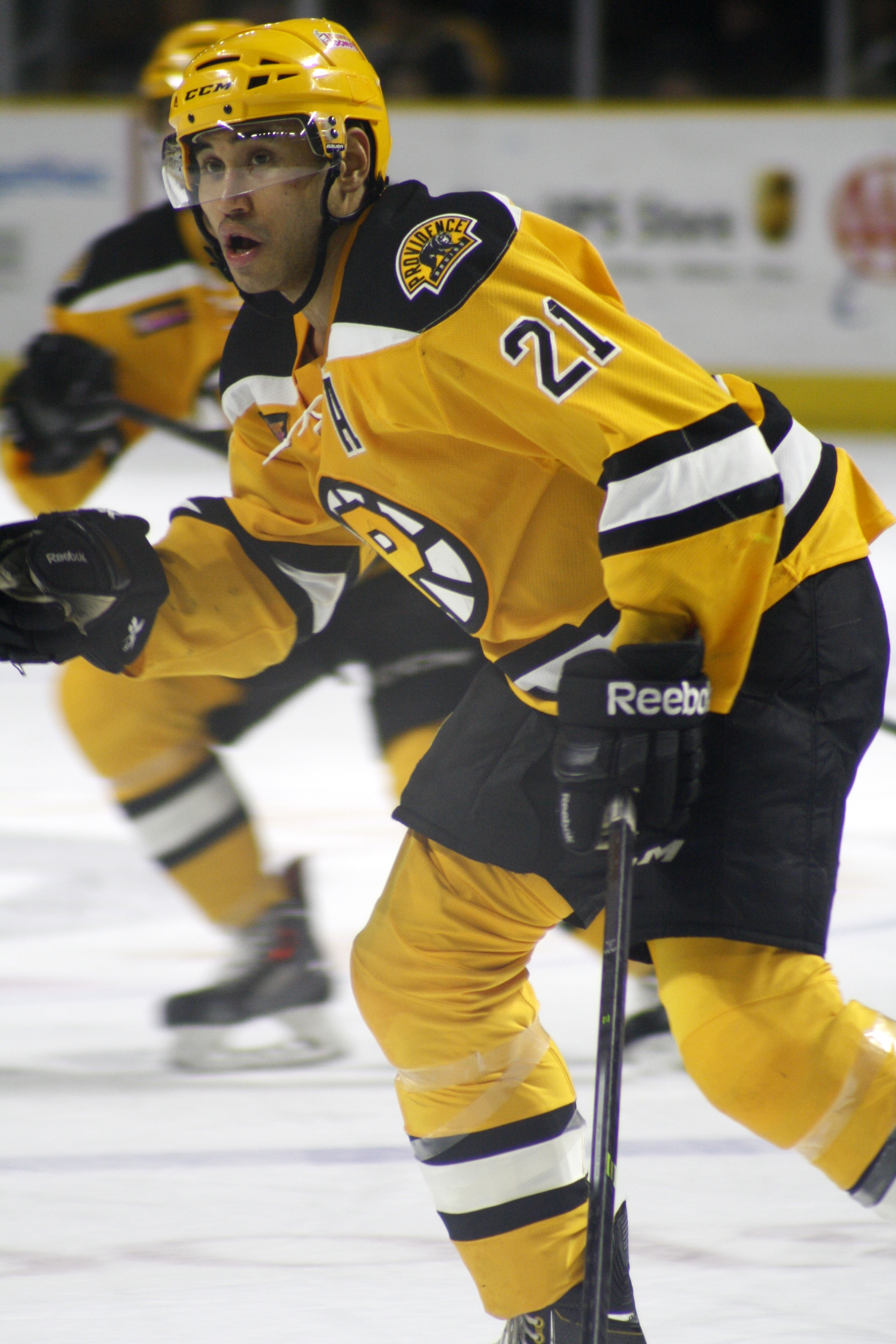
- Robins with the Providence Bruins in 2014
- Born: October 17, 1981 (age 44) Peshtigo, Wisconsin, U.S.
- Height: 6 ft 1 in (185 cm)
- Weight: 220 lb (100 kg; 15 st 10 lb)
- Position: Right wing
- Shot: Right
- Played for: Belfast Giants; HK Acroni Jesenice; Boston Bruins
- NHL draft: Undrafted
- Playing career: 2006–2015

Robert Raymond Robins (born October 17, 1981) is a former American professional ice hockey forward. He played for the Boston Bruins in the National Hockey League (NHL).

== Playing career ==
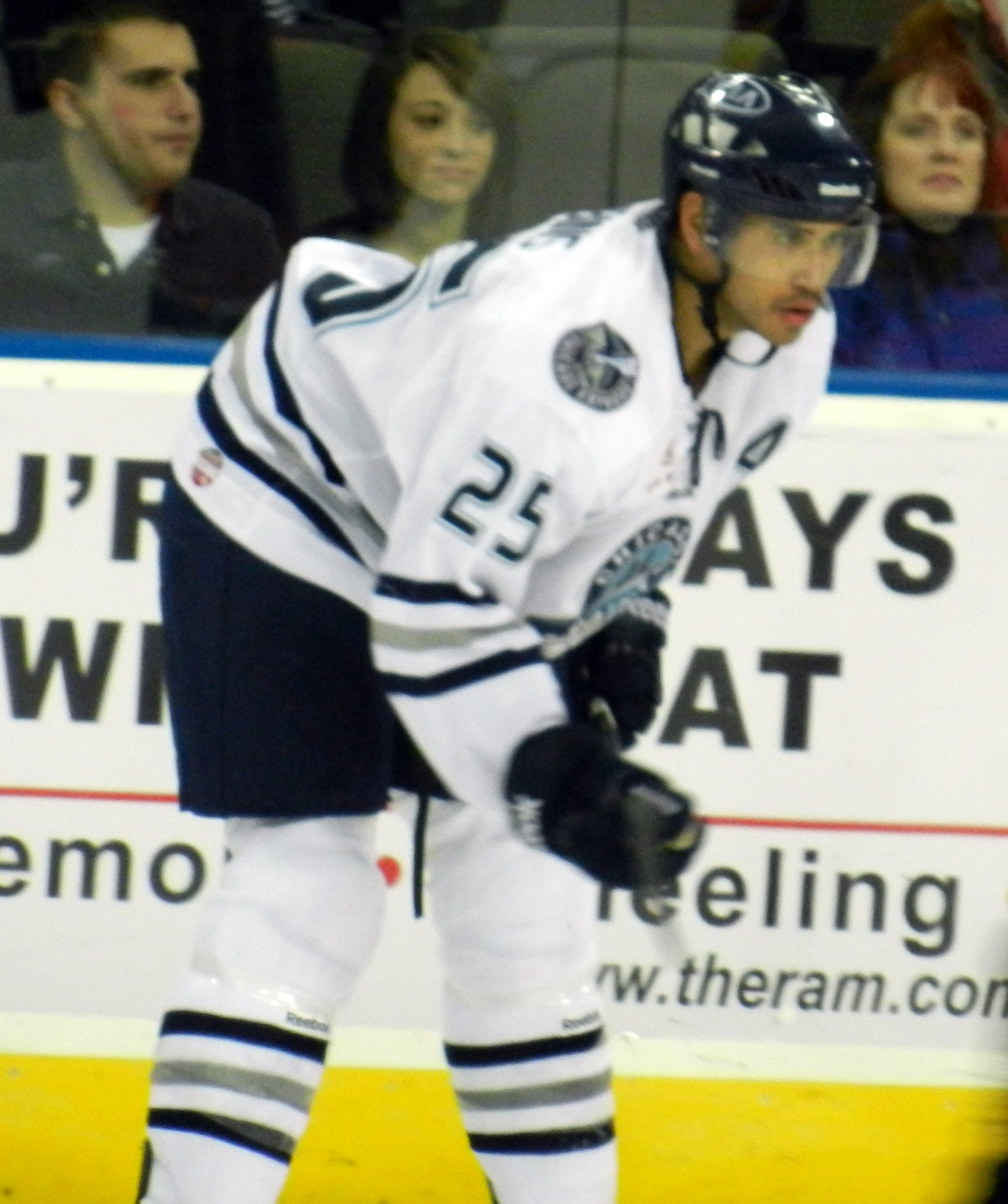
Robins playing for the Chicago Express in 2011.

Robins spent four seasons of Division 1 collegiate hockey at the University of Massachusetts Lowell before signing an NHL contract with the Ottawa Senators in 2006. He was assigned to the Binghamton Senators of the American Hockey League and spent two seasons there. He then was assigned to the ECHL with the Elmira Jackals and also had short spells with the Rochester Americans, Albany River Rats and the Syracuse Crunch of the American Hockey League. In 2008, Robins headed to Europe and signed with the Belfast Giants of the Elite Ice Hockey League in the United Kingdom.

Robins signed with the Rødovre Mighty Bulls of the AL-Bank Ligaen Danish Hockey League for the 2009–10 season but the contract was annulled due to financial difficulties with Rødovre. Robins then signed with HK Acroni Jesenice in the Austrian Hockey League and finished the season there.

Robins returned to the United States for the 2010–11 hockey season to play with the Bakersfield Condors of the ECHL. On September 22, 2011, the Condors traded Robins to the Chicago Express in exchange for future considerations. He was then loaned to the AHL's Abbotsford Heat and Providence Bruins and eventually signed a contract with the Bruins for the remainder of the 2011-2012 season.

Robins signed an American Hockey League contract with the Providence Bruins for the 2012-13 season. On July 5, 2013, he signed a two-year, two-way NHL contract by the Boston Bruins.

During the 2014-2015 season, the second year of his contract with the Bruins, Robins made his NHL debut on October 8, 2014, against the Philadelphia Flyers, and had his first NHL fight against Flyers defenseman Luke Schenn. After three games, Robins was waived for the purpose of reassignment to the Providence Bruins of the American Hockey League.

Robins announced his retirement due to concussion on July 9, 2015.

== Personal ==
Robins runs and writes a blog at www.bobbyrobins.com. His mother is part Filipino and his father is an American of European descent.

== Career statistics ==
			Regular season					Playoffs
Season	Team	League	GP	G	A	Pts	PIM	GP	G	A	Pts	PIM
2000–01	Great Falls Americans	AWHL	59	22	22	44	151	—	—	—	—	—
2001–02	Tri-City Storm	USHL	60	16	14	30	176	—	—	—	—	—
2002–03	UMass Lowell	HE	26	5	3	8	24	—	—	—	—	—
2003–04	UMass Lowell	HE	32	5	7	12	49	—	—	—	—	—
2004–05	UMass Lowell	HE	34	9	9	18	86	—	—	—	—	—
2005–06	UMass Lowell	HE	35	13	18	31	94	—	—	—	—	—
2005–06	Binghamton Senators	AHL	16	4	3	7	19	—	—	—	—	—
2006–07	Binghamton Senators	AHL	80	7	8	15	110	—	—	—	—	—
2007–08	Elmira Jackals	ECHL	68	18	17	35	151	6	2	3	5	8
2007–08	Rochester Americans	AHL	5	0	0	0	13	—	—	—	—	—
2007–08	Albany River Rats	AHL	1	0	0	0	0	—	—	—	—	—
2007–08	Syracuse Crunch	AHL	1	0	0	0	2	—	—	—	—	—
2008–09	Belfast Giants	EIHL	43	21	25	46	79	2	1	0	1	4
2009–10	HK Acroni Jesenice	EBEL	34	3	4	7	178	—	—	—	—	—
2010–11	Bakersfield Condors	ECHL	46	14	13	27	186	4	0	1	1	11
2011–12	Chicago Express	ECHL	28	7	8	15	123	—	—	—	—	—
2011–12	Abbotsford Heat	AHL	2	0	0	0	0	—	—	—	—	—
2011–12	Providence Bruins	AHL	33	2	10	12	150	—	—	—	—	—
2012–13	Providence Bruins	AHL	74	4	7	11	316	12	1	1	2	69
2013–14	Providence Bruins	AHL	68	5	9	14	221	9	1	0	1	30
2014–15	Boston Bruins	NHL	3	0	0	0	14	—	—	—	—	—
2014–15	Providence Bruins	AHL	2	0	0	0	2	—	—	—	—	—
AHL totals			282	22	37	59	833	21	2	1	3	99
NHL totals			3	0	0	0	14	—	—	—	—	—
