= Steve Aggers =

American basketball coach (born 1948)

Biographical details
- Born: May 31, 1948 (age 78); Laramie, Wyoming, U.S.

Playing career
- 1966–1968: Mid-Plains CC
- 1968–1970: Chadron State

Coaching career (HC unless noted)
- 1974–1978: Mid-Plains CC
- 1978–1979: Wyoming (assistant)
- 1979–1985: Great Falls
- 1985–1990: Wayne State (NE)
- 1990–1994: Pepperdine (assistant)
- 1994–1995: Kansas State (assistant)
- 1995–2000: Eastern Washington
- 2000–2005: Loyola Marymount
- 2006–2007: Great Falls Explorers

Accomplishments and honors

Championships
- Big Sky regular season (2000)

Awards
- 2× Big Sky Coach of the Year (1998, 2000)

Steve Aggers (born May 31, 1948) is an American retired college basketball coach. He is best known for his tenures as head coach of NCAA Division I programs at Eastern Washington and Loyola Marymount.

Aggers was hired as head coach at Eastern Washington after assistant coaching stints at Pepperdine and Kansas State under Tom Asbury. He had previously been head coach at Wayne State in Nebraska and the University of Great Falls. He led the Eagles to their first Big Sky Conference title in school history in 2000.

He was hired as head coach at Loyola Marymount University in 2000. He was fired in 2005 after an 11–17 season in 2004–05.

In 2006, Aggers was hired as head coach of the Great Falls Explorers of the Continental Basketball Association (CBA).
