= Patrick Dwyer (ice hockey) =

American ice hockey player (born 1983)

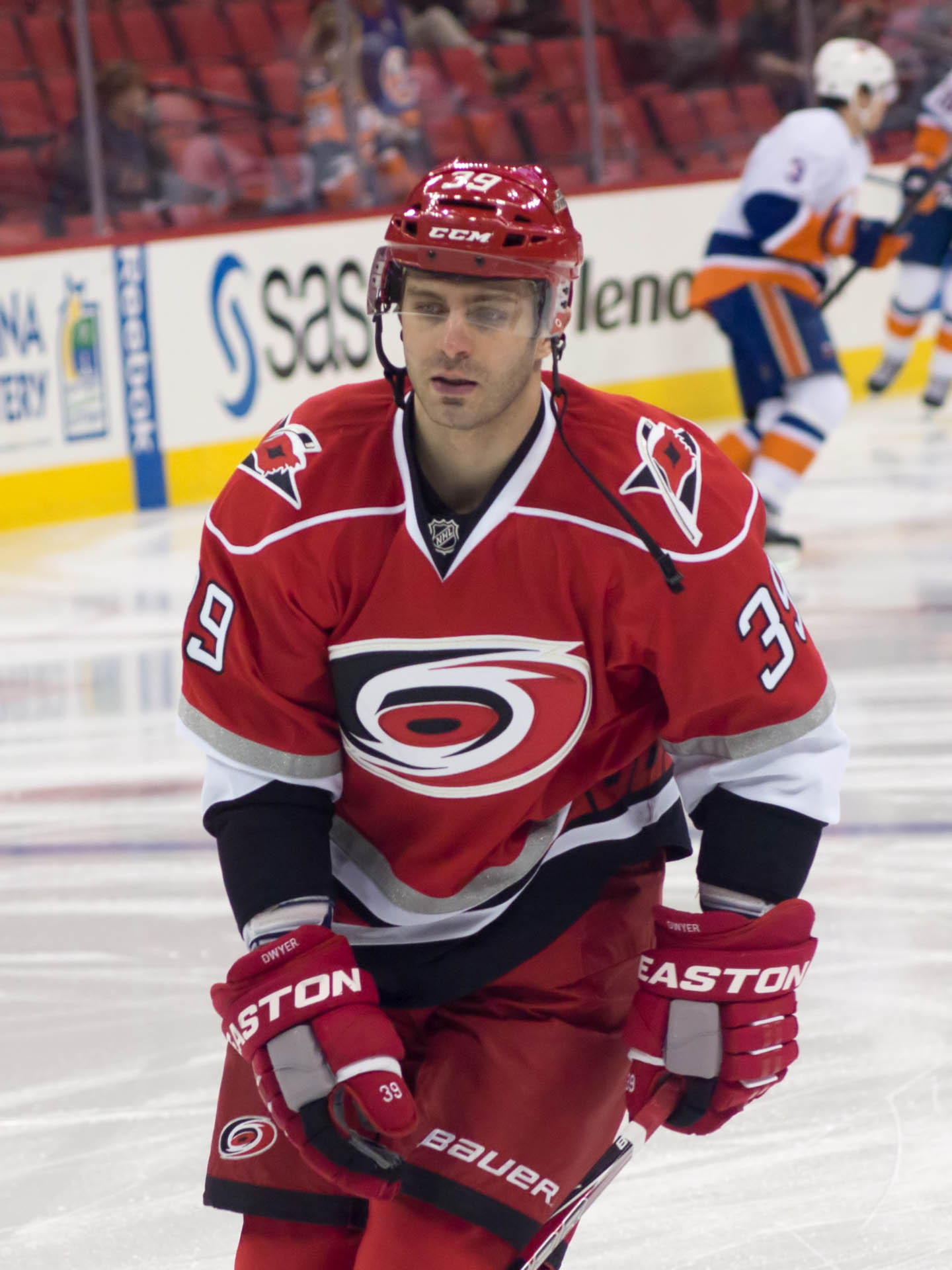
- Born: June 22, 1983 (age 43) Spokane, Washington, U.S.
- Height: 5 ft 11 in (180 cm)
- Weight: 185 lb (84 kg; 13 st 3 lb)
- Position: Right wing
- Shot: Right
- Played for: Carolina Hurricanes; Modo Hockey; SønderjyskE; Belfast Giants
- National team: United States
- NHL draft: 116th overall, 2002; Atlanta Thrashers
- Playing career: 2005–2019

Patrick "Pat" Dwyer (born June 22, 1983) is an American former professional ice hockey right winger who played in the National Hockey League with the Carolina Hurricanes. He was originally selected by the Atlanta Thrashers in the fourth round, 116th overall, of the 2002 NHL entry draft.

He is currently an assistant coach for the Minnesota Wild of the National Hockey League.

== Playing career ==
After 9 seasons within the Carolina Hurricanes organization, Dwyer left the club having played in 416 regular season games as a free agent. Dwyer was unable to attain an NHL contract over the summer and on September 19, 2015, accepted a try-out offer to attend the Arizona Coyotes training camp. At the conclusion of training camp, Dwyer was released from his try-out contract with the Coyotes. With the 2015–16 season underway, Dwyer belatedly signed a contract abroad in Sweden for the remainder of the campaign with Modo Hockey of the SHL on October 22, 2015. Adding depth in a checking line role, Dwyer was unable to contribute offensively, producing just 7 assists in 33 games as Modo were relegated to the HockeyAllsvenskan.

As a free agent over the summer, Dwyer returned to North America and agreed to an invitation to attend the Columbus Blue Jackets training camp on a professional try-out on September 21, 2016. Upon his release from the Blue Jackets, Dwyer returned to the Hurricanes fold in preparation for the 2016–17 season, signing a one-year AHL contract with affiliate, the Charlotte Checkers on October 11, 2016.

After a spell in Denmark, Dwyer moved to the UK to sign for the Belfast Giants on 26 July 2018. In his last professional season in 2018–19, Dwyer added a veteran and dominating scoring presence to the Giants, posting 25 goals and 61 points in 38 games. While also serving in a player-assistant coach role, Dwyer was named to the EIHL Second All-Star Team and captured the EIHL championship.

== Coaching career ==
Having served as an assistant coach during his last playing season with the Belfast Giants, Dwyer returned to North America following his retirement and re-joined the Carolina Hurricanes organization in accepting an assistant coaching role with former club, the Charlotte Checkers of the AHL, on July 30, 2019. In 2020, he was named an assistant coach with the Hurricanes' new AHL affiliate, the Chicago Wolves.

On July 5, 2023, Dwyer was named assistant coach to Minnesota Wild AHL affiliate, the Iowa Wild. On November 28, 2023, following the firing of previous assistant coach Bob Woods, Dwyer was named an assistant coach with the Minnesota Wild.

== Personal life ==
Dwyer was born in Spokane, Washington and raised in Great Falls, Montana

== Career statistics ==
=== Regular season and playoffs ===
			Regular season					Playoffs
Season	Team	League	GP	G	A	Pts	PIM	GP	G	A	Pts	PIM
1999–00	Great Falls Americans	AWHL	38	5	9	14	35	—	—	—	—	—
2000–01	Great Falls Americans	AWHL	49	33	57	90	106	—	—	—	—	—
2001–02	Western Michigan University	CCHA	38	17	17	34	26	—	—	—	—	—
2002–03	Western Michigan University	CCHA	33	9	10	19	20	—	—	—	—	—
2003–04	Western Michigan University	CCHA	35	13	13	26	22	—	—	—	—	—
2004–05	Western Michigan University	CCHA	36	6	16	22	56	—	—	—	—	—
2004–05	Gwinnett Gladiators	ECHL	14	0	5	5	8	2	0	1	1	0
2005–06	Chicago Wolves	AHL	73	16	29	45	49	—	—	—	—	—
2006–07	Albany River Rats	AHL	79	16	25	41	39	5	0	1	1	5
2007–08	Albany River Rats	AHL	59	13	12	25	29	7	0	2	2	0
2008–09	Albany River Rats	AHL	62	24	16	40	29	—	—	—	—	—
2008–09	Carolina Hurricanes	NHL	13	1	0	1	0	2	0	1	1	0
2009–10	Carolina Hurricanes	NHL	58	7	5	12	6	—	—	—	—	—
2009–10	Albany River Rats	AHL	23	11	8	19	6	—	—	—	—	—
2010–11	Carolina Hurricanes	NHL	80	8	10	18	12	—	—	—	—	—
2011–12	Carolina Hurricanes	NHL	73	5	7	12	23	—	—	—	—	—
2012–13	Carolina Hurricanes	NHL	46	8	8	16	12	—	—	—	—	—
2013–14	Carolina Hurricanes	NHL	75	8	14	22	14	—	—	—	—	—
2014–15	Carolina Hurricanes	NHL	71	5	7	12	10	—	—	—	—	—
2015–16	Modo Hockey	SHL	33	0	7	7	6	—	—	—	—	—
2016–17	Charlotte Checkers	AHL	58	14	12	26	20	5	0	0	0	0
2017–18	SønderjyskE Ishockey	DEN	26	10	12	22	8	7	6	0	6	0
2018–19	Belfast Giants	EIHL	38	25	36	61	12	4	1	2	3	2
AHL totals			354	94	102	196	172	17	0	3	3	5
NHL totals			416	42	51	93	77	2	0	1	1	0

=== International ===
Year	Team	Event	Result	GP	G	A	Pts	PIM
2012	United States	WC	7th	8	1	2	3	0
Senior totals				8	1	2	3	0

== Awards and honors ==
Award	Year
College
All-CCHA Rookie Team	2002
CCHA Rookie of the Year	2002
EIHL
Second all-star team	2019
EIHL Champion (Belfast Giants)	2019

Awards and achievements
Preceded by R. J. Umberger	CCHA Rookie of the Year; 2001–02	Succeeded by Jeff Tambellini
