= Great Falls Explorers =

- League: CBA; 2006–2008
- Founded: 2006; 20 years ago
- Folded: 2008; 18 years ago
- History: Great Falls Explorers; 2006–2008
- Arena: Four Seasons Arena; 2006–2008
- Capacity: 5,054
- Location: Great Falls, Montana
- Team colors: Sky blue, navy
- Team manager: Ryan Acra
- Head coach: Rick Turner
- Ownership: West Coast Sports, LLC

The Great Falls Explorers were a team in the Continental Basketball Association (CBA) founded in 2006. The team played their home games at the Four Seasons Arena in Great Falls, Montana. The franchise was branded 'Explorers' in honor of Lewis and Clark traveled through the area. The Explorers, previously coached by Steve Aggers, was coached by Scott Wedman for the 2007–2008 season. The team's front office is led by General Manager Ryan Acra.

== History ==
The Explorers were originally owned by Apex Sportstainment (then owners of the Butte Daredevils and Minot SkyRockets). The team's first coach, Steve Aggers, previously coached the College of Great Falls basketball program. In their inaugural season, the Explorers recorded a 24-24 record but finished short of the playoffs. The Explorers had two CBA all stars in guard Malik Moore and forward Jamar Howard. The CBA Rookie of the Year was Explorers power forward Travis Garrison. The Explorers averaged just over 700 in attendance per game. During the offseason, Kermit Young and Steve Aggers were not asked to return for another season. The team ceased operations after the 2006–07 season.

== See also ==
- Billings RimRockers
- Butte Daredevils
- Montana Golden Nuggets
