= David Printz =

Swedish ice hockey player (born 1980)

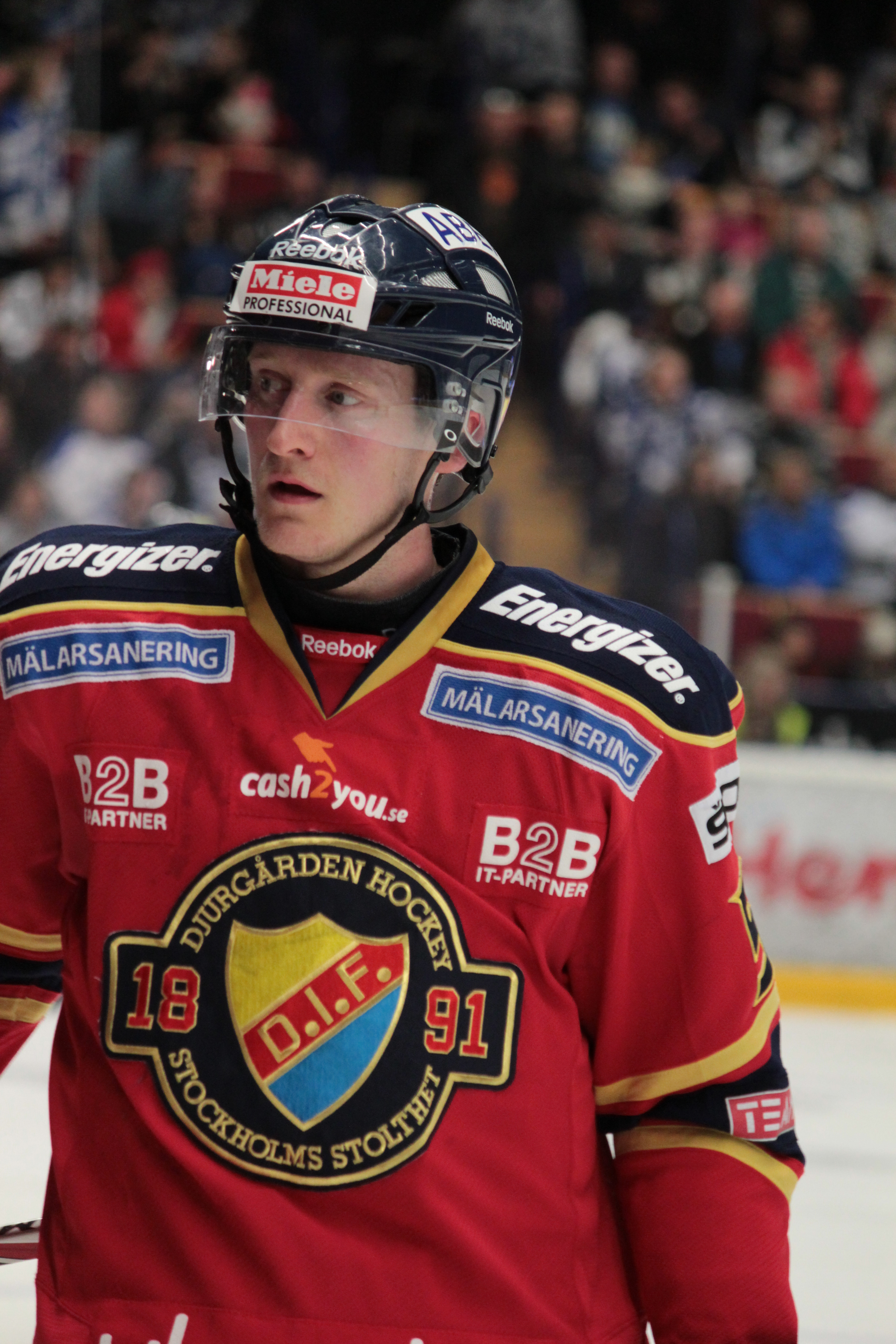
- Born: July 24, 1980 (age 45) Solna, Sweden
- Height: 6 ft 5 in (196 cm)
- Weight: 220 lb (100 kg; 15 st 10 lb)
- Position: Defense
- Shot: Left
- Played for: AIK IF; HPK; Ilves Tampere; Philadelphia Flyers; Djurgårdens IF; HC Slovan Bratislava; Dornbirner EC; KalPa; Thomas Sabo Ice Tigers; Karlskrona HK; Timrå IK; Frölunda HC
- NHL draft: 225th overall, 2001; Philadelphia Flyers
- Playing career: 2001–2020

David Printz (born July 24, 1980) is a Swedish former professional ice hockey defenceman, who last played for Frölunda HC of the Swedish Hockey League (SHL).

== Playing career ==
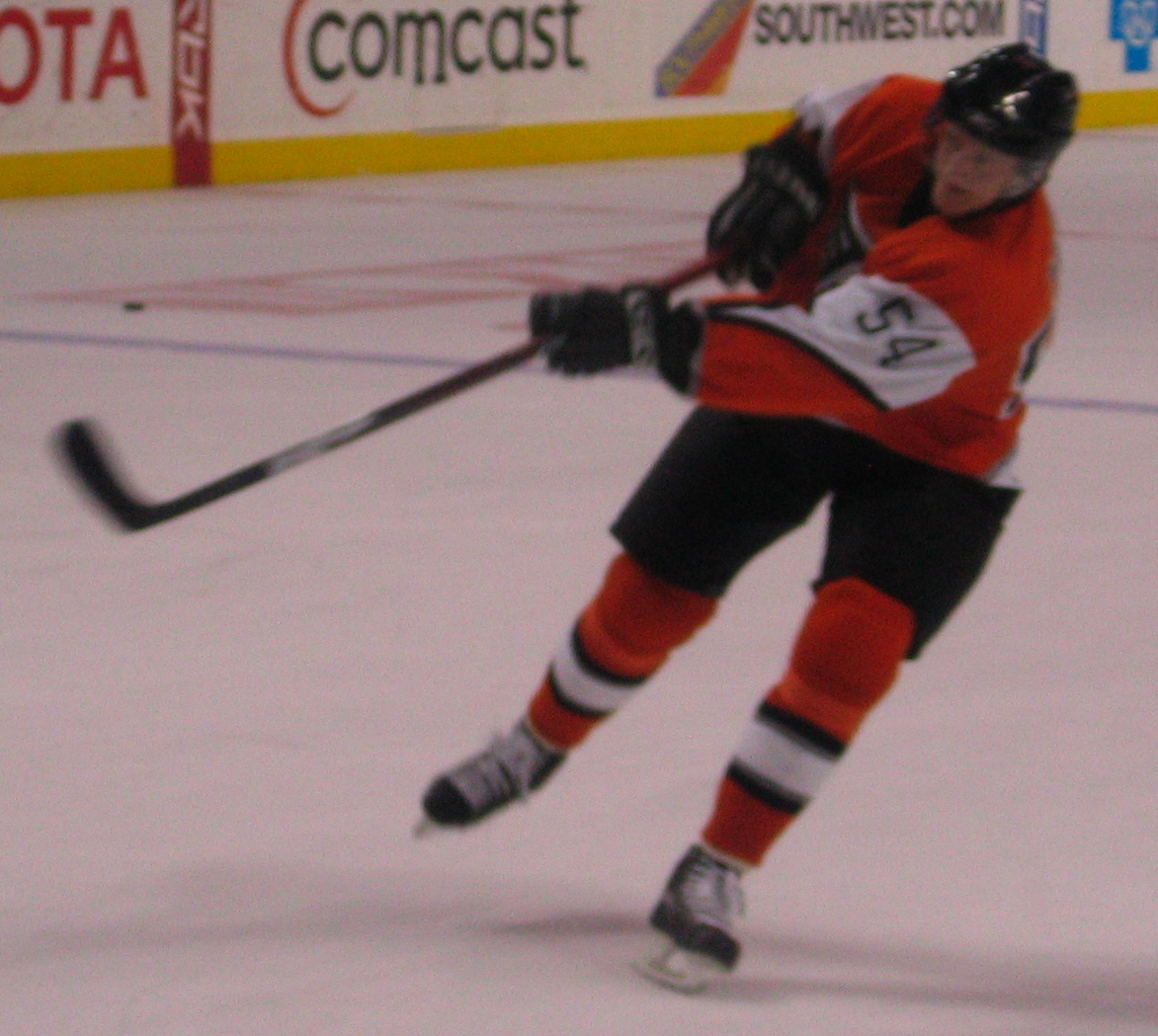
Printz played 13 NHL games over parts of two seasons with the Philadelphia Flyers.

Printz is a product of the AIK youth system. He moved to the US for the 2000–01 season, joining AWHL side Great Falls Americans.

Back in his native Sweden, he played in 37 games for his hometown side AIK in the 2001-02 SHL season, before moving to Finland for the following campaign, splitting the season between Liiga clubs HPK and Ilves. In 2003–04, he returned to AIK, then playing in Sweden's second-tier league, the Allsvenskan.

Drafted 225th overall in the 2001 NHL entry draft by the Philadelphia Flyers, Printz came to North America prior to the 2004–05 AHL season. He played in 50 regular season games and 1 playoff game for the Calder Cup Champion Philadelphia Phantoms. The following season he played in 80 games for the Phantoms and played in his first NHL game after being called up late in the 2005–06 season. In 2006–07, he played 12 more games with the Flyers. Following the season, he signed with Djurgårdens IF, where he played until the end of the 2011-12 campaign.

Printz went to Slovakia for the 2012–13 season, joining KHL club HC Slovan Bratislava, for whom he played only one game before moving to Dornbirner EC of the EBEL for the remainder of the season.

He started the 2013–14 season with KalPa of Finland's Liiga, but transferred to Germany during the season, signing with the Nürnberg Ice Tigers of the top flight Deutsche Eishockey Liga.

== Career statistics ==
| | | | Regular season | | | | | Playoffs |
| Season | Team | League | GP | G | A | Pts | PIM | GP | G | A | Pts | PIM |
|---|---|---|---|---|---|---|---|---|---|---|---|---|
| 1996–97 | AIK | J20 | 1 | 0 | 0 | 0 | 0 | — | — | — | — | — |
| 1997–98 | AIK | J20 | 8 | 0 | 0 | 0 | 6 | — | — | — | — | — |
| 1998–99 | AIK | J20 | 23 | 1 | 0 | 1 | 14 | — | — | — | — | — |
| 1999–2000 | AIK | J20 | 36 | 8 | 4 | 12 | 53 | — | — | — | — | — |
| 2000–01 | Great Falls Americans | AWHL | 54 | 13 | 23 | 36 | 93 | 13 | 3 | 5 | 8 | 16 |
| 2001–02 | AIK | J20 | 8 | 2 | 3 | 5 | 20 | — | — | — | — | — |
| 2001–02 | AIK | SEL | 37 | 3 | 2 | 5 | 59 | — | — | — | — | — |
| 2002–03 | HPK | SM-liiga | 17 | 1 | 0 | 1 | 10 | — | — | — | — | — |
| 2002–03 | Ilves | SM-liiga | 25 | 1 | 2 | 3 | 10 | — | — | — | — | — |
| 2003–04 | AIK | J20 | 5 | 0 | 2 | 2 | 29 | — | — | — | — | — |
| 2003–04 | AIK | Allsv | 41 | 0 | 7 | 7 | 42 | 10 | 2 | 2 | 4 | 18 |
| 2004–05 | Philadelphia Phantoms | AHL | 50 | 1 | 5 | 6 | 77 | 1 | 0 | 0 | 0 | 0 |
| 2004–05 | Trenton Titans | ECHL | 2 | 0 | 1 | 1 | 0 | — | — | — | — | — |
| 2005–06 | Philadelphia Phantoms | AHL | 80 | 6 | 14 | 20 | 135 | — | — | — | — | — |
| 2005–06 | Philadelphia Flyers | NHL | 1 | 0 | 0 | 0 | 0 | — | — | — | — | — |
| 2006–07 | Philadelphia Phantoms | AHL | 62 | 4 | 12 | 16 | 73 | — | — | — | — | — |
| 2006–07 | Philadelphia Flyers | NHL | 12 | 0 | 0 | 0 | 4 | — | — | — | — | — |
| 2007–08 | Djurgårdens IF | SEL | 54 | 6 | 9 | 15 | 71 | 5 | 0 | 1 | 1 | 4 |
| 2008–09 | Djurgårdens IF | SEL | 52 | 5 | 5 | 10 | 52 | — | — | — | — | — |
| 2009–10 | Djurgårdens IF | SEL | 55 | 2 | 5 | 7 | 71 | 16 | 0 | 1 | 1 | 10 |
| 2010–11 | Djurgårdens IF | SEL | 50 | 1 | 7 | 8 | 79 | 7 | 0 | 0 | 0 | 2 |
| 2011–12 | Djurgårdens IF | SEL | 43 | 0 | 3 | 3 | 34 | — | — | — | — | — |
| 2012–13 | HC Slovan Bratislava | KHL | 1 | 0 | 0 | 0 | 2 | — | — | — | — | — |
| 2012–13 | Dornbirner EC | AUT | 32 | 4 | 9 | 13 | 48 | — | — | — | — | — |
| 2013–14 | KalPa | Liiga | 5 | 0 | 0 | 0 | 4 | — | — | — | — | — |
| 2013–14 | Thomas Sabo Ice Tigers | DEL | 33 | 0 | 5 | 5 | 62 | 2 | 0 | 0 | 0 | 0 |
| 2014–15 | Thomas Sabo Ice Tigers | DEL | 45 | 1 | 6 | 7 | 94 | 5 | 0 | 0 | 0 | 4 |
| 2015–16 | Thomas Sabo Ice Tigers | DEL | 46 | 1 | 5 | 6 | 69 | 12 | 0 | 3 | 3 | 4 |
| 2016–17 | Karlskrona HK | SHL | 44 | 0 | 4 | 4 | 20 | — | — | — | — | — |
| 2017–18 | Karlskrona HK | SHL | 52 | 0 | 10 | 10 | 46 | — | — | — | — | — |
| 2018–19 | Timrå IK | SHL | 27 | 0 | 2 | 2 | 39 | — | — | — | — | — |
| 2018–19 | Frölunda HC | SHL | 14 | 1 | 0 | 1 | 8 | 16 | 0 | 0 | 0 | 4 |
| SHL totals | | | 474 | 18 | 54 | 72 | 511 | 44 | 0 | 2 | 2 | 20 |
| AHL totals | | | 192 | 11 | 31 | 42 | 274 | 1 | 0 | 0 | 0 | 0 |
| NHL totals | | | 13 | 0 | 0 | 0 | 4 | — | — | — | — | — |

== Awards and honours ==
| Award | Year |
|---|---|
AWHL
| Champion (Great Falls Americans) | 2001 |
AHL
| Calder Cup (Philadelphia Phantoms) | 2005 |
CHL
| Champions (Frölunda HC) | 2019 |
SHL
| Le Mat Trophy (Frölunda HC) | 2019 |
