= Joe Abbrescia =

American painter (1936–2005)

Joseph Abbrescia
- Born: October 1, 1936; New York City, U.S.
- Died: February 17, 2005 (aged 68); Kalispell, Montana, U.S.
- Education: American Academy of Art
- Occupation: Painter
- Spouse: Sue
- Children: 2 sons

Joseph L. Abbrescia (October 1, 1936 - February 17, 2005) was an American painter of the American West. By 2002, he had become "one of the country's most accomplished plein-air artists."

== Early life ==
Abbrescia was born on October 1, 1936, in New York City. He attended the American Academy of Art in Chicago.

== Career ==
With his brother, Abbrescia was the co-director of an art school in Skokie, Illinois, from the 1950s to the 1970s, when he moved to Kalispell, Montana, to focus on his own paintings. Abbrescia painted the American West. By 2002, he had become "one of the country's most accomplished plein-air artists."

Abbrescia won the Best of Show distinction at the C. M. Russell Auction of Original Western Art three times: once in 2002, and twice in 2004. He also won the Honorary Chairman's Award from the C. M. Russell Museum in Great Falls, Montana, in 2005.

== Personal life and death ==
With his wife Sue, Abbrescia had two sons.

Abbrescia died of cancer on February 17, 2005, in Kalispell, Montana, at age 68.
