= Western Art Week =

Art festival in Great Falls, Montana, US

Western Art Week is an annual visual arts festival held in the city of Great Falls, Montana, every March. The focus of the festival is Western art, and the festival is always held the same week as the March 19th birthday of noted Western artist Charles Marion Russell. Various events are held during Western Art Week, including the C.M. Russell Museum's "The Russell" art sale, the Western Heritage Artists Association Art Show, the Jay Contway and Friends Art Show, March in Montana (an art show and auction presented by the Coeur d'Alene Art Auction and Manitou Galleries), a Montana version of the Wild Bunch Art Show, and the Western Masters Art Show. The event draws bidders and artists from around the world, and the travel guide Frommer's has called it one of the finest Western auctions in the United States. Another source has said the event "is widely regarded as the nation's largest and finest auction of original western art of the 19th and 20th centuries."

== History ==
Western Art Week was founded in 1969. The event was built around the C.M. Russell Art Auction, which was founded by local television personality and civic booster Norma Ashby to benefit the C.M. Russell Museum. The first year brought in around $20,000 with the 65 works sold with half going to benefit the museum. The C.M. Russell Art Auction raised more than $5.6 million for the museum between 1969 and 2009. The Western Heritage Artists Association Art Show was added in 1981, and the Native American Art Show in 1982. The Jay Contway art show (sponsored by a local artist) became part of Western Art Week in 1985. Manitou Galleries began hosting the concurrent "March in Montana" art event in 2007, although the gallery had been holding auctions during Western Art Week since 1982. As of 2007, Western Art Week was one of the largest events held in the city of Great Falls each year.

In 2009, the C.M. Russell Museum and the Great Falls Ad Club (a nonprofit organization of local business owners dedicated to promoting the local economy) ended their joint sponsorship of the C.M. Russell Art Auction. While the Ad Club continued to hold the auction, the museum established a new event, "The Russell" art auction, whose sole beneficiary will be the C.M. Russell Museum. Many local leaders and artists worried that the competing shows would hurt both organizations and lead to much lower sales. However, in April 2010 the C.M. Russell Museum said that it had net proceeds of $605,473 from its March 2010 event, compared to just $120,829 from the jointly-run 2009 effort. The museum announced it would continue to hold the separate "The Russell" auction in 2011. "The Russell" auction ($1.57 million) just edged out the March in Montana show ($1.45 million) in total gross sales.

The Ad Club discontinued the C.M. Russell Art Auction after the March 2010 event. In 2011, Bigfork, Montana, natives Steve Cawdrey and Pat Hagan co-founded a new art auction, the Western Masters Art Show and Sale, to replace the former event. Also discontinued in 2011 was the Native American Art Show (although many of the artists and organizers joined the Contway show). Another new art show, the Wild Bunch Art Show, also started operations in 2011. (Wild Bunch Art Shows are also held in Glasgow, Montana, and Williston, North Dakota.)

The COVID-19 pandemic caused 2020 to go on hiatus. It returned the next year, virtually.

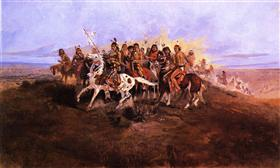
The War Party

In 2024 the Russell Art Auction returned. Its most anticipated work was the 1896 oil painting "The War Party" which sold for $2.25 million. That year fourteen art shows were held at ten different locations.

=== 2011 Western Art Week ===
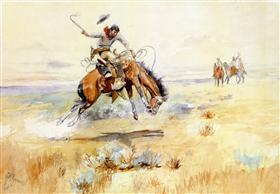
Bronco Buster

Organizers of the various art shows and auctions said they experienced improved cooperation by all Western Art Week participants in 2011. Ree Drummond, author of the blog "The Pioneer Woman," was a special speaker at the 2011 Western Art Week and signed copies of her newly released book, Black Heels to Tractor Wheels. "The Russell" auction had sales of $1.35 million, and Russell's watercolor, Bronco Buster, sold for $200,000. This was below estimates (set at $240,000 to $280,000), but 80 percent higher than what the piece sold for in 2003 when auctioned by Christie's in New York City. Sales at the March in Montana auction were about $1.3 million. The Great Falls Tribune said the new Western Masters Art Show was slightly larger than the C.M. Russell Auction held in March 2010. Half the sales from the Western Masters Art Show's "quick finish" event benefited the Michael J. Fox Foundation.
