= Ronnie Valentine =

American basketball player (born 1957)

Personal information
- Born: November 27, 1957 (age 68) Norfolk, Virginia, U.S.
- Listed height: 6 ft 7 in (2.01 m)
- Listed weight: 210 lb (95 kg)

Career information
- High school: Norfolk Catholic (Norfolk, Virginia)
- College: Old Dominion (1976–1980)
- NBA draft: 1980: 3rd round, 51st overall pick
- Drafted by: Denver Nuggets
- Playing career: 1980–1987
- Position: Power forward
- Number: 42

Career history
- 1980–1981: Denver Nuggets
- 1981–1982: Montana Golden Nuggets
- 1982–1983: A.P.U. Udine
- 1983–1985: Detroit Spirits
- 1985: Tampa Bay Thrillers
- 1985–1986: Baltimore Lightning
- 1986: Tampa Bay Stars
- 1987: Rhode Island Gulls
- 1987: Rapid City Thrillers

Career highlights
- 2× CBA champion (1985, 1987); CBA Most Valuable Player (1982); All-CBA First Team (1982)
- Stats at NBA.com
- Stats at Basketball Reference

Ronnie L. Valentine (born November 27, 1957) is an American former professional basketball player.

== College ==
A 6'7" forward, Valentine attended Old Dominion University from 1976 to 1980. He set a school record with 2,204 points in his college career and scored ten points or more in 101 consecutive games. His career high for the Old Dominion Monarchs was 44 points in a game against Tulane University during his sophomore year. As a senior in 1980, he led Old Dominion to their first appearance in the NCAA Division I men's basketball tournament, where the team fell to UCLA.

== Professional career ==
After college, Valentine was selected by the Denver Nuggets with the 51st pick of the 1980 NBA draft. He played 24 games for the Nuggets during the 1980–81 NBA season, scoring 84 points. Valentine later played in the Continental Basketball Association, the United States Basketball League, and in Italy. In 1982, he earned the CBA's MVP Award after averaging 32 points per game for the Montana Golden Nuggets. He also led the West team with 25 points in the 1982 CBA All-Star Game. He won CBA championships with the Tampa Bay / Rapid City Thrillers in 1985 and 1987. After his playing career ended, Valentine lived homeless on the streets of Miami for 27 years.

== Career statistics ==
Legend
GP	Games played	GS	Games started	MPG	Minutes per game
FG%	Field goal percentage	3P%	3-point field goal percentage	FT%	Free throw percentage
RPG	Rebounds per game	APG	Assists per game	SPG	Steals per game
BPG	Blocks per game	PPG	Points per game	**Bold**	Career high

=== NBA ===
==== Regular season ====
Year	Team	GP	MPG	FG%	3P%	FT%	RPG	APG	SPG	BPG	PPG
1980–81	Denver	24	5.1	.378	.500	.474	1.3	.3	.3	.2	3.5

== Honors ==
Valentine was inducted into Old Dominion University's Sports Hall of Fame in 1985.
