= U.S. Reed =

American basketball player

Personal information
- Born: May 23, 1959 (age 67) Pine Bluff, Arkansas, U.S.
- Listed height: 6 ft 2 in (1.88 m)
- Listed weight: 175 lb (79 kg)

Career information
- High school: Pine Bluff (Pine Bluff, Arkansas)
- College: Arkansas (1977–1981)
- NBA draft: 1981: 5th round, 104th overall pick
- Drafted by: Kansas City Kings
- Position: Guard

Career history
- 1981–1982: Montana Golden Nuggets
- 1983–1984: Wisconsin Flyers

Career highlights
- All-CBA First Team (1982)
- Stats at Basketball Reference

Ulysses Cleon "U.S." Reed (born May 23, 1959) is an American former college basketball player for the Arkansas Razorbacks, perhaps best known for the half-court buzzer beating shot he sank during the 1981 NCAA Tournament to defeat the defending tournament champion Louisville Cardinals.

== College career ==
Fresh from an Arkansas state championship at Pine Bluff High School, Reed joined the Arkansas men's basketball team in 1977, at the height of the success of the "Triplets" – Sidney Moncrief, Ron Brewer and Marvin Delph – and was a key part of the team that made it to the 1978 NCAA Final Four, finishing third after losing to eventual champion Kentucky Wildcats in the semifinal game.

A guard, Reed broke into the starting line-up for the Razorbacks in his sophomore year and was a starter for the remainder of his career.

In 1979, Reed was instrumental in helping Arkansas to a very successful season following the loss of Brewer and Delph. The team, captained by Moncrief, made it to the NCAA Regional Finals before losing to the Larry Bird-led Indiana State Sycamores. In the game, Reed was called for traveling after he tripped with 1:02 remaining in the game, and the Sycamores held on for the final shot. Sycamore player Bob Heaton took five steps to the bucket and scored on a left-handed shot at the buzzer, giving ISU a 73–71 win and a trip to the Final Four, where they finished second to Magic Johnson and the Michigan State Spartans.

Following that season, Reed played as a member of the gold medal-winning American team at the 1979 World University Games, joining such teammates as Kevin McHale, Jeff Ruland and Andrew Toney.

The 1981 NCAA Tournament featured the shot that turned Reed into a star of the NCAA tournament. In the second round of the tournament, the Southwest Conference champion Razorbacks were playing the defending NCAA tournament champion Louisville Cardinals in Austin, Texas. Trailing by one with five seconds remaining in the contest, the Razorbacks threw the ball to Reed after a timeout. He was unable to get the ball to any of his teammates, including future NBA players Darrell Walker and Scott Hastings, and took a desperation shot from just beyond the mid-court line as the clock expired. The ball ripped through the net, giving Arkansas a 74–73 victory (this game was prior to the advent of the 3-point shot in the college game). Some credit this shot and the hysteria that accompanied it as what cradled the phrase "March Madness". The team lost their next game against the LSU Tigers.

As of 2015, Reed ranks number 23 on the Arkansas all-time scoring list with 1,260 points. Only 6 foot 2 inches tall (though he played center in high school), he led the Razorbacks in blocked shots in 1979 with 30. A member of three Southwest Conference championship teams, Reed ended up playing in four NCAA Tournaments during his tenure and was named National Association of Basketball Coaches All-District in 1980 and 1981.

== Post-collegiate career ==
Reed was selected in the 5th round (104th pick overall) of the 1981 NBA draft by the Kansas City Kings, though he never played in the NBA. He played one season for the Montana Golden Nuggets of the Continental Basketball Association (CBA) and was selected to the All-CBA First Team. He hurt his knee the next season in training camp with the San Antonio Spurs. He played for the Wisconsin Flyers of the CBA during the 1983–84 season.

Reed has returned to his hometown of Pine Bluff, Arkansas where he is a real estate investor and a minister at Deeper Revelation International Ministry. He spent one year as assistant coach for the Arkansas-Little Rock Trojans.
