= C. M. Russell Museum Complex =

Historic house in Montana, United States

Charles M. Russell Museum
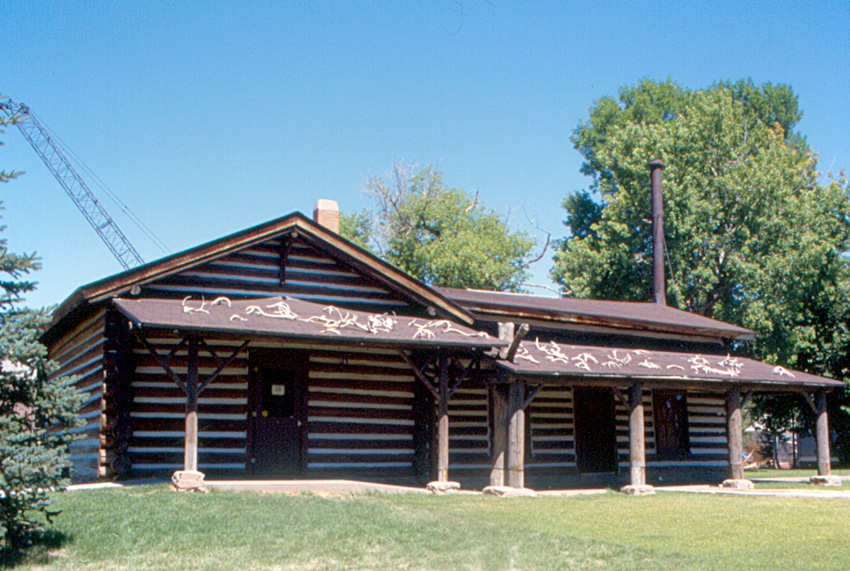

- Location within Montana Location within the United States
- Established: 1953
- Location: 1217–1219 4th Avenue North, Great Falls, Montana, U.S.
- Coordinates: 47.5096799°N 111.2863637°W
- Type: Art museum
- Visitors: 37,884 (2014)
- Director: Michael Duchemin
- Curator: Emily Wilson (Assistant Curator)
- Website: cmrussell.org
- Charles M. Russell House and Studio
- U.S. National Register of Historic Places
- U.S. National Historic Landmark
- Location: 1217–1219 4th Avenue North, Great Falls, Montana, U.S.
- Built: House (1900); Log Cabin Studio (1903)
- Architects: George Calvert (house); Charles M. Russell (log cabin)
- Architectural style: Arts & Crafts (house); Vernacular (log cabin)
- NRHP reference No.: 66000430

Significant dates
- Added to NRHP: October 15, 1966
- Designated NHL: December 21, 1965

C. M. Russell Museum Complex is an art museum located in the city of Great Falls, Montana, in the United States. The museum's primary function is to display the artwork of Great Falls "cowboy artist" Charles Marion Russell, for whom the museum is named. The museum also displays illustrated letters by Russell, work materials used by him, and other items which help visitors understand the life and working habits of Russell. In addition, the museum displays original 19th, 20th, and 21st century art depicting the American Old West and the flora, fauna, and landscapes of the American West. In 2009, the Wall Street Journal called the institution "one of America's premier Western art museums." Located on the museum property is Russell's log cabin studio, as well as his two-story wood-frame home. The house and log cabin studio were designated a National Historic Landmark in 1965, and added to the National Register of Historic Places in 1966. In 1976, the listing boundaries were amended to account for moving the house.

Beginning in 1969, the museum co-hosted the C. M. Russell Auction of Original Western Art—an auction of 19th, 20th, and 21st century art of the American West whose proceeds benefit the museum. The auction has received media attention in Australia, Canada, France, Germany, Japan, New Zealand, the United Kingdom, and the United States. In 2010, the two co-hosts parted ways, and the C. M. Russell Museum inaugurated a new auction, "The Russell."

== History of the museum ==
=== Founding of the museum ===
Emma Josephine Trigg (usually known only by her middle and last name) was the daughter of Albert Trigg, owner of the Brunswick Saloon in Great Falls. She became an art teacher in the Great Falls Public Schools, and in 1911 became the children's librarian at the Great Falls Public Library. Trigg later was briefly married to W. T. Ridgley, a local printer who published books of Russell's works as well as an autobiography of a local civic leader which Russell illustrated. The Brunswick Saloon was one of Russell's favorite bars, and Albert Trigg allowed Russell to use one of his back rooms as an art studio. In 1900, Russell built a two-story clapboard house near the Trigg home, and in 1903 built a log cabin studio on an empty lot between the two houses. Russell became acquainted with "Miss Josephine" (as he referred to her) when Trigg was a teenager, and they remained friends for the rest of Russell's life. Trigg often accompanied Russell and his wife on vacations, and she provided calligraphy for many of his letters, postcards, and illustrated items (such as place settings at dinner parties).

Charles M. Russell was a professional artist for the last 30 years of his life. He created an estimated 4,000 to 4,500 works of art. His wife, Nancy Russell, retained some works, including a large number of models and molds from which bronze sculptures had been cast, as well as nearly all of Charlie Russell's papers. When she died in 1940, the papers were given to her adopted son, Jack. But most of Russell's artwork had been sold during his lifetime. Sid Willis, proprietor of the Mint Saloon in Great Falls (another of Russell's favorite bars), allowed Russell to drink there in exchange for paintings, and by the time of Russell's death had amassed a collection of 90 oil paintings, watercolors, drawings, models, wax sculptures, and ephemera. In 1948, Willis put his collection up for sale. A "Charles Russell Memorial Committee" unsuccessfully attempted to raise the purchase price to keep the "Mint Collection" in Montana. Texas newspaper publisher Amon G. Carter purchased the collection for $200,000 in 1952 and established the Amon Carter Museum to house it. C. R. Smith, chief executive officer of American Airlines, purchased 46 bronzes (which comprised about half of the artwork in Nancy Russell's estate) in 1940, while oil company executive Charles S. Jones purchased the remainder. The Amon Carter Museum eventually purchased the Smith bronzes as well, and as of 2000 owned about 60 Russell bronzes. Dr. Philip G. Cole, a New York City tire company executive, had collected 46 Russell paintings and 27 bronzes, and these passed into the collection of oilman Thomas Gilcrease in 1944. Wall Street financier Malcolm S. Mackay collected another 60 paintings, watercolors, ink drawings, bronzes, letters, Christmas cards, and photographs. These were loaned to the Northern Hotel in Billings in 1942, and in 1952 were purchased by the Montana Historical Society Museum for $59,000 (although the collection had been priced at over $3 million). A collection of 16 works, held by the family of Cleveland, Ohio, banker and philanthropist George Gund, was permanently loaned to the Eiteljorg Museum of American Indians and Western Art.

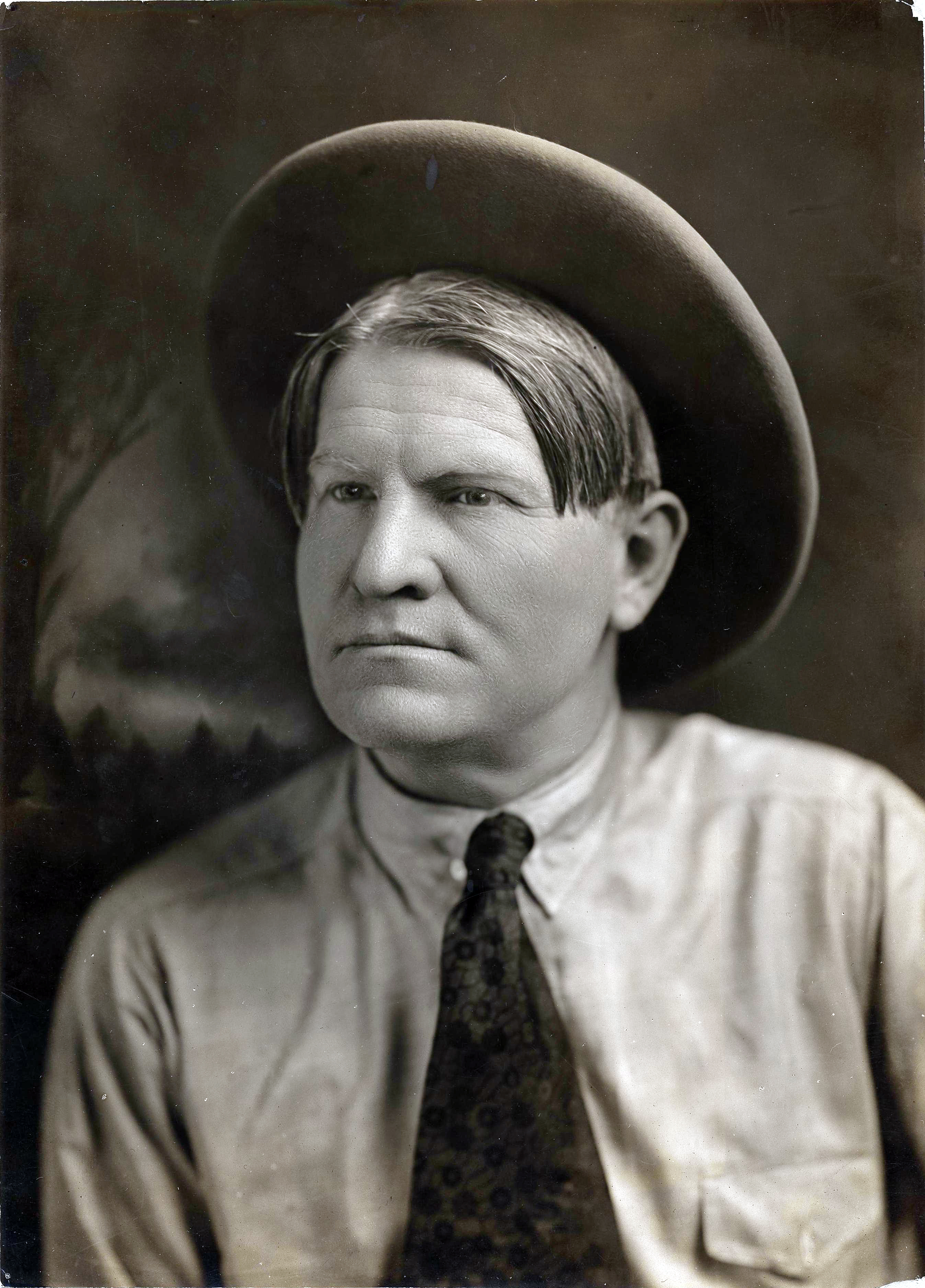
Charles Marion Russell in 1900.

Josephine Trigg, however, had a collection of 153 oil paintings, watercolors, illustrated letters, bookmarks, models and postcards, many of which did not depict Old West images. Trigg's will established a Trigg-C.M. Russell Foundation and donated these items to the city provided that the city built a museum to house the collection within two years. Leonard Regan, an executive with the Montana Power Company, led a fundraising drive which netted $75,000, and in 1953 the Trigg-Russell Memorial Gallery (as the museum was originally known) opened on September 26, 1953. The building cost $58,175 to construct.

=== Museum history ===
In its first two years, the museum had 38,000 visitors. In 1957, its first major non-Russell show, an exhibit of Norman Rockwell original paintings, opened. From 1955 to 1958, the museum saw visitorship of roughly 10,500 a year. The average yearly dropoff of more than a third led the museum to broaden its scope. In 1960, the museum's board of directors agreed to expand the collection to include contemporary artists depicting the Old West.

Also in 1960, the Great Falls chapter of the Junior League (a women's civic organization) paid for a study which analyzed expanding the museum. In 1962, the Amon Carter Museum's "Mint Collection" was exhibited at the museum. Promotion of the museum, its expanding collection, and the "Mint Collection" exhibit dramatically raised visitorship to more than 23,000 people in 1963. With visitorship rising, local construction company owner and philanthropist John L. McLaughlin agreed to give the museum $100,000 to build an expansion if, in turn, the museum raised $350,000 in matching funds. With the fundraising campaign moving ahead swiftly, the local firm of Page-Werner Architects was retained to design the addition. To boost the campaign, the Montana Stockgrowers Association, owner of Russell's famous 1887 watercolor "Waiting for a Chinook" (also known as "Last of the 5,000"), agreed to let the museum exhibit the artwork which had made Russell a national name. Construction on the $307,000 addition began in 1968 (with McLaughlin Construction doing the work), and the new galleries opened in 1969.

The fundraising campaign highlighted the need to diversify the Trigg-Russell Memorial Gallery's sources of income. In 1968, local television personality and civic booster Norma Ashby proposed hosting a worldwide auction of Old West art (both older and contemporary), to be named the C.M. Russell Art Auction, to benefit the gallery. The auction would be held the same week as Russell's March 19 birthday. The Great Falls Ad Club, a nonprofit organization of local business owners dedicated to promoting the local economy, agreed to co-host the auction with the gallery. The first auction was held in March 1969 at the Rainbow Hotel in Great Falls.

In 1970, another new gallery space at the Trigg-Russell opened. Charles A. Bovey, a wealthy Great Falls area rancher, had long been interested in the state's history. Bovey had collected numerous historic artifacts, preserved large numbers of historic state records, and even purchased and preserved historic buildings across the state. He also purchased and restored most of Virginia City, Montana, the former territorial capital which had become a ghost town. In 1969, Bovey and his wife financed the construction of a new gallery beneath the existing museum. The new lower gallery opened in 1970.

In 1972, the Trigg-Russell Gallery was officially renamed the C.M. Russell Museum. Expansion of the collection followed. The museum was first accredited by the American Alliance of Museums in 1974. In 1975, Richard J. Flood donated a collection of more than 1,000 Russell letters, writings, postcards, and other memorabilia (including several pieces of art) worth $600,000 to the museum. In 1979, Montana sculptor Robert Scriver's lifesize bronze statue of Russell was donated to the museum and placed in front of the south main entrance.

By 1980, the museum had purchased several empty plots of land next to the museum. In 1982, with the collection still expanding, the C.M. Russell Museum undertook a $3 million capital fundraising campaign to double the size of the facility from 23,000 square feet (2,100 m^{2}) to 46,000 square feet (4,300 m^{2}). That same year, the city of Great Falls, which owned the Russell home and log cabin studio, turned over management of both structures to the museum. In 1982, Bob Scriver's 53-piece sculptural history of the Piegan Blackfeet received its premiere at the museum. In 1985, with the fundraising campaign a success, the C.M. Russell museum's new addition opened. By 1989, the museum had seven galleries displaying 7,500 pieces, including artwork, memorabilia, firearms, and photographs. The collection included 80 Russell paintings, 120 Russell sculptures, 50 Russell drawings, and 27 illustrated Russell letters.

The museum took formal ownership of the Russell home and studio in 1991, and in 1994 undertook a $250,000 renovation and preservation of the log cabin structure. That same year, the museum, which had 23 permanent and temporary staff, was re-accredited by the American Alliance of Museums. It was one of five museums out of the state's 68 that were accredited. The following year, the museum raised $1.1 million from local residents to purchase Russell's large oil painting of a bull elk, "The Exalted Ruler," from the local Elks Lodge No. 214. In 1968, the museum began managing another museum, the Bair Family Museum in Martinsdale, Montana.

The museum began a second, three-year, $5 million capital campaign ("Trails to the Future") in 1997, which was intended to fund construction of yet another expansion. The museum completed a $76,600 restoration of the exterior of the Russell home the same year. The 1999, the museum had 46 permanent and temporary staff. The museum constructed a new parking lot on the north side of the museum that same year. The museum also sold the historic three-story brick Strain home at 825 4th Avenue North to local attorney Channing Hartelius for about $295,000.

The "Trails to the Future" capital campaign closed in 2000 with a total of $6.5 million raised. The planned expansion added 30,000 square feet (2,800 m^{2}) to the museum's total interior space, and with other renovations increased the gallery space by 33,000 square feet (3,100 m^{2}). The building itself cost $5 million, with the rest going for other purposes. The new gallery space was used to house more Russell artworks, as well as the horse-drawn hearse used during Russell's 1926 funeral. It also included a new exhibition space, the New West Gallery, intended to feature contemporary artists. Other new galleries included a children's space, a photography gallery, and the "Good Medicine" gallery dedicated to depictions of Native Americans and their culture. The museum also opened a new gallery dedicated to the work of Russell contemporary O.C. Seltzer, a sculpture garden featuring 20 works by sculptor Bob Scriver, and a new Frederic G. Renner Library and Research Center to house the museum's reference and archival materials.

The new expansion opened in 2001. According to the Great Falls Tribune, a local newspaper, "With the expansion, the museum reached a sort of critical mass that tipped it into the ranks of the world's major Western art museums." One of the biggest logistical changes the expansion made was moving the main entrance of the museum from the south to the north side. The new galleries featured walls in warm earth tones, hundreds of artworks in storage were put on display. The expansion also allowed the museum to display the Mint Saloon's original safe. T.D. Kelsey's bronze sculpture of two bison, Change of Seasons, was placed near the east entrance. The next year, the Allen Foundation for the Arts gave the museum a $10,000 grant to help it build visitorship. Also in 2002, an anonymous bidder purchased the Russell watercolor "Waiting" for $240,000 and then donated it to the museum. In 2003, facing high costs to keep the museum open, the C.M. Russell Museum closed the Bair Family Museum. In March 2003, the museum purchased Russell's oil painting "Four Generations." The work had been owned by the local salvage firm Carl Weissman & Sons, Inc., but in 1962 the company gave the museum a one-third interest in it. The firm went bankrupt in 2002 and was ordered to sell its remaining interest in the painting. The purchase price for the $260,000 work was $173,342. Later that year, clay sculptures depicting the museum through the years were installed in the sculpture garden.

In 2004, the museum changed the way it displayed its Russell works. Previously, the museum had displayed the best-known and biggest pieces more prominently, with smaller pieces surrounding them to enhance their appearance. The museum now began displaying pieces chronologically, to show how Russell developed as an artist. Among the early works were two small oil paintings Russell did at the age of 13 and another painted when he was 14. That same year, the Institute of Museum and Library Sciences (an agency of the U.S. federal government), gave the museum $150,000 to enhance is curatorial capacity. The museum raised another $305,000 to match the grant. A month later, the Dufresne Foundation (a local philanthropic foundation) gave the museum $100,000. Restructuring of the galleries continued in 2005. The museum moved the 200-piece Browning Firearms Collection to the front of the museum and installed the original back bar of the Mint Saloon in one of the galleries. The museum also opened a cafe in the museum, which proved to be highly popular. Two steel sculptures by Billings artist Lyndon Pomeroy, "Cow in the Mountains" and "Wheat", were installed on the boulevard on the far side of the north parking lot.

In 2007, the Mitch family donated more than 50 Scriver bronzes to museum. The Mitches owned the foundry where Scriver had his works cast, and bartered their services to him for artwork. The following year, the museum received a $375,000 grant from the National Endowment for the Arts (NEA) in support of its new exhibition, "The Bison: American Icon, Heart of Plains Indian Culture." The total cost of the exhibit was $1.5 million. NEA's Tom Phelps called the show "a nationally significant exhibition". The following year, the NEA gave the museum another $50,000 stimulus funds to cover a severe shortfall in visitorship. In March 2011, the John "Jack" McDowell Hoover donated three works by Russell and one by Seltzer to the museum. The three Russell works were: "The Lone Wolf" (1900), a large oil painting depicting solitary wolf on the plains; "The Last Laugh" (1916), a bronze of a wolf standing on a human's skull; and "When the Longest Blade Was Right" (1922), a watercolor of knight on horseback threatening a court jester with a sword. The C.M. Russell Museum was re-accredited in 2011 by the American Alliance of Museums for another 10 years.

As of 2011, the museum consisted of 76,000 square feet (7,100 m^{2}) of gallery and other space, and owned about 2,000 pieces of art, personal items, and artifacts associated with Russell.

== Attendance and revenues ==
The museum had approximately 19,000 visitors a year in 1953 and 1954. From 1955 to 1958, the museum saw visitorship of roughly 10,500 a year. Visitorship rose to more than 23,000 people a year in 1963.

By 2003, the museum said that 76 percent of its visitors were non-Montanans.

Year	Visitorship
1998	60,397
1999	57,582
2000	48,540
2001	54,157
2002	51,534
2003	51,758
2004	45,133
2005	50,000
2006	45,973
2007	39,503
2008	39,282
2009	?
2010	30,689
2011	34,314
2012	33,016
2013	32,424
2014	37,884

In 2006, the museum's executive director said that the organization's revenues are generated, in roughly equal parts, by the annual auction event, membership payments and donations, museum admissions, museum shop and art sales. "The Russell" auction had sales of $1.35 million in 2011.

=== The Russell: The Sale to Benefit the C.M. Russell Museum ===
In 1969, the Great Falls Ad Club (a private association of local businesses) and local television personality Norma Ashby organized the first C.M. Russell Art Auction. A portion of the proceeds from the auction of original 19th and 20th century Western art benefited the C.M. Russell Museum. Over time, this evolved into a week-long series of Western art auctions, gallery showings, public exhibitions, and more known as Western Art Week. Western Art Week is now the largest original Western art auction and exhibition in the United States. Between 1969 and 2003, the auction grossed $16 million and gave $3,771,088 to the museum.

In 2009, the museum and the Ad Club parted ways, with the museum organizing a new auction named "The Russell: The Sale to Benefit the C.M. Russell Museum." The Ad Club continued the original C.M. Russell Art Auction in 2010, but the shuttered the auction. "The Russell" held its first auction in 2010, and had net proceeds of $605,473. The second auction was held in March 2011.

== Governance and staff ==
The Trigg-C.M. Russell Foundation, which owns and operates the museum, home, and log cabin studio, is governed by officers and a board of directors. Currently, the five officers are a chair, 1st vice-chair, 2nd vice-chair, treasurer, and secretary. There are 43 members of the board of directors. (This is an increase from the 27 directors and officers the organization had prior to a large expansion of the board in 2008. Board members are limited to two consecutive three-year terms, but may be re-elected to the board after a year away from the board.

The museum suffered a spate of staff turnover in the 1990s and early 2000s. In February 1999, the museum's executive director, Lorne Render, resigned to take a position at a museum in Kansas after eight years on the job. Board member Dan Ewen resigned from the board and served as interim executive director from May to August 1999. But when Ewen returned to his private business, the museum hired Denver, Colorado-based art consultant Thomas Maytham as interim executive director. Maytham served from August to December 1999. Museum curator Elizabeth Dear served as acting executive director from December 1999 to November 2000.

A new executive director, Michael Warner, was appointed in 2000 and given a one-year contract, but Warner resigned in October 2001 after he and the board agreed that neither side was happy with the working relationship. Board member Barbara Moe agreed to serve as "acting manager" from November 2001 until a new executive director was hired.

In April 2002, the board fired the museum's long-time curator, Elizabeth Dear. The Great Falls Tribune, a local newspaper, reported that board members had interfered with her grant funding, research, and work. Dear and the museum settled out of court for undisclosed terms in June 2003.

The museum hired Inez Wolins as its new executive director on June 10, 2002. During the next two years, nearly all the museum staff resigned. Wolins herself was fired in March 2004. Although the reasons for Wolins' dismissal were not made public, the local press had reported earlier that Wolins had been forced to resign from her previous position after officials at the Samuel P. Harn Museum of Art discovered she did not have the doctorate degree which she claimed to have.

Two months later, the C.M. Russell Museum promoted curator of art Anne Morand to the position of executive director. Morand had been with the museum for only four months. Morand resigned and returned to her previous position in November 2008. Chief Financial Officer Susan Johnson was named interim director. After an eight-month search, the museum hired Darrell G. Beauchamp (former director of the Pearce Collections at Navarro College and former executive director of the Briscoe Western Art Museum) as its new executive director. Morand left in February 2010 to become curator of the National Cowboy & Western Heritage Museum, and was replaced in December 2010 by Sarah L. Burt, formerly curator at the Joslyn Art Museum.

Beauchamp resigned as the museum's executive director effective November 1, 2011, for undisclosed reasons. Due to the poor economy and a significant drop in museum funds (which led to a cut in staff and a reduction in hours the museum was open), the museum board of directors decided it would not open the search for a new executive director until economic conditions improved. Michael D. Duchemin was hired by the museum as its new executive director, effective May 1, 2013. He had previously been head of the museum department of the Arizona Historical Society's Central Arizona Division and curator at the Autry Museum of the American West, and most recently executive director for the Chinese American Museum at El Pueblo de Los Ángeles Historical Monument.

C.M. Russell Museum chief curator Sarah L. Burt died after a long battle with cancer on April 7, 2015.

== Russell house and studio ==
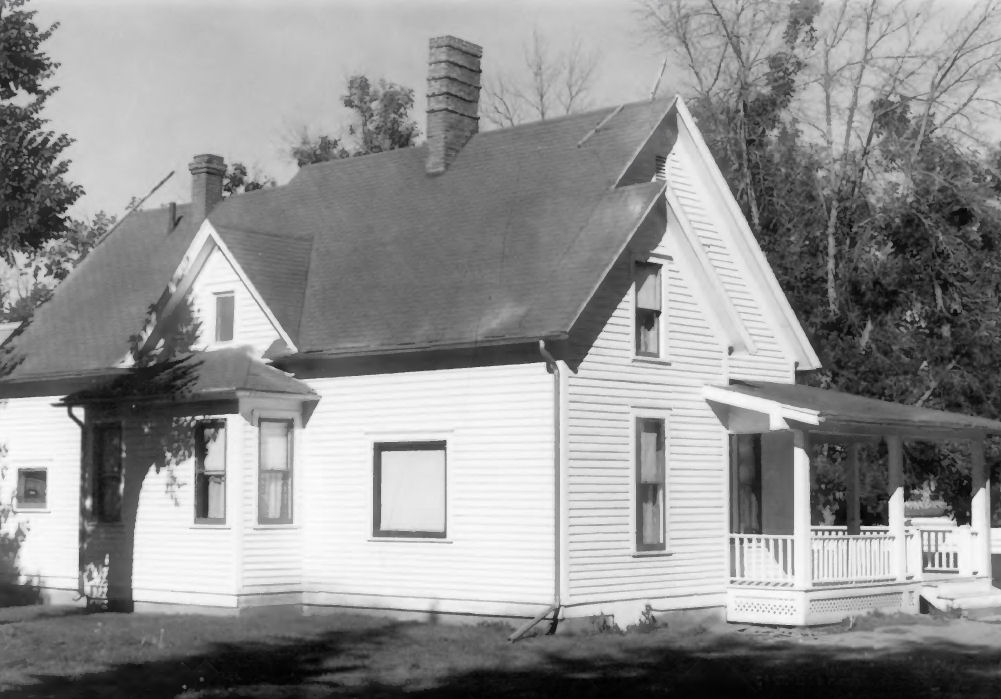
Russell's original wood-frame home, in its new location in September 1976.

In 1896, Charlie Russell and his new wife, Nancy, were living in a shack in back of a house in Cascade, Montana. In 1897, the couple moved into a rented four-room home on Seventh Avenue North in Great Falls. In December 1899, Russell's father Charles Silas Russell gave the couple $500. The estate of Mary Mead Russell, Russell's mother who died in 1895, was finally probated shortly thereafter, and in the spring of 1900 the Russells began building a new home on the corner of 13th Street and 4th Avenue North. A friend and neighbor, George Calvert, was the likely architect and constructed the house for them. The two-story wood-frame building had clapboard siding, gable roof, and wooden shake roofing shingles. It had little exterior ornamentation. The house faced south, with gable fronted dormers on the east and west and another project slightly from the southwest corner of the house. The front door led to a small front hall, and a parlor ran across the south face of the home. Also on the first floor were dining room, bathroom, kitchen, and a small maid's room off the kitchen. Some of the furniture on first floor (such as two seats, a china closet, a bookcase) were built into the home. A steep stairway led to three small bedrooms (under the gables) and a small bathroom on the second floor. The interior was paneled in dark wood. A small exterior porch ran around the southeast corner of the home. The architectural style was in the Arts and Crafts genre. The Russells occupied the home in the summer of 1900.

That same year, Charlie Russell expressed interest in constructing a log cabin studio to work in. There was a lack of good logs in Great Falls at the time, but telephone service had arrived in 1890. Russell purchased a large number of Western red cedar telephone poles, and constructed the one-room cabin from these materials. He also built a rock fireplace and chimney on the east side of the structure. The log cabin was 24 feet (7.3 m) north-south by 30 feet (9.1 m) east-west, and had a porch extending across the entire south side, on top of which Russell threw numerous elk antlers. A skylight was built into the gabled roof, and another door cut through the northeast corner of the structure. A small storage shed was attached to the cabin near this door. At some point between 1903 and 1926, Charlie Russell had the roof raised by two logs in order to accommodate a large canvas. The interior was furnished with rough, hand-made stools and benches; carpeted with buffalo and bear skins; and contained hundreds of pieces of Indian and cowboy gear. Russell also built two birdhouses against the exterior of the eastern wall.

The Trigg family home was located to the west of the log cabin studio, and a horse stable (probably shared by the Russells and the Triggs) existed between the two structures. The Trigg house and the stable were torn down in 1953 to build the C.M. Russell Museum. The Russells also apparently constructed a gray stone wall 2 to 3 feet (0.61 to 0.91 m) high in front of their two properties and a concrete set of steps up to the house. In the center of the wall was a concrete diamond-shaped emblem that contained Russell's trademark (a cattle skull and his initials). These still existed as of 1976, but have since been removed.

The National Park Service noted in 1976 that the house was little changed from when it was constructed and remained in good physical shape. Most of the lighting fixtures, interior hardware (doorknobs, faucets, hinges, etc.), and doors were original as of 1976. However, in 1973, the museum moved the house 50 feet (15 m) east and 50 feet (15 m) north of its original location. The museum owned a wood-frame house, built around 1930, which it tore down to make room for the Russell home's move. The home's original back porch was removed, the house placed on shallow concrete footings, a pillar emplaced to support the exterior fireplace and chimney, and an original shed in the back yard torn down.

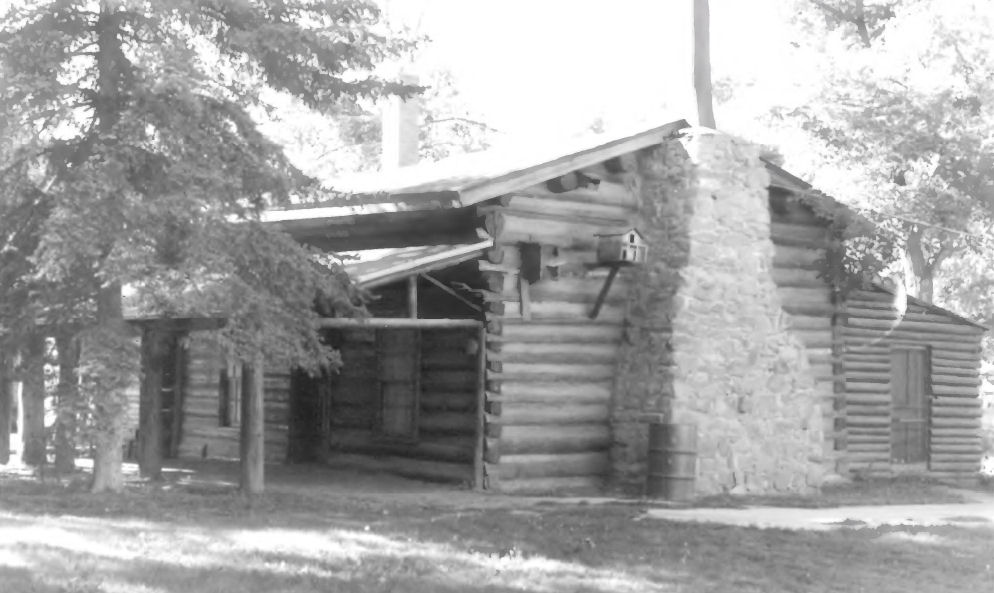
Russell's original log cabin studio in 1976.

The log cabin studio, too, had seen some change. Nancy Russell signed an agreement with the city in 1928 turning over management of the log cabin studio and its grounds to Great Falls. Between 1928 and 1930, the city (with Nancy Russell's apparent permission) built a major L-shaped addition to the west and north of the studio to act as a gallery for Russell's artwork. In 1930, the studio was opened by her to the public as a memorial to Charlie Russell. Aside from these changes, the interior of the log cabin was (as of 1976) little changed from when Russell himself used it.

Nancy Russell's will bequeathed both structures (but not their contents) to the city of Great Falls, and the city parks commission operated them until 1991 (when they were turned over to the museum). Some time prior to 1976, the city gave the Montana Federation of Garden Clubs permission to furnish the interior of the house with period furniture and provide docents to help the public interpret the home.

In early 1966—as National Historic Landmark status was about to be awarded to the Russell house—the city of Great Falls actually proposed tearing down the structure in order to build a parking lot for the museum. The city's mayor, other city officials, and several private parties all advocated tearing the structure down. The Montana Historical Society, U.S. Senator Mike Mansfield, and the Montana Federation of Garden Clubs strongly opposed this action. City officials provided a range of rationales for demolishing the Russell house: Close friends of the Russells had approved of the action, all the original furnishings were gone, the Russells did not actually occupy the house for any length of time, the house was a fire hazard, Charlie Russell "hated" the house, and that the house "detracted" from the altered studio and the non-historic museum. At one point, the city even argued that the 1928 agreement with Nancy Russell required the city to maintain a park-like appearance around the cabin—an objective which could be achieved only by demolishing the house (now that the museum had taken up all the grassy space on the lots). Although National Park Service officials repeatedly emphasized their view that the house should be retained, extensive miscommunication led city officials at various times over the next few years to believe that the federal government approved of the demolition or approved of moving the house. Demolition of the house was stayed only by the threat of legal action from the Montana Federation of Garden Clubs, which noted that the 1928 agreement required the city to maintain both structures built by the Russells. Much of the city's demand for demolition came because the plan for a park around the museum called for the home's removal. Despite a threat by the National Park Service to revoke the site's National Historic Landmark status if the house was moved, the Garden Clubs brokered a deal with the city in which the house was moved to its current location.

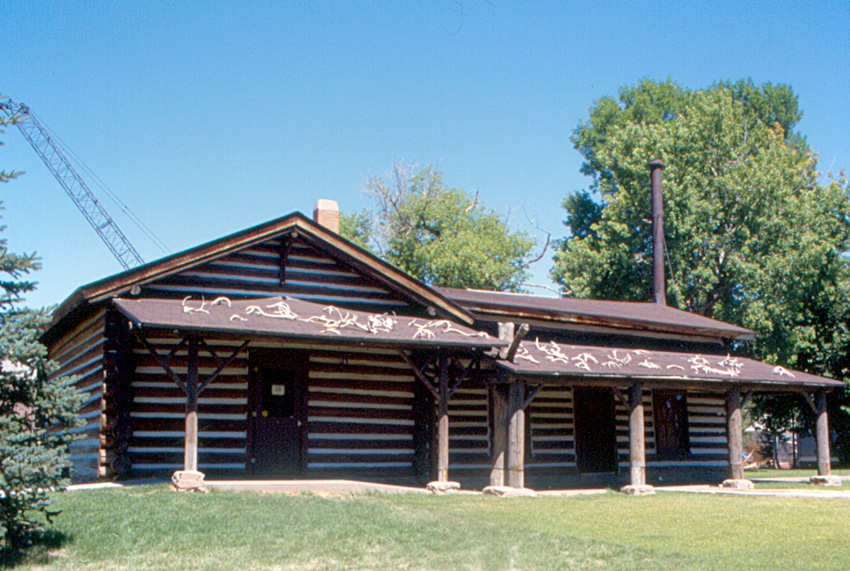
The Russell cabin and museum in 1999. Elk antlers can be seen on the roof.

After the house's move in 1973, the Garden Clubs began refurbishment of the Russell house. The city repainted the exterior of the structure, and replaced windows broken during the home's move. The Garden Clubs repainted and repapered the first floor interior, and had refurnished the house. By July 1976, the Garden Clubs was hard at work on refurbishing the second floor as well.

According to the National Park Service, "A look at earlier photographs indicates how considerably the historic arrangement and character of the site has been altered and lost." The museum crowded the studio, while the home's move had severed the relationship the house once had to the studio (an element important to Charlie Russell). The city and museum also removed the original concrete and stone pathways which indicated where the house originally stood, and the Park Service was highly critical of additional changes being implemented: "The whole complex is being redesigned and landscaped with new walkways and new vegetation, which will probably further disguise the changes which have been made."

When the site was given National Historic Place status in 1976, the National Park Service was very specific about what the site did and did not contain. The National Historic Landmark boundary encompassed only the three central lots on the north side of 4th Avenue North, and no more. This included the two original lots the Russells owned, as well as the lot to the east to which the house was moved in 1973. The C.M. Russell Museum, gardens, park, and other structures, although present on a portion of these lots, were not historic and not included within the National Historic Landmark and Site.

The Russell home is open from May to September, and is furnished with period furniture (some of which was owned by the Russells).

The log cabin studio is currently furnished with items from the first two decades of the 1900s, some of which belonged to Russell.

== See also ==
- List of single-artist museums
- List of National Historic Landmarks in Montana
- National Register of Historic Places listings in Cascade County, Montana

== Bibliography ==
- Dippie, Brian W. "Paper Talk": Charlie Russell's American West. New York: Knopf, 1979.
- Ewen, Mary Beth. Fifty Years, Fifty Favorites From the C.M. Russell Museum. Great Falls, Mont.: C.M. Russell Museum, 2003.
- Frankel, David. Masterpieces: The Best-Loved Paintings From America's Museums. New York: Simon & Schuster, 1995.
- Gerem, Yves. A Marmac Guide to Fort Worth and Arlington. Gretna, La.: Pelican Publishing Co., 2000.
- Goetzmann, William H.; Porter, Joseph C.; and Hunt, David C. The West as Romantic Horizon: Selections From the Collection of the InterNorth Art Foundation Presented at Kennedy Galleries, Sept. 14 through Oct. 2, 1981. Omaha, Neb.: Center for Western Studies, 1981.
- Grant, Marilyn. A Guide to Historic Virginia City. Helena, Mont.: Montana Historical Society Press, 1998.
- Lambert, Kirby. "Montana's Last Best Chance." Montana: The Magazine of Western History. 54:1 (Spring 2004).
- Morand, Anne; Smith, Kevin; Swan, Daniel C.; and Erwin, Sarah. Treasures of Gilcrease. Norman, Okla.: University of Oklahoma Press, 2005.
- Rostad, Lee. The House of Bair: Sheep, Cadillacs and Chippendale. Helena, Mont.: Sweetgrass Books, 2010.
- Scriver, Mary Strachan. Bronze Inside and Out: A Biographical Memoir of Bob Scriver. Calgary, Alb.: University of Calgary Press, 2007.
- Stauffer, Joan. Behind Every Man: The Story of Nancy Cooper Russell. Norman, Okla.: University of Oklahoma Press, 2008.
- Stewart, Rick. Charles M. Russell, Sculptor. New York: Abrams, 1994.
- Taliaferro, John. Charles M. Russell: The Life and Legend of America's Cowboy Artist. Norman, Okla.: University of Oklahoma Press, 2003.
