= Montana ExpoPark =

Coordinates: 47°30′50″N 111°19′09″W

- U.S. National Register of Historic Places
- U.S. Historic district
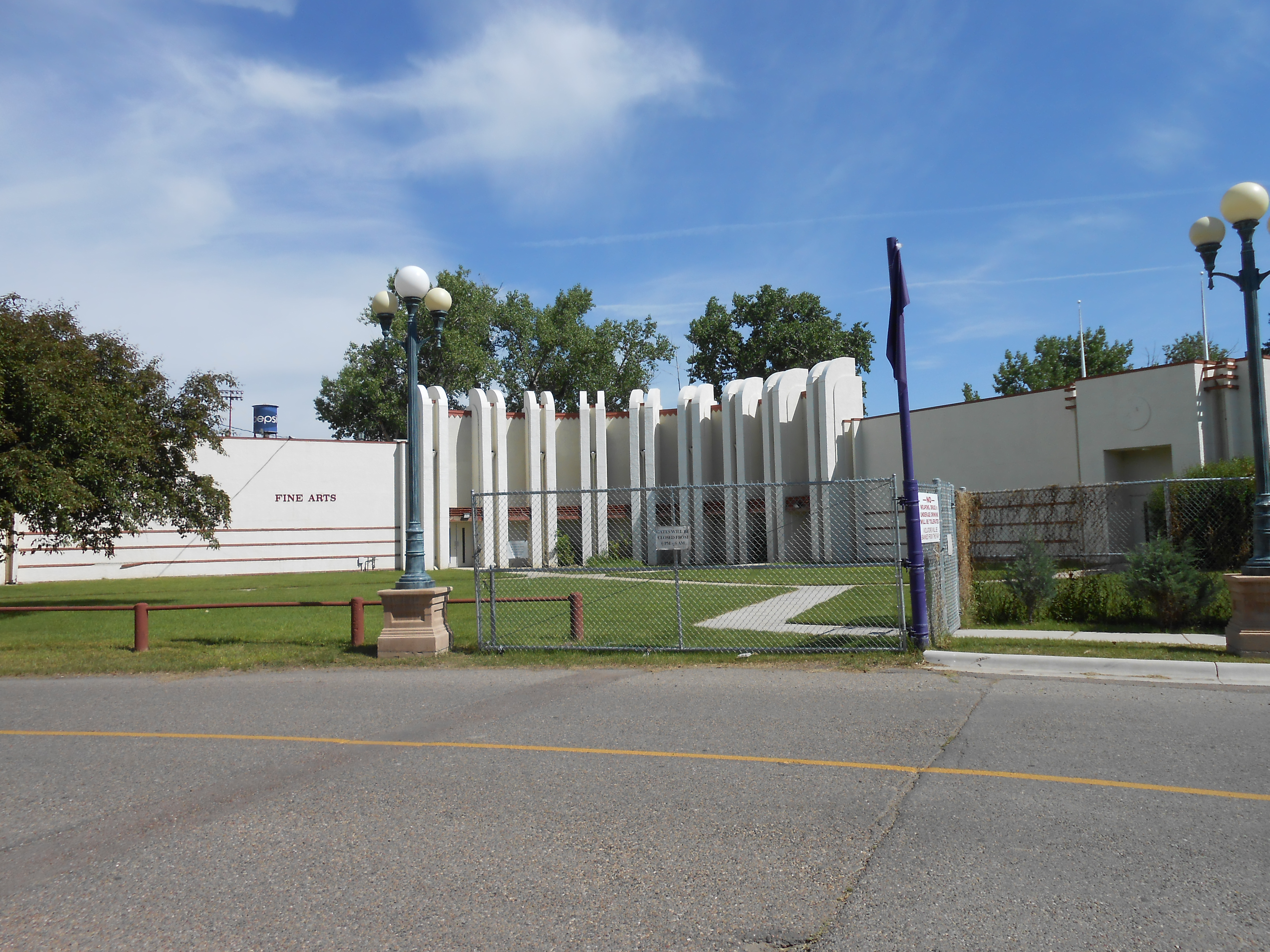
- Fine Arts building at the Montana ExpoPark

- Location within Montana
- Location: 400 3rd Street NW, Great Falls, Montana, u.S.
- Built: 1919-1938
- Architect: Gordon G. Cottier and George M. Shanley
- Architectural style: Art Deco
- Website: www.goexpopark.com
- NRHP reference No.: 88003143
- Added to NRHP: January 13, 1989

The Montana ExpoPark (formerly known as the North Montana State Fairgrounds) is a fairground located in the city of Great Falls, Montana, United States. The 133-acre (54 ha) grounds contain 35 buildings, a horse racing track, grandstands, and the Four Seasons Arena, a multi-purpose sports and exhibition venue. The site is the host of the Montana State Fair as well as agricultural shows, rodeos, basketball tournaments, and funfairs. The six original structures of the fairgrounds were added to the National Register of Historic Places in 1989.

== Construction and buildings ==
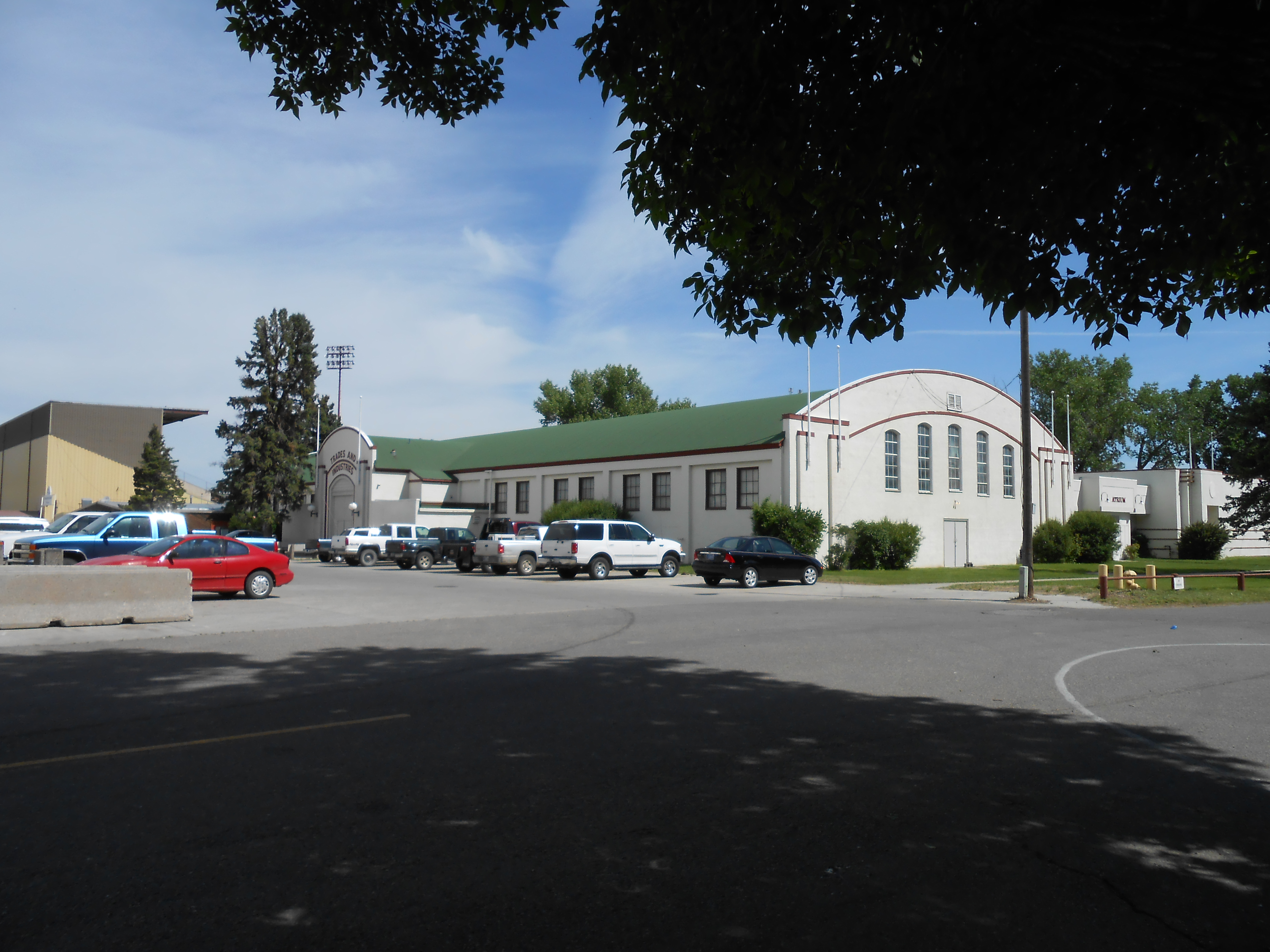
Trades and Industries Building.

The original fairgrounds were designed by Gordon G. Cottier and George M. Shanley. The original buildings, constructed in the Art Deco style, were the Atrium, Family Living Center, Fine Arts Building, Livestock Pavilion (now known as the Heritage Building), Mercantile Building, and Trades and Industries Building. Shanley designed the first building to be erected, the Livestock Pavilion, and it was constructed in 1919. Most of the buildings, however, were built between 1928 and 1938. Many of the structures completed between 1934 and 1938 were paid for by grants from the Public Works Administration. In 1939, the Montana State Fair, which had previously been held in Helena, permanently moved to Great Falls.

The fairgrounds also include three large parks: Central Park, the Family Living Park, and South Park. Other large structures include the FFA Building, the new Livestock Pavilion, the Paddock Club, and the Poultry/Rabbit Barn.

The 5,000-seat Four Seasons Arena was built in 1979. The 15,000 square feet (1,400 m^{2}) Exhibition Hall (capable of seating up to 1,500 people) was constructed adjacent to the arena in 1995.

The annual Montana State Fair, which celebrated its 80th anniversary in 2011 (no fairs in 1942-45 nor 2020), draws more than 150,000 people to the fairgrounds each year.

== Management ==
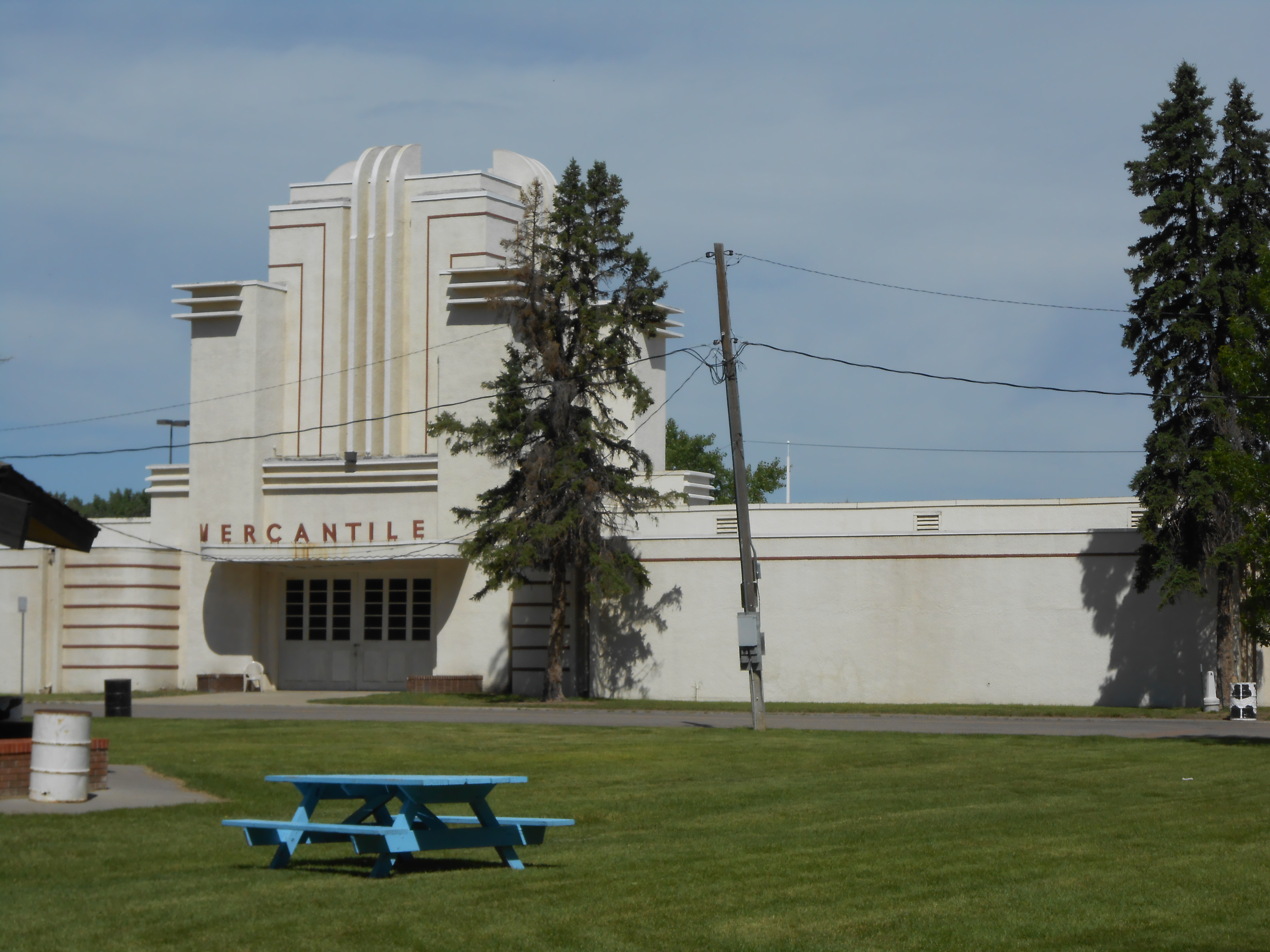
Mercantile building

Cascade County owns the fairgrounds. By 1987, the fairgrounds were more than $600,000 in debt and Cascade County's management of the Fairgrounds and Four Seasons Arena was heavily criticized. In 1988, Cascade County signed an agreement under which the city of Great Falls took over management of the fairgrounds and Four Seasons Arena. This agreement expired after 15 years, and on November 12, 2002, Cascade County signed a formal agreement to allow SMG World to take over management of the fairgrounds and arena.

The cooling system under the practice ice at Four Seasons Arena failed in April 2003, and a consultant estimated the cost of repairs at $450,000. This was money the county did not have, and the practice ice closed permanently. Due to problems with the ice cooling system and the extensive turnaround time need to transform the arena from an ice rink to other uses, SMG proposed closing the main ice rink permanently in 2005. The rink stayed open for a short period each year thereafter, but the ice rink finally closed in 2006.

Cascade County renewed its contract with SMG in 2007. The new two-year contract paid SMG $84,413 a year (about $4,000 less than the 2002 contract), and included a payment of 15 percent of operating revenues of all income over $2.5 million. SMG also received 7.5 percent of all concessions sales (down from 10 percent in the old contract). Cascade County also agreed to subsidize the fairgrounds and Four Seasons Arena by $750,000 a year, and pay the wages of all SMG employees operating the facilities.

In 2009, Cascade County declined to renew SMG's contract, concluding it had learned enough to manage the fairgrounds and arena on its own.

== Renovation ==
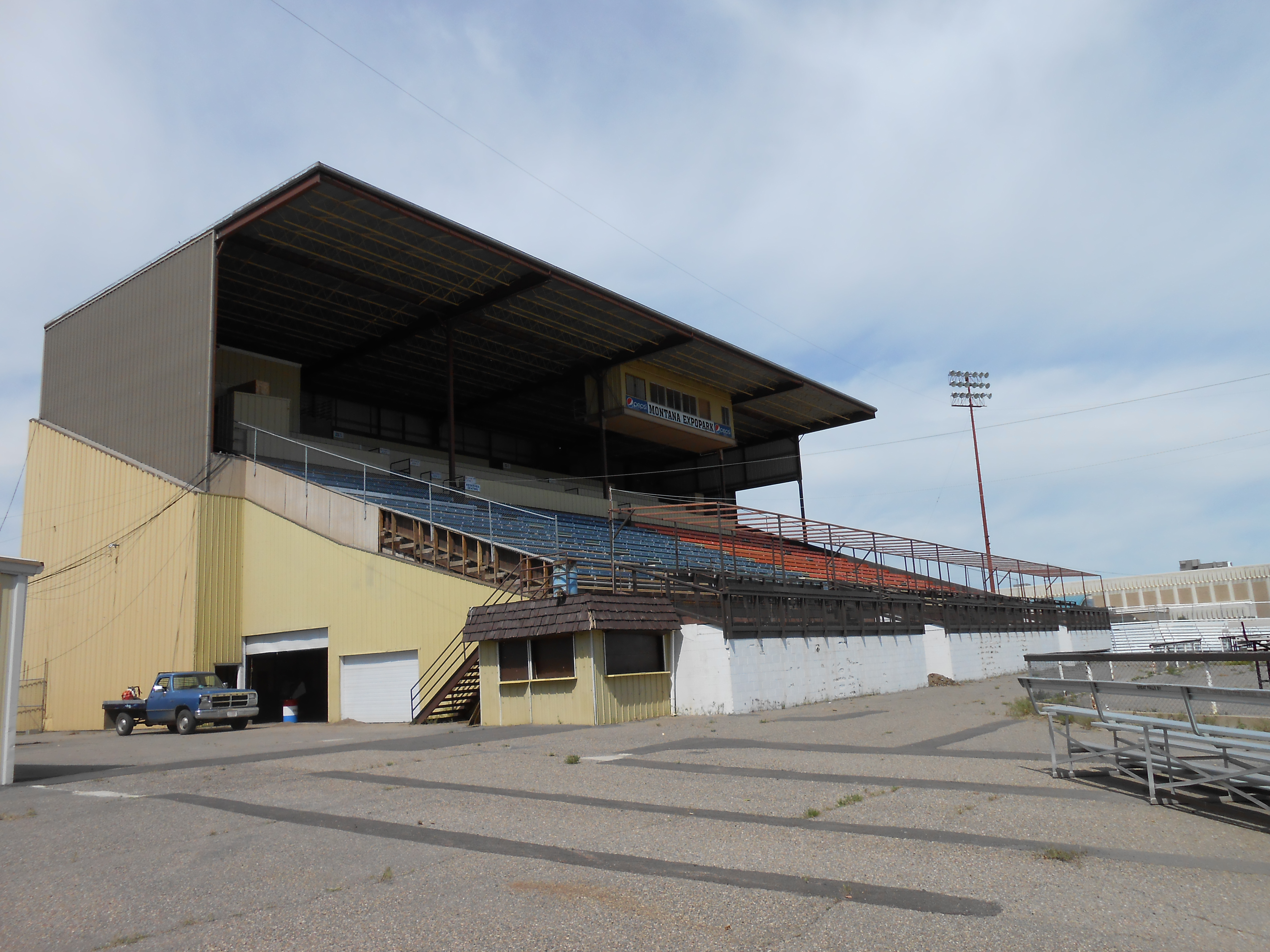
Former Grandstand in front of the horse racing track.

A major study by Cascade County and Montana ExpoPark in 2010 proposed making significant changes to the fairgrounds. The study, conducted by Markin Consulting, disclosed that the race track grandstand's concrete foundation was crumbling, the livestock pavilion's sheet metal walls were rusting, the horse barns were poorly ventilated and lit, and Four Seasons Arena suffered from poor acoustics and limited seating. The report outlined a number of options, including spending $7 million to $9 million to replace the grandstand, spending another $35 million to build a larger arena, and paying $12.6 million to demolish all existing horse barns and service facilities and build a 2,000-to-3,000 seat track just for horse racing.

Less radical solutions also existed. Four Seasons Arena could be converted into an exhibition hall, and the current Exhibition Hall transformed into a banquet hall, at a cost of $2 million. The report said an alternative to the demolition of all existing equestrian facilities would be to construct a new 300-stall horse barn.

The study did not advocate construction of a large facility like MetraPark Arena, the 10,000-seat arena and 6,500-seat grandstand in Billings.

In 2018, when concrete began falling from the underside of the grandstands, the situation reached a crisis point. At that time, the county commissioners voted to replace the grandstands. The underside was closed for the 2018 State Fair, though the grandstands themselves continued to be used that year, and demolition began immediately thereafter. By the 2019 fair, a new structure was complete. The next year saw the COVID-19 pandemic force the fair to go on hiatus.

== Bibliography ==
- Aarstad, Rich; Arguimbau, Ellen; Baumler, Ellen; Porsild, Charlene L.; and Shovers, Brian. Montana Place Names From Alzada to Zortman. Helena, Mont.: Montana Historical Society Press, 2009.
