= Great Falls Public Schools =

Public school system of Great Falls, Montana

Location
- Great Falls, Montana United States

District information
- Type: Public School District
- Motto: Great Falls. Great Schools. Greater Tomorrow.
- Established: 1886
- Superintendent: Thomas G. Moore, M.A.
- Accreditations: Montana Office of Public Instruction; National Association of Schools and Colleges Regional Accreditation Association
- Schools: 21 (2010-2011)
- Budget: $100 million (2010-2011)

Students and staff
- Students: 10,300
- Teachers: 730
- Staff: 600

Other information
- Website: http://www.gfps.k12.mt.us

The Great Falls Public Schools (also known as School District #1) is a public school district which covers the city limits of Great Falls, Montana, in the United States. As of March 2010, it was the second-largest school district in the state of Montana, and the third-largest employer in the city of Great Falls.

The district has two components: Great Falls Elementary School District and Great Falls High School District. The National Center for Education Statistics (NCES) code for the elementary district, which covers grades Pre-Kindergarten to 8, is 3013040. The NCES code for the high school district is 3013050.

The elementary school district and high school district have the same territory, and include: Great Falls, Black Eagle, Gibson Flats, Malmstrom Air Force Base, and portions of Sun Prairie and Ulm.

== History ==
The city's public school system was established in 1886. That year, the city opened the Whittier Building (later known as Whittier Elementary School) and began holding ungraded educational instruction for all students there. Great Falls High School, the city's first high school, was founded in the fall of 1890 by the city of Great Falls after four teenage girls (newly arrived in the city) asked to receive a high school public education. "Junior High School", later known as Largent Elementary School, opened in 1918 and was the city's first junior high school. The city's second high school, Charles M. Russell High School, was built in 1964 and opened in the fall of 1965. Skyline Elementary School opened in 1970, and as of 2015 was the last school building constructed in the school district.

The school district weathered a deeply divisive 15-day teachers' strike in 1975 in which class size and pay were the primary issues. A 29-day strike occurred in 1989. In the 1990s, the school system began devolving responsibility for school policy and operations to the local schools, and struggled with finding the right balance between centralization and decentralization.

In 1992, the school system was involved in an open records lawsuit that went all the way to the Montana Supreme Court. On September 10, 1990, the GFPS board of trustees met privately to discuss a report regarding collective bargaining negotiations with the Great Falls Education Association. The board rejected the report without discussion at its public session, at which time the local newspaper, the Great Falls Tribune, sued—arguing the private meeting was a violation of the Article II, Section 9, of the Montana Constitution (a particularly strongly worded provision that gives citizens the right to observe deliberations and examine documents at public meetings). GFPS attorneys argued that state law provided an exception in the case of collective bargaining negotiations. A state district court ruled in favor of the school district, but a state appellate court overturned that ruling and held the state law's collective bargaining exception to be unconstitutional. In 1992 in Great Falls Tribune Co. v. Great Falls Public Schools, the Montana Supreme Court upheld the appellate court, concluding, "The collective bargaining strategy exception is an impermissible attempt by the Legislature to extend the grounds upon which a meeting may be closed."

In 2012, the Great Falls Public Schools received a $10,000 "Graduation Matters" grant from the state Office of Public Instruction as part of a program to lower the city's dropout rate. The grant was the largest given to any school district by the state.

Tammy Lacey took over as school district superintendent on July 1, 2013. Lacey, who has a Master of Arts degree in educational leadership, is a graduate of Charles M. Russell High School. She was formerly a first grade teacher at Valley View Elementary School in Great Falls; principal at Fairfield Elementary School in Fairfield, Montana; and Human Resources Director for GFPS from 2007 to 2013. Lacey was also the first teacher in the GFPS school district to be appointed a Teacher on Special Assignment—in which a gifted teacher is removed from the classroom in order to develop good-teaching materials, and train and coach teachers into becoming better educators. Lacey's salary was $136,000 ($187,971 in 2025 dollars), and she was given a three-year contract. In January 2015, the GFPS school board extended Lacey's contract another three years.

=== 2016 bond issue ===
In May 2015, the GFPS school board began studying making major repairs and upgrades to all the school system buildings at a potential cost of more than $100 million. To accommodate increasing enrollment, Paris Gibson Education Center and West Elementary School might be turned back into middle schools. Other projects considered included upgrading the HVAC and drinking water/sewer systems at both high schools, adding an all-purpose fieldhouse to C.M. Russell High School, and replacing Longfellow Elementary School. The board also said it would also consider closing some schools.

After nearly 18 months of public discussions, plan revisions, and architectural planning, voters were asked to approve a $98 million, 20-year bond issue on October 4, 2016. The school district proposed to spend $20.8 million on infrastructure and $16.6 million on new construction at Great Falls High School; $4.4 million on infrastructure and $6.9 million on new construction at C.M. Russell High School; $3.4 million on infrastructure at Paris Gibson Education Center; $705,000 on improvements to Memorial Stadium; $12.7 million on infrastructure at 20 K-to-8th grade schools; $17.5 million razing the existing Lowell Elementary School and constructing a new Roosevelt Elementary School on the site; $15.2 rebuilding Longfellow Elementary School; and $1 million on phone system upgrades throughout the district. Voters were asked to approve one bond levy for the high schools, and another bond levy for the elementary and middle schools. A "Yes for Great Falls Kids Ballot Initiative Committee" was formed by the school district and parents to drum up support for the two bond issues. A voter-supported group, "Citizens for Better Schools", formed to oppose the bond issue. Voters approved the high school levy by 60.9 percent (11,341 to 7,187), and the elementary/middle school levy by 57.4 percent (10,680 to 7,919 votes).

== About the district ==
The Great Falls Public Schools is led by a seven-member board of trustees, which from among their members a chair and vice-chair. The Board has formed a number of committees—some of which include board members and many of which do not—which provide advice and expertise to the Board concerning school district operations. These include committees on: Budget, school year calendar, communication, curriculum, employee wellness, English as a second language instruction, curriculum implementation, insurance, labor-management relations, leadership team, staff development (PIR), staff development assessment (Professional Learning Community Time, or PLCT), safety, student wellness, superintendent's cabinet (an administrative leadership team), and technology. A superintendent (chief administrative and executive officer) is hired by the board and oversees daily operation of the school system and the implementation and assessment of board policies and decisions.

In 2009, the school district began facing major civil and criminal complaints about its treatment of special needs children. That year, Tifonie Schilling alleged that two special education paraprofessionals and a special education teacher at North Middle School had physically abused her son. (Note: The specific allegations included holding her son's head under a faucet of running water if he fell asleep in class or did not finish his schoolwork; forcing him to eat his own vomit if he vomited in class; and refusing to clean him and ridiculing him if he urinated or defecated in his pants.) An investigation by the Great Falls Public Schools supported one of three accusations made by Schilling. When news media reported the allegations, three other families made similar accusations of abuse to the Great Falls Police Department, but no charges came of them. The two paraprofessionals were charged in 2009 with felony assault of a minor and misdemeanor endangering the welfare of a child. No charges were filed against the teacher, as police found no evidence that she directly abused the child. Montana's Attorney General Steve Bullock declined to investigate the allegations, arguing that this was the province of city prosecutors and he would not second-guess them without clear evidence of abuse of prosecutorial discretion. He also contended that the allegations were a matter of professional ethics and district school policy, and should be handled administratively. Great Falls city prosecutors eventually agreed to defer charges against the two. In November 2011, several families of special needs children filed a lawsuit against the school district, alleging that GFPS knew the paraprofessionals were abusing children in February 2008 (a year before the Schilling case came to light). (Note: The lawsuit claimed that full-time and substitute paraprofessionals and teachers scratched, burned, and verbally abused special needs students. Several children had their heads held under running water for various infractions of rules, and others were locked in closets or forced to eat food with vomit.) GFPS settled out of court with seven families in November 2012, agreeing to pay a total of $595,000 to parents of children abused between 2007 and 2009. Meanwhile, in 2010, Schilling filed a $4 million discrimination claim against GFPS with the Montana Human Rights Commission. On May 19, 2011, the Human Rights Commission ordered the school district to pay $150,000 to Schilling for discriminating against her son based on his mental, physical, emotional, and developmental handicaps. GFPS sued to overturn the decision of the Montana Human Rights Commission, and as of September 2014 the appeal was still not resolved.

The Great Falls Public Schools spent $5,998 per pupil in the 2010–2011 school year, substantially less than the statewide average of $6,356 per pupil.

=== Current schools ===
As of the 2023–24 school year, the district operated the following public schools:

Pre-School

- ELF (Early Learning Family) Center at Skyline School (opened 1970)

Elementary schools

- Chief Joseph Elementary School (1962)
- Giant Springs Elementary School (opened 2017–2018)
- Lewis and Clark Elementary School (1953)
- Lincoln Elementary School (1951)
- Longfellow Elementary School (1952)
- Loy Elementary School (1963)
- Meadow Lark Elementary School (1960)
- Morningside Elementary School (1960)
- Mountain View Elementary School (1970)
- Riverview Elementary School (1960)
- Sacajawea Elementary School (1962)
- Sunnyside Elementary School (opened 1960)
- Valley View Elementary School (1960)
- West Elementary School (formerly West Junior High School; 1952)
- Whittier Elementary School (opened 1886; current building dates to 1938)

Middle schools

- East Middle School (opened fall 1958)
- North Middle School (1970)

High schools

- C.M. Russell High School (opened fall 1965)
- Great Falls High School (opened fall 1930)
- Paris Gibson Alternative High School (built 1950; opened fall 1975) (Note: Originally, this building was Great Falls Central High School, a Roman Catholic parochial school which opened in 1950. It closed in 1973, was purchased by GFPS and reopened in 1975.)

=== Former schools ===
Former schools (and their current uses as of 2024), include:

- Central High School (1400 1st Ave N) opened in 1896 and served as the main high school in Great Falls from 1896 to 1930, and as Paris Gibson Junior High from 1930 to 1975. Currently called Paris Gibson Square Museum of Art and is run by a nonprofit organization. (Note: In 1975, the Great Falls Public Schools signed an agreement in which Cascade County, Montana became a joint owner of the building. The Paris Gibson Square Museum of Art occupied the structure the following year, and continues to do so as of 2015.)
- McKinley Elementary School (1601 6th Avenue North) opened in 1906 and closed in 1979. (Note: The school district sold the building for $35,000 in 1985. As of 2015, Vineyard Christian Fellowship operates out of the building.)
- Hawthorne/Collins Elementary School (2000 Smelter Avenue NE in Black Eagle) opened in 1909 and closed in 1979. (Note: The school district sold the building for $34,500 to a private, nonprofit group called Citizens for a Moral Society in 1987. Immaculate Heart of Mary Catholic Church operates out of the building as of 2015.)
- Washington Elementary School (1015 1st Avenue North) opened in 1909 and closed in 1970. (Note: From 1970 to 1984, the school district used the building for administrative offices. It sold the building for $95,400 in 1984. As of 2015, it is used as an office building.)
- Franklin Elementary School (820 1st Avenue SW) opened in 1913 to serve Native American children and closed in 1979. (Note: The school district sold the building in 1990 to a private corporation, which converted it into the Franklin School Apartments.)
- Emerson Elementary School (1220 3rd Avenue South) opened in 1916 and closed in 1973. (Note: As of 2015, the school district leases the building to Opportunities Inc., which operates the federal Head Start Program from the building.)
- S.D. Largent Elementary School, originally Junior High School (915 1st Avenue South), was completed in 1918 and used as a junior high school, became an elementary school in 1930, and closed in 1973. (Note: As of 2015, the school district uses the building to house the district's Center for Mental Health.)
- Lowell Elementary School (3117 5th Avenue North) opened in 1939 and closed in 1979. (Note: As of 2015, the school district uses the building for offices and storage.)
- Roosevelt Elementary School (2501 2nd Ave N) opened in 1928 and closed in 2019.
- C.M. Russell Elementary School (Little Russell), formerly the Sun River Valley School (2615 Central Avenue West), opened in 1932 and closed in 1986. (Note: As of 2015, the school district uses the building for storage.)

== Great Falls Public Schools Foundation ==
The Great Falls Public Schools Foundation (GFPSF) was established in 2010 by the Great Falls Public Schools to act as the community recipient for donations made to the public school system. The foundation's goal is to establish a permanent fund that can support both the most disadvantaged and neediest students in the school system, as well as provide enhanced education, rewards, and opportunities for high-achieving students and educators.

In November 2016, the GFPSF received a $1 million from the Astrin family of Great Falls. Local physician Charles Astrin and his wife, Judy, made the bequest in memory of their daughter, Jennifer, a 1992 graduate of C.M. Russell High School who died in a vehicular accident in 1993. The Astrin donation established a $1,500-a-year higher education scholarship for a financially disadvantaged student at C.M. Russell High School, Great Falls High School, and Paris Gibson Education Center. Each scholarship is renewable for four years. The Astrin donation also funded a $10,000 annual grant to support students in dual-credit classes. The Astrin bequest was the largest donation the GFPSF history.

== Bibliography ==
- Robison, Ken. Cascade County and Great Falls. Mount Pleasant, S.C.: Arcadia Publishing, 2011.
- Small, Lawrence F. Religion in Montana: Pathways to the Present. Billings, Mont.: Rocky Mountain College, 1992.
- Superintendent of Public Instruction. Biennial Report of the Superintendent of Public Instruction. Vol. II. Montana Department of Public Instruction. Helena, Mont.: Independent Publishing Co., 1903.
- Yingst, Lonnie. "Better Decisions Without the Surprises: Communication as the Key to the Principal-Superintendent Relationship." In The Changing Relationship Between Principal and Superintendent: Shifting Roles in an Era of Educational Reform. Rebeca van der Bogert, ed. San Francisco: Jossey-Bass, 1999.
