= Fifteenth Street Bridge =

- Carries: vehicles
- Crosses: Missouri River
- Locale: Black Eagle, Montana
- Other name: Dr. Harry McGregor Bridge
- Owner: City of Great Falls

History
- Constructed by: Canton Bridge Co., Wrought Iron Bridge Co.
- Built: 1892
- Opened: 1892
- Rebuilt: 1924

Location
- Interactive map of Fifteenth Street Bridge

Fifteenth Street Bridge, also known as the Dr. Harry Mcgregor Bridge, is a deck truss bridge over the Missouri River near Black Eagle, Montana. The bridge was first built in 1892 and used for the Great Falls Street Railway. The bridge was later condemned and rebuilt in 1924 due to concerns about issues involving gas fumes resulting from the nearby Calumet refinery.

Later in the 1960s, the bridge was dedicated to Dr. Harry McGregor, a pioneer physician. Today, the bridge consists of the same infrastructure as it's 1924 remodel, but has taken small upgrades to make the bridge more accessible for vehicle traffic and slight improvements for astetics and safety.

== See also ==
- Great Falls, Montana
- Sun River
- Tenth Street Bridge
- Interstate 15
- Great Falls Flag Hill
- Black Eagle Dam
