= Kathleen Galvin-Halcro =

American politician (1949–2025)

Member of the Montana House of Representatives
- In office 1998–2006
- Preceded by: Patrick Galvin
- Succeeded by: Bill Thomas

Personal details
- Born: Kathleen M. Galvin; September 12, 1949 Great Falls, Montana, U.S.
- Died: July 9, 2025 (aged 75) Great Falls, Montana, U.S.
- Party: Democratic
- Children: Three daughters
- Education: Montana State University–Northern

Kathleen M. Galvin-Halcro (September 12, 1949 – July 9, 2025) was an American politician and educator who served in the Montana House of Representatives from 1998 until 2006, representing a district encompassing western Great Falls, Montana. In 1998, Galvin-Halcro was elected to succeed her father, retiring state Rep. Patrick Galvin, in the same legislative district, becoming the first daughter to succeed her father in the Montana House of Representatives.

== Life and career ==
Galvin-Halcro was born to Marie (née Gurnsey) and Patrick Glenn Galvin (1926–2004) on September 12, 1949, in Great Falls, Montana. Her father, a railroad worker and United States Marine Corps veteran, later served in the Montana House of Representatives from 1991 until 1998 and had a 22-mile stretch of Montana Highway 3 renamed as the "Patrick G. Galvin Memorial Highway" in his honor in 2005. She graduated from Great Falls Central Catholic High School.

She began working as a telephone operator and customer service representative at Mountain Bell in Great Falls and Helena in 1968. During this time, Galvin-Halcro became involved in the growth of unions in the telephone industry, becoming the first representative of the Communications Workers of America (CWA) in the state of Montana and the first female representative in the International Brotherhood of Electrical Workers (IBEW) labor union. Together with the Mountain Bell Pioneers organizations, Galvin-Halcro constructed the first information booth to open at the Montana State Fair in 1980.

Galvin-Halcro sought a career change and completed her Bachelor of Arts degree in interdisciplinary studies at Montana State University–Northern in 1993. She then worked as a teacher in the Great Falls Public Schools district for twenty-two years.

In 1998, her father, state. Rep. Pat Galvin declined to seek re-election to the Montana House of Representatives. Kathleen Galvin-Halcro, a Democrat, won the 1998 general election to succeed her father in the same Great Falls-based state house district. She served in the state house from 1998 until 2006.

In 2010, Galvin-Halcro campaigned for the Montana Senate in the 13th district, but was defeated by Republican Edward Buttrey, who won 58% of the vote.

Galvin-Halcro died at Peace Hospice in Great Falls, Montana, on July 9, 2025, at the age of 75.
