= Sun Prairie =

Sun Prairie is the name of various things in the United States:

- Sun Prairie, Montana, a census-designated place
- Sun Prairie, Wisconsin, a city
  - Sun Prairie High School
- Sun Prairie (town), Wisconsin
