= Ice Breaker Road Race =

The Ice Breaker Road Race, held annually in Great Falls, Montana in April of each year, is a road race that draws over 3,000 walkers, joggers and marathoners. The race was established in 1980 and has been run annually ever since.

Prizes are awarded between the top finishers in the 5-mile (TAC-RRCA Certified) and 3-mile races.
