= Holiday Village Mall =

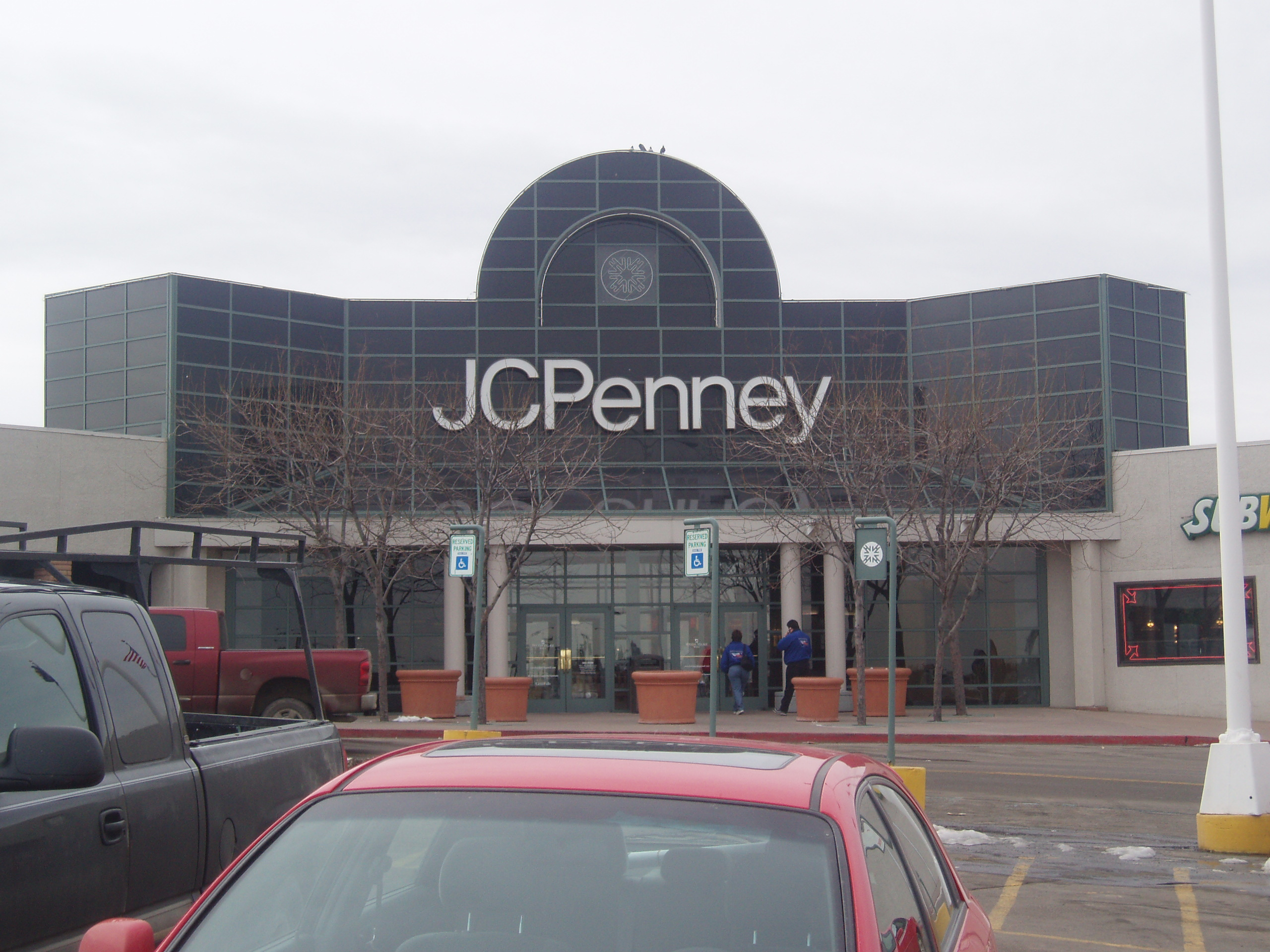
- Entrance to the mall and JCPenney in February 2007
- Location: Great Falls, Montana, United States
- Coordinates: 47°29′34″N 111°17′23″W
- Opened: November 1959
- Developer: Don F. Robinson; Theodore J. Mitchell; John T. Mitchell
- Owner: GK Development
- Num. of stores: 35
- Num. of anchor tenants: 8
- Floor area: 576,897 square feet (53,595.5 m^{2})
- Floors: 2
- Website: holidayvillagemall.com

Holiday Village Mall is a two leveled shopping mall located in Great Falls, Montana, United States. The shopping center opened in November 1959 with Albertsons as an anchor store. The mall was expanded into an enclosed shopping mall between 1962 and 1967. Today, the mall is anchored by Harbor Freight Tools, Hobby Lobby, JCPenney, PetSmart, Ross Dress for Less, and Scheels.

== History ==
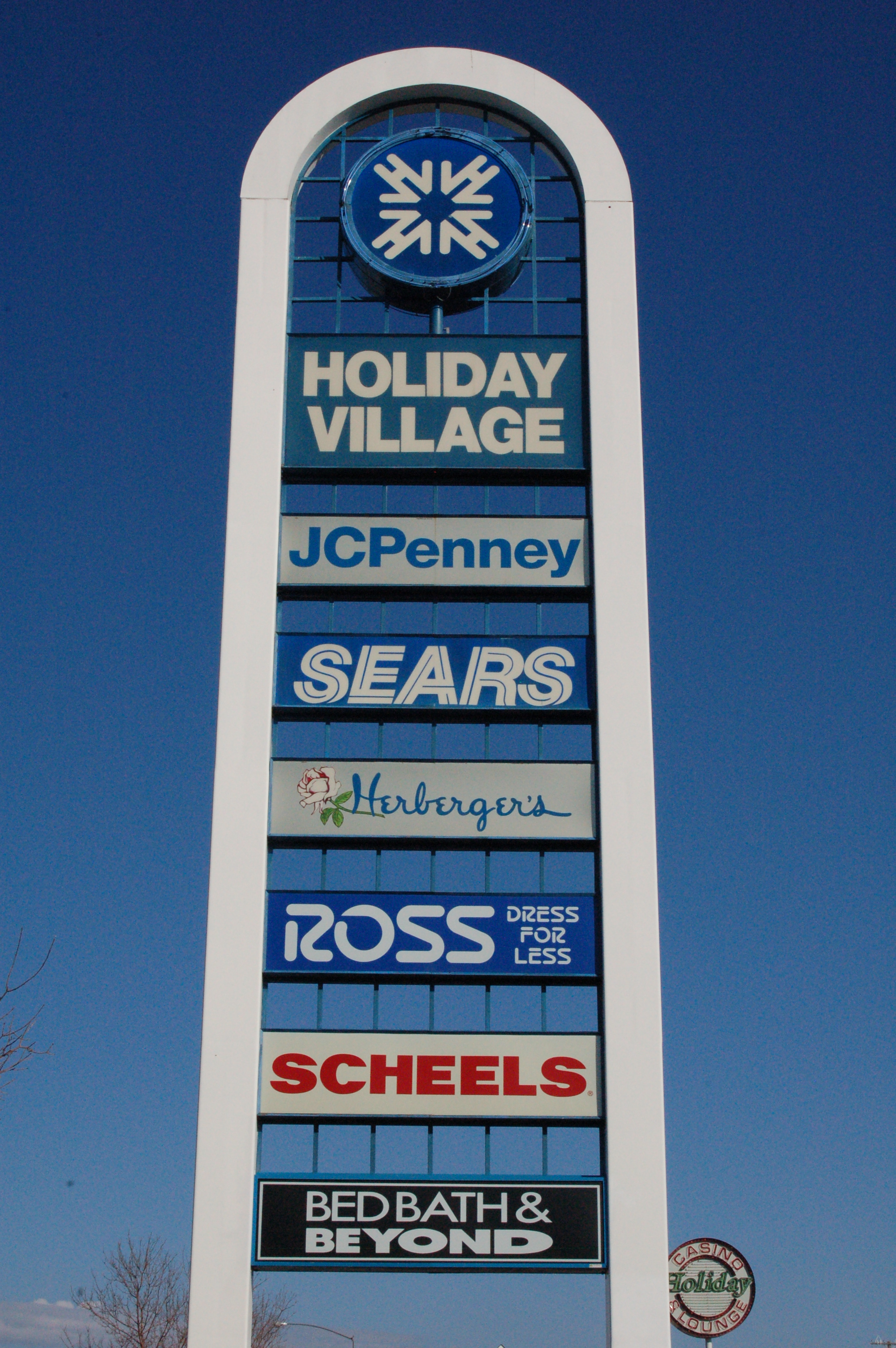
Holiday Village Mall sign in 2010, before closure of Sears and Herberger's

=== Opening and expansions ===
The idea of the Holiday Village Mall was conceived in 1956 by owners Don F. Robinson, Theodore J. Mitchell and John T. Mitchell. The first store in the shopping center, an Albertsons food and drug store, opened for business in November 1959. The shopping center's formal grand opening was held in January 1960. Among the first stores in the 100,000 square-foot center were Hesteds, Rosana, Kops Music Mart, and Holiday Jewelry and Gifts.

The first expansion of the shopping center, completed in September 1962, added an enclosed wing with several new shops and a 4B's buffet-style restaurant. Another addition, a larger Hesteds department store, opened in November 1962. Skaggs Drug Centers acquired the Albertsons pharmacy in July 1963.

Ground was broken for another expansion of the mall in February 1966. The new expansion, which was completed in September, included a Montgomery Ward department store and service center. A third expansion of the mall was constructed in 1967. This expansion included the addition of a Buttrey-Osco food and drug store and a first-run, 796-seat movie theater. The opening of the new section was briefly delayed after a fire caused damage to the new Buttrey-Osco store. In July 1969, a Buttreys Suburban department store opened at the mall.

=== Anchor changes ===
In November 1975, Hesteds announced its plans to close by the end of the year. Four months later, Buttreys Suburban announced plans to close as well. By the end of the year, the former Hesteds space was sold to Herberger's, while J. C. Penney moved into the former Buttreys Suburban space. In 1979, Holiday Village Mall was acquired by Macerich, which renovated the mall the same year.

Following the merger of American Stores and Jewel Companies, Skaggs Drug Centers was rebranded as Osco Drug in February 1985. The Fox Holiday Theater was closed in January 1989 and demolished in October 1990 for additional parking. In November 1989, Buttrey-Osco announced it would close its store in early 1990. In August 1990, after months of speculation, Sears confirmed plans to close its downtown Great Falls store and relocate to the site of the former Buttrey-Osco store in late fall 1991. During 1991, Herberger's expanded its store after acquiring 8,500 square-feet of space on the mall's lower-level from Big Bear Sports Centers.

In January 1999, Montgomery Ward announced it would close its store after 33 years at the mall and 70 years in Great Falls. Shortly after the announcement, The Bon Marché, which had recently closed its downtown Great Falls store, announced it was considering opening in the vacant Wards space. In August, Albertsons, the mall's first tenant, announced it would close at the end of October.

In March 2000, Herberger's announced it would move from its current store into the empty Montgomery Ward space. In December 2001, Osco Drug announced it would move from its current space to a free-standing location on the site of the former Montgomery Ward auto center. However, Osco Drug officials later scrapped their plans. Ross Dress for Less announced plans to open a store in the vacant Albertsons space in March 2005. After numerous delays, the store was finally opened in April 2007.

=== Changes since 2005 ===
In November 2005, Scheels, which has operated in the mall since 1968, announced plans build a larger store on the site of the former Herberger's building. Plans were later changed to remodel the vacant space, instead of the demolishing the vacant building. After much anticipation, Scheels opened its new store in February 2007. The empty Scheels space was quickly filled by Bed Bath & Beyond in October 2007.

In July 2006, Macerich sold the shopping center to GK Development.

In 2009, CVS Pharmacy, which acquired Osco Drug from Albertsons in 2005, closed its store after a new free-standing location was built nearby. The old CVS store was replaced by Big Lots in November 2011. Sears announced the closure of its store in September 2014. A Sears Hometown Store was opened in the mall in November 2015 but closed in 2018.

Hobby Lobby and PetSmart moved into the vacant Sears space in early 2017. In April 2018, Herberger's parent company The Bon-Ton announced it will liquidate and close all 267 stores. A Harbor Freight Tools store was added to a portion of the former Herberger's building in January 2019.

In January 2023, Bed Bath & Beyond announced the store at the mall will close in March.

In August 2024, Big Lots announced the closure of the store at the mall.
