= Bill Thomas (Montana politician) =

American politician

Member of the Montana House of Representatives from the 26th district
- In office 2007 -
- Preceded by: Kathleen Galvin-Halcro

Personal details
- Born: November 9, 1935 (age 90) Missoula, Montana
- Party: Democratic Party
- Spouse: Janet
- Education: Montana State University-Bozeman, Northwestern University School of Dentistry
- Profession: dentist

Bill Thomas is a Democratic Party member of the Montana House of Representatives, representing District 26 since 2007. He previously served from 1997 through 2004.
