= Charles M. Russell High School =

Public school in Great Falls, Montana, United States

Coordinates: 47°31′19″N 111°19′7″W

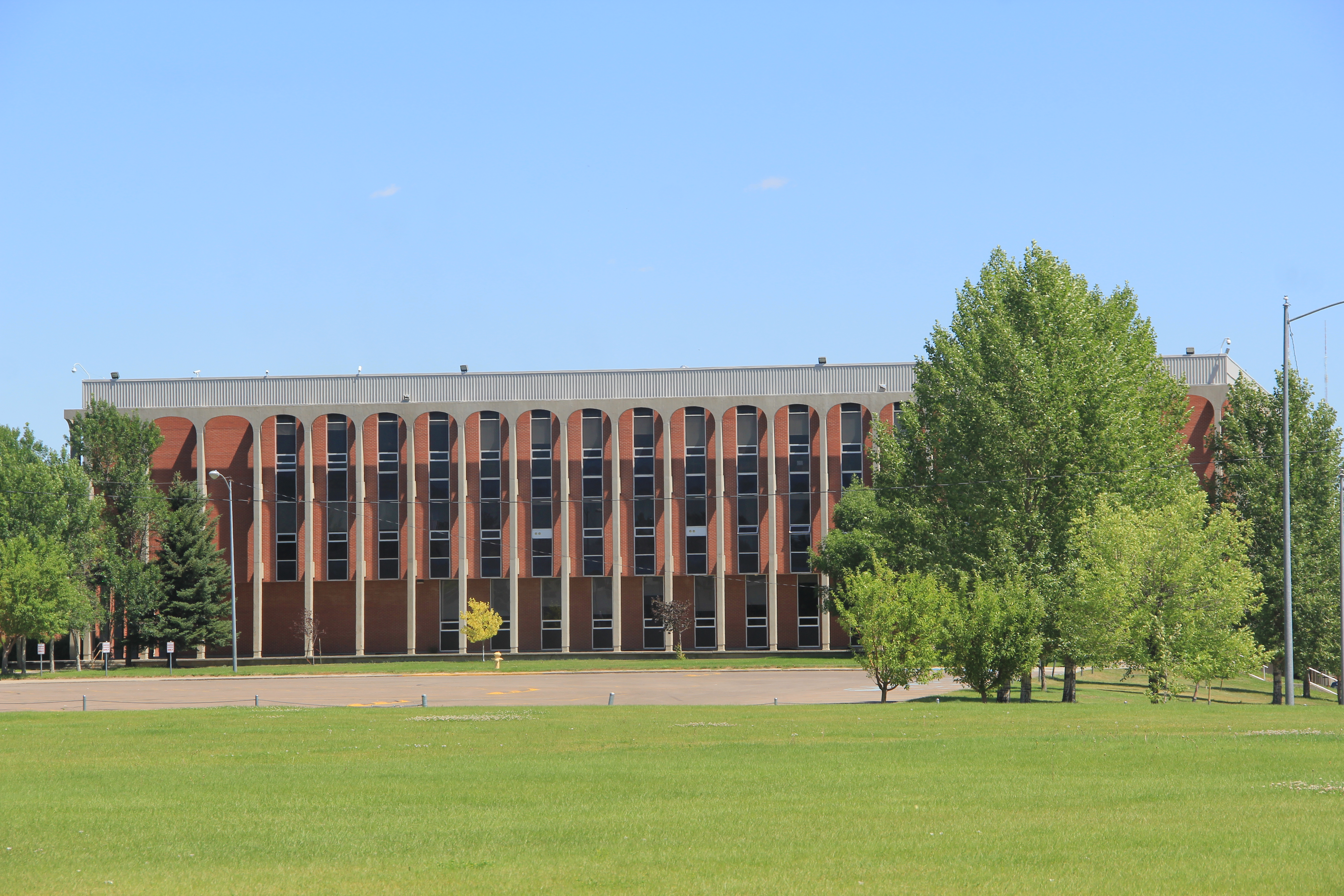

Location
- 228 17th Avenue Northwest; Great Falls, Montana; United States

Information
- Type: Public secondary
- Established: 1965
- School district: Great Falls Public Schools
- Principal: Jamie McGraw
- Teaching staff: 86.26 (FTE)
- Grades: 9-12
- Enrollment: 1,452 (2023-2024)
- Student to teacher ratio: 16.83
- Colors: Green and gold
- Mascot: The Rustler
- Nickname: Rustlers
- Rival: Great Falls High School
- Yearbook: Russellog
- Website: cmrhs.gfps.k12.mt.us

Charles M. Russell High School (also known as CMR) is a public high school in Great Falls, Montana, in the United States. It is part of the Great Falls Public Schools system. It is one of two public high schools in the city, the other being Great Falls High School. The school opened on September 7, 1965, with about 1,400 students. The school had about 1,515 students enrolled in the 2011–2012 school year. CMR was opened in 1965 and the Rustlers have won 13 Montana state AA football championships, the most of any school in that time period.

== Notable alumni ==
Among its notable alumni are:

=== Politicians ===
- Scyller Borglum, former member of the South Dakota House of Representatives
- Melony G. Griffith, former member of the Maryland Senate
- Albert Olszewski, former member of the Montana Senate

=== Athletes ===
- Dave Dickenson, University of Montana-Missoula and Canadian Football League (CFL) player
- Patrick Dwyer, former NHL player
- Todd Foster, Olympic boxer
- Tyler Graham, San Francisco Giants and Arizona Diamondbacks professional baseball outfielder
- Michael Howard, award-winning actor, writer, and filmmaker.
- Josh Huestis, former NBA player
- Ryan Leaf, former NFL quarterback
