= Ulm, Montana =

- CDP
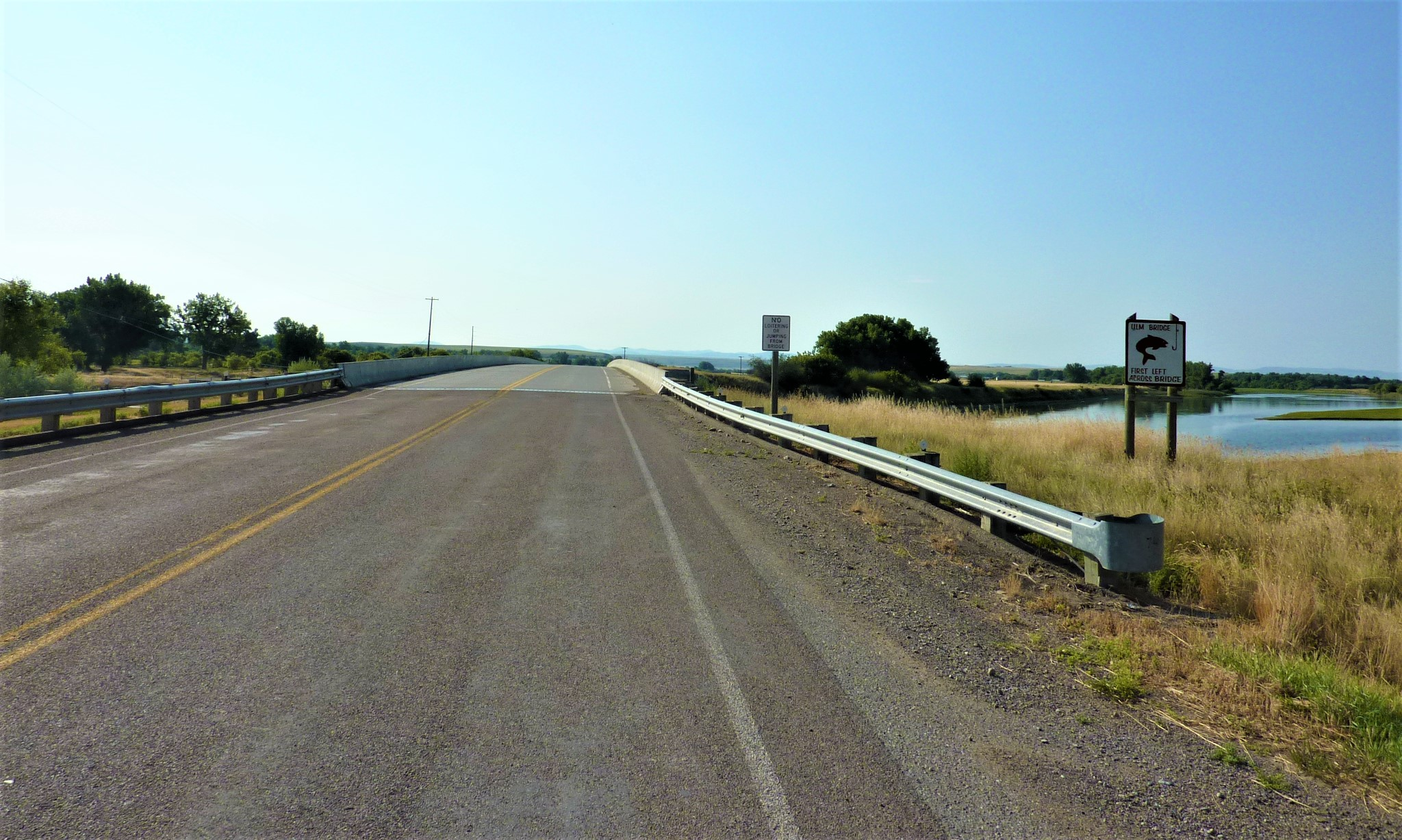
- Ulm Bridge

- Location of Ulm, Montana
- Coordinates: 47°25′12″N 111°31′35″W
- Country: United States
- State: Montana
- County: Cascade

Area
  - Total: 20.83 sq mi (53.96 km^{2})
  - Land: 20.26 sq mi (52.48 km^{2})
  - Water: 0.57 sq mi (1.47 km^{2})
- Elevation: 3,337 ft (1,017 m)

Population (2020)
  - Total: 723
  - Density: 35.7/sq mi (13.78/km^{2})
- Time zone: UTC-7 (Mountain (MST))
  - Summer (DST): UTC-6 (MDT)
- ZIP code: 59485
- Area code: 406
- FIPS code: 30-75775
- GNIS feature ID: 2409378

Ulm is a census-designated place (CDP) in Cascade County, Montana, United States. It was originally a large ranch owned by Indiana-born cattleman William Ulm. As of the 2020 census, Ulm had a population of 723. It is part of the Great Falls, Montana Metropolitan Statistical Area.

The post office opened in 1883. In 1887, Ulm became a stop on the Montana Central Railway. A bridge across the Missouri River was built in 1914.

== Geography ==
Interstate 15 passes through the community, with access from Exit 270. The town is situated along the Missouri River.

According to the United States Census Bureau, the CDP has a total area of 20.8 square miles (53.9 km^{2}), of which 20.2 square miles (52.2 km^{2}) is land and 0.66 square miles (1.7 km^{2}), or 3.07%, is water.

=== Climate ===
According to the Köppen Climate Classification system, Ulm has a semi-arid climate, abbreviated "BSk" on climate maps.

== Demographics ==
Historical population
Census	Pop.	Note	%±
2020	723		—
U.S. Decennial Census

As of the census of 2000, there were 750 people, 254 households, and 210 families residing in the CDP. The population density was 37.3 inhabitants per square mile (14.4/km^{2}). There were 267 housing units at an average density of 13.3 per square mile (5.1/km^{2}). The racial makeup of the CDP was 98.00% White, 0.93% Native American, 0.13% Asian, 0.27% from other races, and 0.67% from two or more races. Hispanic or Latino of any race were 1.07% of the population.

There were 254 households, out of which 43.3% had children under the age of 18 living with them, 71.3% were married couples living together, 7.9% had a female householder with no husband present, and 17.3% were non-families. 16.1% of all households were made up of individuals, and 3.5% had someone living alone who was 65 years of age or older. The average household size was 2.95 and the average family size was 3.30.

In the CDP, the population was spread out, with 31.7% under the age of 18, 7.3% from 18 to 24, 26.8% from 25 to 44, 26.3% from 45 to 64, and 7.9% who were 65 years of age or older. The median age was 36 years. For every 100 females, there were 104.9 males. For every 100 females age 18 and over, there were 101.6 males.

The median income for a household in the CDP was $40,795, and the median income for a family was $41,705. Males had a median income of $32,279 versus $22,045 for females. The per capita income for the CDP was $14,602. About 12.3% of families and 17.8% of the population were below the poverty line, including 21.8% of those under age 18 and 3.3% of those age 65 or over.

== Education ==
Headquartered in Cascade, Cascade Public Schools educates students from kindergarten through 12th grade. It also serves the nearby towns of Deep Creek, Craig, and Wolf Creek.

== Media ==
The Cascade Courier is a local newspaper. It is printed weekly and is also available online.
