= Great Falls, Montana =

City and county seat in Montana, US

Great Falls
- City
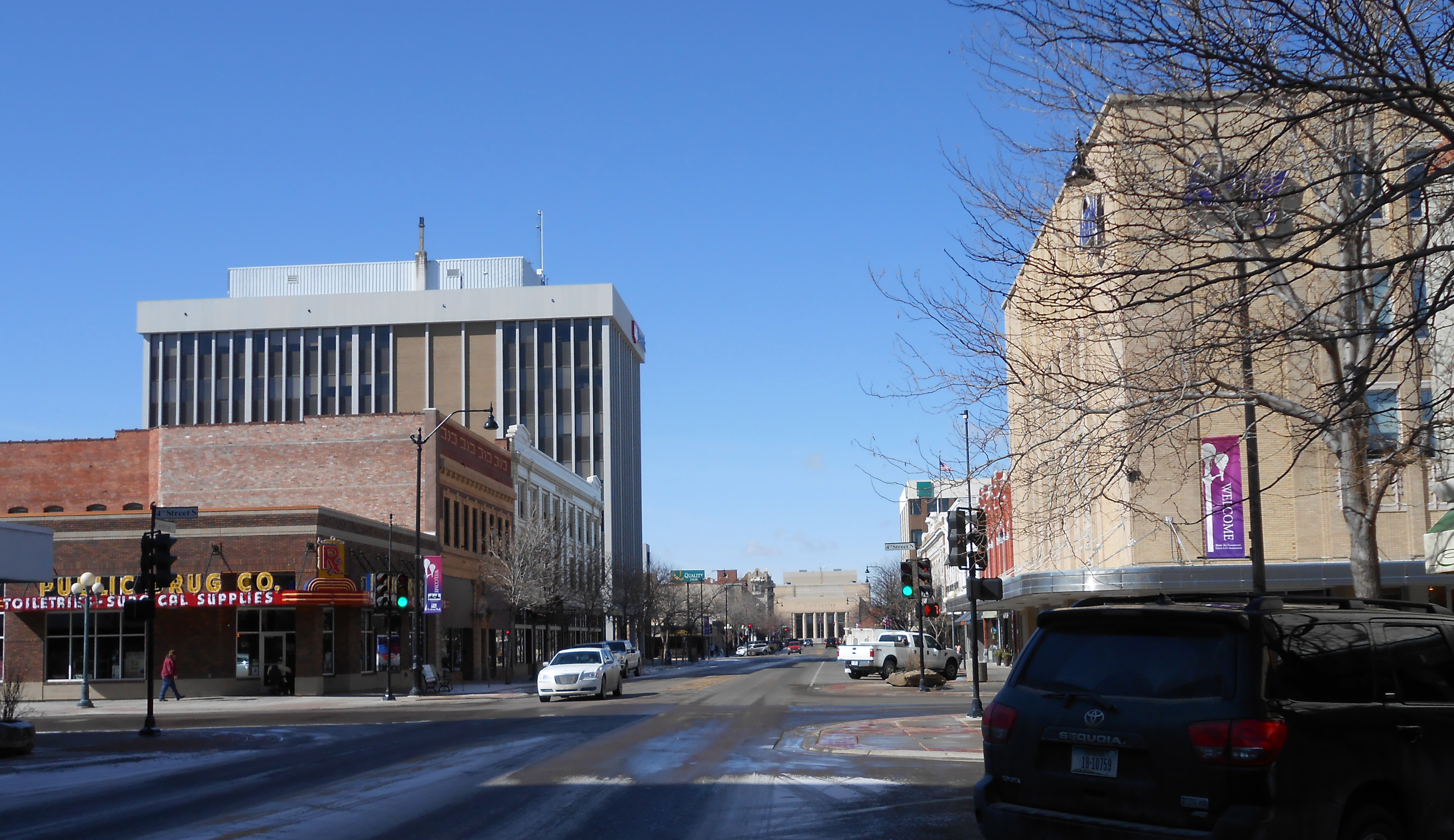
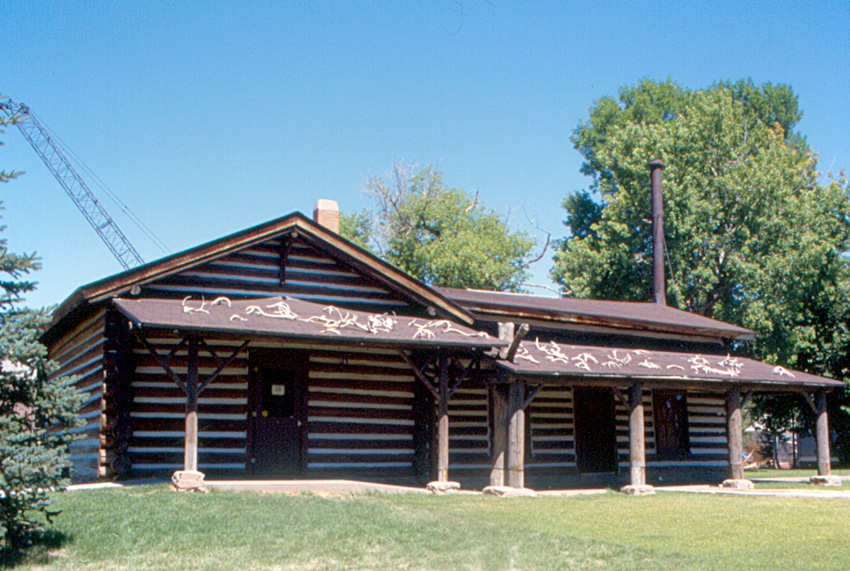
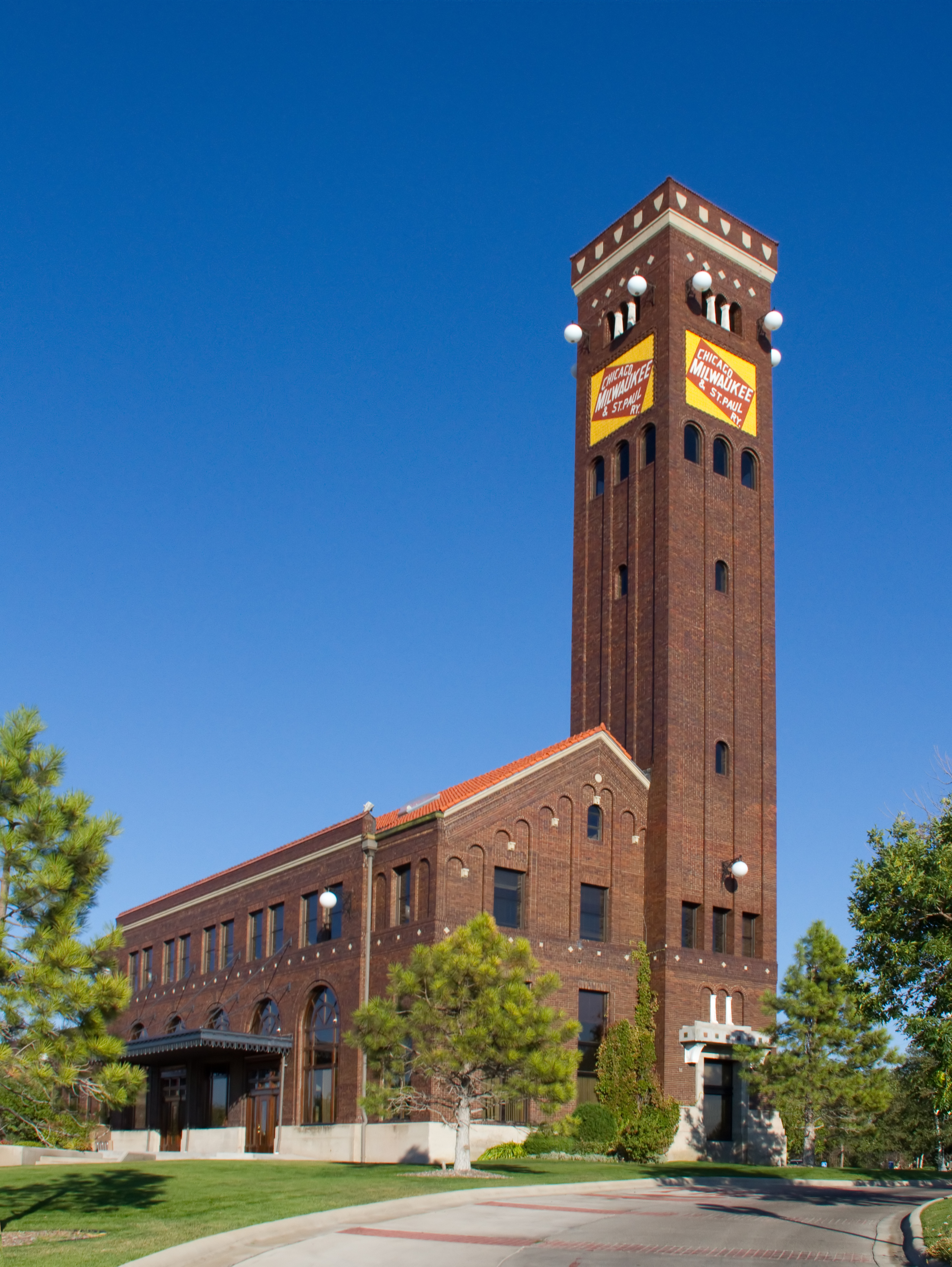
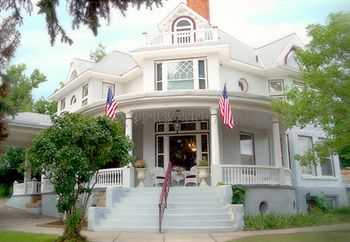
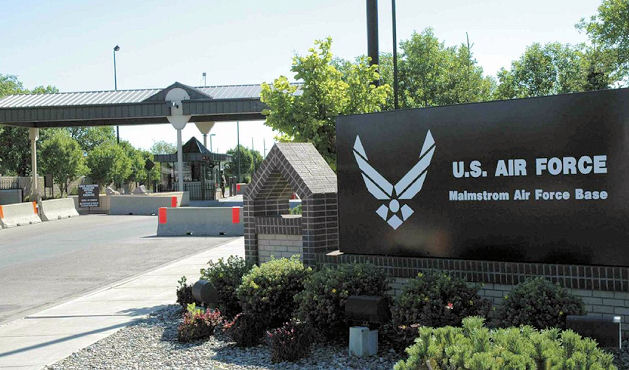
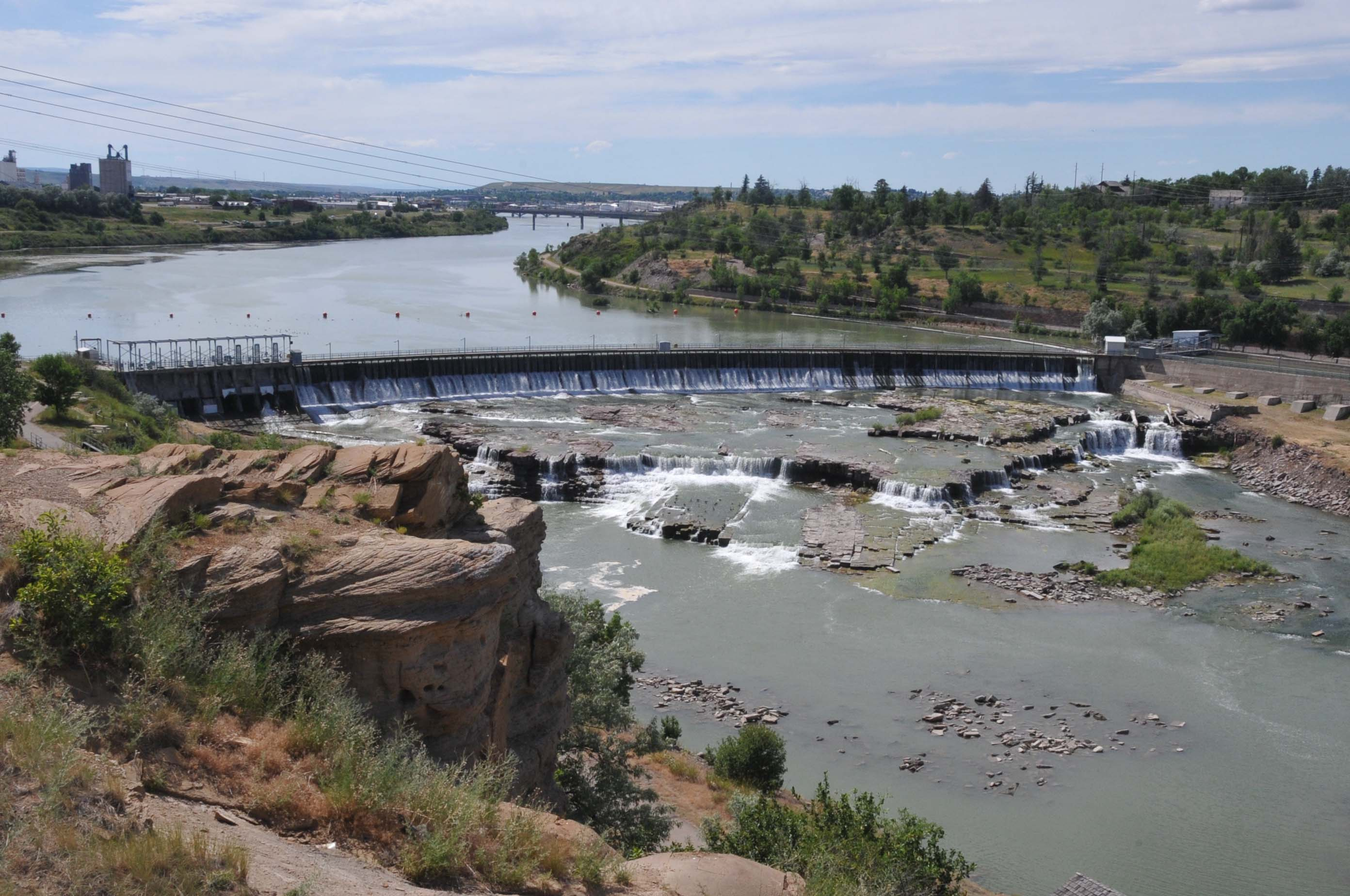
- Downtown Great Falls Charles M. Russell Museum Great Falls Station Collins Mansion Malmstrom Air Force Base Black Eagle Falls

- Flag Seal Logo
- Nicknames: "The Electric City", "The River City", "The Western Art Capital of The World"
- Location within Cascade County and Montana

- Location in the U.S.
- Coordinates: 47°29′30″N 111°17′21″W
- Country: United States
- State: Montana
- County: Cascade
- Founded: 1888
- Named for: Great Falls of the Missouri River

Government
  - Type: Mayor–Council
  - Mayor: Cory Reeves

Area
  - City: 23.59 sq mi (61.10 km^{2})
  - Land: 23.11 sq mi (59.86 km^{2})
  - Water: 0.48 sq mi (1.24 km^{2})
- Elevation: 3,333 ft (1,016 m)

Population (2020)
  - City: 60,442
  - Rank: US: 617th
  - Density: 2,615.1/sq mi (1,009.69/km^{2})
  - Metro: 84,414 (US: 371st)
- Time zone: UTC−7 (MST)
  - Summer (DST): UTC−6 (MDT)
- ZIP Codes: 59401-59406
- Area code: 406
- FIPS code: 30-32800
- GNIS ID: 2410653
- Website: greatfallsmt.gov

Great Falls is the third most populous city in the U.S. state of Montana and the county seat of Cascade County. The population was 60,442 according to the 2020 census. The city covers an area of 22.9 square miles (59 km^{2}) and is the principal city of the Great Falls, Montana, Metropolitan Statistical Area, which encompasses all of Cascade County. The Great Falls MSA's population was 84,414 according to the 2020 census.

A cultural, commercial and financial center in the central part of the state, Great Falls is located just east of the Rocky Mountains and is bisected by the Missouri River. It is 180 miles (290 km) from the eastern entrance to Glacier National Park in northern Montana, and 264 miles (425 km) from Yellowstone National Park in southern Montana and northern Wyoming. Interstate 15, which runs north-south, services the city.

Great Falls is named for a series of five waterfalls located on the Missouri River north and east of the city. The Lewis and Clark Expedition of 1805–1806 was forced to portage around a 10-mile (16 km) stretch of the river in order to bypass the falls; the company spent 31 days in the area, performing arduous labor to make the portage. Three of the waterfalls, known as Black Eagle, Rainbow and the Great Falls (or the Big Falls), are among the sites of five hydroelectric dams in the area, giving the city its moniker, "The Electric City". Other nicknames for Great Falls include "The River City" and "Western Art Capital of the World". The city is also home to two military installations: Malmstrom Air Force Base east of the city, which is the community's largest employer; and the Montana Air National Guard to the west, adjacent to Great Falls International Airport. The federally recognized Little Shell Tribe of Chippewa Indians of Montana are located in Great Falls.

Great Falls is a popular tourist destination in Montana, with one million overnight visitors annually, who spend an estimated $185 million while visiting, according to the Great Falls Montana Tourism group. Among Montana cities, Great Falls boasts the greatest number of museums, with 10, including the Lewis and Clark Interpretive Center near Giant Springs and the C. M. Russell Museum and Original Log Cabin Studio on the city's north side. Great Falls was the largest city in Montana from 1951 to 1970, when it was eclipsed by Billings in the 1970 census; Missoula assumed second place in 2000.

== History ==
For much of prehistory, no permanent settlements existed at or near Great Falls, though Salish Indians seasonally hunted bison in the region. Around 1600, Piegan Blackfeet Indians, migrating west, entered the area, pushing the Salish back into the Rocky Mountains and claiming the area now occupied by Great Falls. The area remained territory of the Blackfeet until long after the United States claimed the region in 1803 as part of the Louisiana Purchase.

Meriwether Lewis and William Clark led the Lewis and Clark Expedition into the newly purchased territory from 1804 to 1806. The expedition came upon the "Great Falls of the Missouri River" on June 13, 1805.

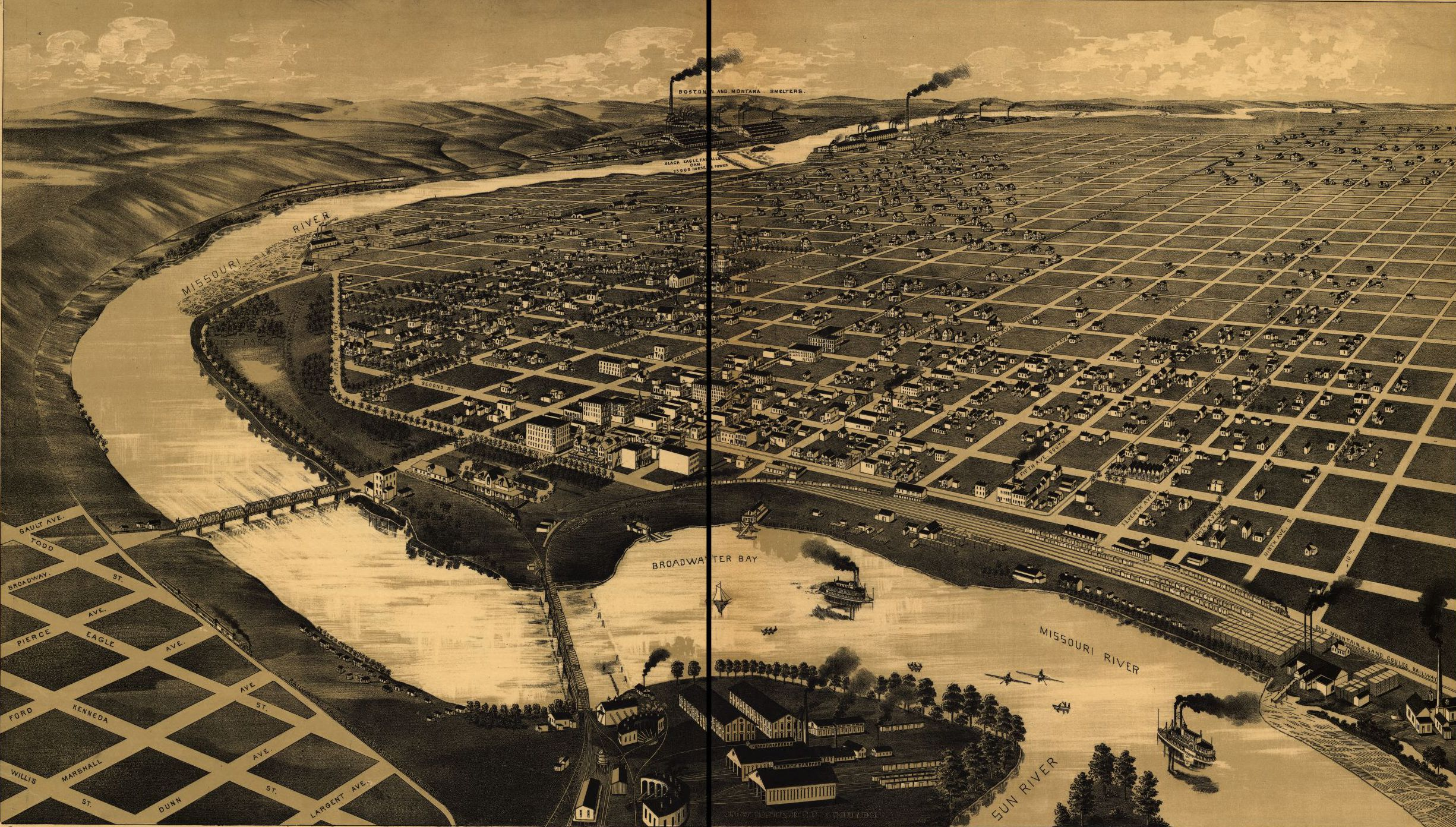
1891 bird's-eye illustration of Great Falls

Politically, the future site of Great Falls passed through numerous hands in the 19th century. It was part of the unincorporated frontier until May 30, 1854, when Congress established the Nebraska Territory. On March 2, 1861, the site became part of the Dakota Territory. The Great Falls area was incorporated into the Idaho Territory on March 4, 1863, and then into the Montana Territory on May 28, 1864. It became part of the state of Montana upon that territory's admission to statehood on November 8, 1889.

=== Founding and early years ===
The founding of Great Falls was the brainchild of Paris Gibson, a Maine-born entrepreneur who became acquainted with railroad magnate James J. Hill in Minneapolis, Minnesota. By the 1880s, Gibson was a sheep man in Fort Benton, Montana. He visited the Great Falls of the Missouri River in 1880 and was deeply impressed by the possibilities for building a major industrial city near the falls with power provided by hydroelectricity. He returned in 1883 with friend Robert Vaughn and some surveyors and platted a permanent settlement on the south side of the river. The city's first citizen, Silas Beachley, arrived later that year. With investments from Hill and from Helena businessman Charles Arthur Broadwater, houses, a store, and a flour mill were established in 1884. The Great Falls post office was established on July 10, 1884, and Gibson was named the first postmaster. A planing mill, lumber yard, bank, school, and newspaper were established in 1885. By 1887 the town had 1,200 citizens, and the arrival of Hill's Great Northern Railway in October of that year helped cement the city's future. Great Falls was incorporated on November 28, 1888.

Great Falls quickly became a thriving industrial and supply center. A ground-breaking for a smelter in nearby Black Eagle took place in 1890, the same year that construction of a hydroelectric dam atop Black Eagle Falls was completed. The dam provided the fledgling city with electricity and marked the first major instance of hydroelectric power in Montana. In 1894, naturalist Vernon Bailey passed through and described Great Falls as "a very good town, appears prosperous and booming & I should judge contains 15000 inhabitants". By the early 1900s, Great Falls was en route to becoming one of Montana's largest cities. The rustic studio of famed Western artist Charles Marion Russell was a popular attraction, as were the famed Great Falls of the Missouri.

Among structures built in the early years were the sandstone Central High School (completed in 1896), now the Paris Gibson Square Museum of Art; the ornate copper-domed Cascade County Courthouse (1903); and railroad passenger depots of the Great Northern Railway (1909) and the Milwaukee Road (1915), both overlooking the Missouri River.

=== Railroad and hydroelectric expansion ===
James Jerome Hill, president and primary stockholder of the Great Northern Railway, established a subsidiary, the Montana Central Railway, on January 25, 1886. The mines in Butte were eager to get their metals to market. Gold and silver had been discovered near Helena, and coal companies in Canada sought to transport their fuel to Montana's smelters. Hill's close friend and business associate, Paris Gibson, promoted Great Falls as a site for the development of cheap hydroelectricity and heavy industry. As Hill was building the Great Northern across the northern tier of Montana, it made sense to also build a north–south railroad through central Montana to connect Great Falls with Helena and Butte. Surveyors and engineers had begun grading a route between Helena and Great Falls in the winter of 1885–1886, and by the end of 1886 had surveyed a route from Helena to Butte.

Construction on the Great Northern's line westward began in late 1886, and on October 16, 1887, the link between Devils Lake, North Dakota, Fort Assinniboine (near the present-day city of Havre, Montana), and Great Falls was complete. Service to Helena began in November 1887, and Butte followed on November 10, 1888.

Hill organized the Great Falls Water Power & Townsite Company in 1887, with the goal of developing the town of Great Falls; providing it with power, sewage, and water; and attracting commerce and industry to the city. To attract industry to the new city, he offered low rates on the Montana Central Railway. On September 12, 1889, the Boston and Montana ("B & M") signed an agreement with Great Falls Water Power & Townsite Company in which the power company agreed to build a dam that would supply the mining firm with at least 1,000 horsepower (or 0.75 MW) of power by September 1, 1890, and 5,000 horsepower (or 3.73 MW) of power by January 1, 1891. In exchange, B & M agreed to build a $300,000 copper smelter near the dam. Black Eagle Dam began generating electricity in December 1890. Water was permitted to flow over the crest of the dam on January 6, 1891, and the dam was considered complete on March 15, 1891. By 1912, Rainbow Dam and Volta Dam (now Ryan Dam) were all operating. Morony Dam was built in 1930 and Cochrane Dam in 1957–1958.

==== Smelting operations ====
On April 7, 1908, construction began on a masonry/brick chimney measuring 506 feet (154 m) tall on the B & M's (now the city's largest employer) smelting site at Black Eagle by the Alphonse Custodis Construction Co. of New York, for dispersal of fumes from B & M's copper smelting process. B & M would soon merge with the Amalgamated Copper Company and become the Anaconda Copper Mining Company or "ACM". The B & M smelter stack was completed on October 23, 1908. The chimney had an interior measurement of 78.5 feet (23.9 m) in diameter at the base and fifty feet (15 m) in diameter at the top. At the time of its completion, it was the tallest chimney in the world (see List of tallest chimneys). With the moniker "The Big Stack", it immediately became a landmark for the community; after over 70 years of operation, the smelter closed in 1980.

The Big Stack's "sister" stack in Anaconda, also of masonry/brick construction, completed in 1919, and slightly taller at 585 feet (178 m), began to suffer from cracking and the ACM decided to remove the support bands from the upper half of the Big Stack in 1976 and send them to Anaconda. This action proved to be the Big Stack's ultimate demise, since the cracks it was also suffering from rapidly worsened such that the ACM, citing concern for public safety (due to the continual deterioration of the stack's structural integrity), slated the Big Stack's demolition for September 18, 1982.

In an interesting twist of fate, the demolition crew failed to accomplish the task on the first try; the two worst cracks in the stack ran from just above ground level to nearly 300 feet (90 m) up. The demolition team's intent was to create a wedge in the base so the stack's rubble would fall almost vertically into a large trench, but as the 600 lb (270 kg) of explosives were set off the cracks "completed themselves" all the way to the ground—effectively severing the stack into two-thirds and one-third pieces. Much to the delight of the spectating community, the smaller of the two pieces remained standing, but the failed demolition only solidified the safety issue whereas the community cited the event as the stack's defiance. The demolition team who had planted the charges was recalled and later the same afternoon they returned and finished the demolition, after packing another 400 lb (180 kg) of explosives into the smaller wedge.

=== 1930–present ===
During the first two decades of the 20th century, Great Falls prospered from a homesteading boom, strong agricultural markets and favorable weather. It also became a financial center and regional shopping hub. In the late 1930s, the federal government's New Deal programs provided Great Falls with a new Civic Center building, and the city's business sector expanded with the arrival of military installations during World War II, helping Great Falls become the state's largest city from 1950 to 1970. During World War II, the Northwest Staging Route passed through Great Falls, along which planes were delivered to the USSR according to the Lend-Lease program. Great Falls prospered further with the opening of a nearby military base in the 1940s, but as rail transportation and freight slowed in the later part of the century, outlying farming areas lost population, and with the closure of the smelter and cutbacks at Malmstrom Air Force Base in the 1980s, its population growth slowed.

Great Falls was the location of the Mariana UFO incident in 1950, one of the earliest widely publicized UFO incidents.

On February 11, 2013, the residents of Great Falls were met with a false Emergency Alert System message during an afternoon broadcast of The Steve Wilkos Show on CBS affiliate television station KRTV, which simply stated that "the bodies of the dead are rising from their graves and attacking the living. Do not attempt to approach these bodies, as they are considered extremely dangerous." It was revealed that a default password for the networks was being used, and a few minutes later, the station sent an official on-screen message apologizing for any confusion.

In recent years, the economy of Great Falls has suffered from the decline of heartland industry, much like other cities in the Great Plains and Midwest.

== Geography ==
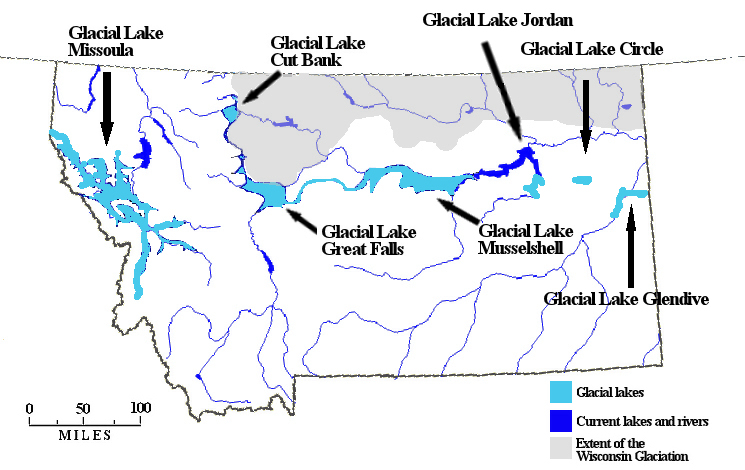
Map of Montana showing Glacial Lake Great Falls

Great Falls is located near several waterfalls on the Missouri River. It lies near the center of Montana on the northern Great Plains. It lies next to the Rocky Mountain Front and is approximately 100 miles (160 km) south of the Canada–US border. According to the United States Census Bureau, the city has a total area of 22.26 square miles (57.65 km^{2}), of which 21.79 square miles (56.44 km^{2}) is land and 0.47 square miles (1.22 km^{2}) is water.

=== Geology ===
The city of Great Falls lies atop the Great Falls Tectonic Zone, an intracontinental shear zone between two geologic provinces of basement rock of the Archean period which form part of the North American continent. The city lies at the southern reach of the Laurentide Ice Sheet, a vast glacial sheet of ice which covered much of North America during the last glacial period. Approximately 1.5 million years ago, the Missouri River flowed northward into a terminal lake. The Laurentide Ice Sheet pushed the river southward. Between 15,000 BCE and 11,000 BCE, the Laurentide Ice Sheet blocked the Missouri River and created Glacial Lake Great Falls. About 13,000 BCE, as the glacier retreated, Glacial Lake Great Falls emptied catastrophically in a glacial lake outburst flood. The current course of the Missouri River essentially marks the southern boundary of the Laurentide Ice Sheet. The Missouri River flowed eastward around the glacial mass, settling into its present course. As the ice retreated, meltwater from Glacial Lake Great Falls poured through the Highwood Mountains and eroded the mile-long, 500-foot-deep (150 m) Shonkin Sag, one of the most famous prehistoric meltwater channels in the world.

=== Climate ===
Great Falls has a cold semi-arid climate (Köppen: BSk), with a notable amount of summer precipitation occurring in the form of thunderstorms. Winters are very cold, long and often snowy, though periods of chinook winds do cause warm spells and raise the maximum temperature above 50 °F or 10 °C on an average of fifteen afternoons during the three-month winter period. In the absence of such winds, shallow cold snaps are common; there is an average of 20.8 nights with a low of 0 °F (−17.8 °C) or colder and 44 days failing to top freezing. The wettest part of the year is the spring. Summers are hot and dry, with highs reaching 90 °F (32.2 °C) on nineteen days per year, though the diurnal temperature variation is large and easily exceeds 30 °F (16.7 °C). Freak early and late summer snowfalls such as a two-day total of 8.3 in (0.21 m) in August 1992 can occur, although the median snowfall from June to September is zero and on average the window for accumulating (0.1 in or 0.25 cm) snowfall is October 2–May 13. The average first and last freeze dates are September 21 and May 21, respectively, allowing a growing season of 122 days, although, excepting for July, a freeze has occurred in every month of the year. Extreme temperatures range from −49 °F (−45.0 °C) on February 15, 1936, to 107 °F (41.7 °C) on July 25, 1933.

Climate data for Great Falls, Montana (Great Falls Int'l), 1991–2020 normals, (Note: Mean monthly maxima and minima (i.e. the expected highest and lowest temperature readings at any point during the year or given month) calculated based on data at said location from 1991 to 2020.) extremes 1891–present
Month	Jan	Feb	Mar	Apr	May	Jun	Jul	Aug	Sep	Oct	Nov	Dec	Year
Record high °F (°C)	67 (19)	70 (21)	78 (26)	89 (32)	100 (38)	102 (39)	107 (42)	106 (41)	102 (39)	91 (33)	76 (24)	69 (21)	107 (42)
Mean maximum °F (°C)	57.1 (13.9)	57.8 (14.3)	66.7 (19.3)	75.4 (24.1)	82.7 (28.2)	89.5 (31.9)	97.1 (36.2)	97.1 (36.2)	90.8 (32.7)	79.4 (26.3)	64.9 (18.3)	55.4 (13.0)	98.8 (37.1)
Mean daily maximum °F (°C)	35.3 (1.8)	37.1 (2.8)	46.1 (7.8)	54.9 (12.7)	64.6 (18.1)	72.8 (22.7)	84.3 (29.1)	83.2 (28.4)	71.7 (22.1)	57.0 (13.9)	43.7 (6.5)	35.6 (2.0)	57.2 (14.0)
Daily mean °F (°C)	25.2 (−3.8)	26.2 (−3.2)	34.1 (1.2)	42.4 (5.8)	51.5 (10.8)	59.4 (15.2)	67.9 (19.9)	66.7 (19.3)	57.2 (14.0)	44.8 (7.1)	33.6 (0.9)	26.0 (−3.3)	44.6 (7.0)
Mean daily minimum °F (°C)	15.0 (−9.4)	15.4 (−9.2)	22.1 (−5.5)	29.9 (−1.2)	38.4 (3.6)	45.9 (7.7)	51.4 (10.8)	50.3 (10.2)	42.8 (6.0)	32.6 (0.3)	23.6 (−4.7)	16.3 (−8.7)	32.0 (0.0)
Mean minimum °F (°C)	−15.2 (−26.2)	−9.0 (−22.8)	−1.9 (−18.8)	13.9 (−10.1)	25.8 (−3.4)	35.9 (2.2)	41.9 (5.5)	40.1 (4.5)	29.3 (−1.5)	13.5 (−10.3)	−2.7 (−19.3)	−10.8 (−23.8)	−24.6 (−31.4)
Record low °F (°C)	−44 (−42)	−49 (−45)	−32 (−36)	−10 (−23)	12 (−11)	31 (−1)	35 (2)	30 (−1)	10 (−12)	−11 (−24)	−25 (−32)	−43 (−42)	−49 (−45)
Average precipitation inches (mm)	0.55 (14)	0.59 (15)	0.68 (17)	1.73 (44)	2.43 (62)	2.72 (69)	1.23 (31)	1.22 (31)	1.33 (34)	1.07 (27)	0.68 (17)	0.53 (13)	14.76 (374)
Average snowfall inches (cm)	9.2 (23)	10.1 (26)	10.1 (26)	9.4 (24)	1.9 (4.8)	0.3 (0.76)	0.0 (0.0)	0.3 (0.76)	0.8 (2.0)	5.2 (13)	9.2 (23)	9.6 (24)	66.1 (167.32)
Average extreme snow depth inches (cm)	5 (13)	4 (10)	5 (13)	4 (10)	1 (2.5)	0 (0)	0 (0)	0 (0)	0 (0)	2 (5.1)	5 (13)	5 (13)	5 (13)
Average precipitation days (≥ 0.01 in)	6.9	8.2	8.1	10.0	11.3	11.8	7.1	6.8	7.1	7.4	6.5	6.5	97.7
Average snowy days (≥ 0.1 in)	7.4	8.1	6.8	4.6	1.4	0.2	0.0	0.1	0.2	3.3	6.1	7.1	45.3
Mean monthly sunshine hours	125.1	151.7	237.5	245.7	286.6	316.5	377.4	330.8	254.4	200.4	124.8	105.4	2,756.3
Source 1: NOAA (sun 1961–1990)
Source 2: NOAA

=== Suburbs ===
Census-designated places contiguous to the City of Great Falls include:

- Black Eagle
- Malmstrom AFB

=== Nearby communities ===
The entirety of Cascade County forms the Great Falls Metropolitan statistical area. Great Falls is an economic hub for a substantially larger region that includes most of north-central Montana. Small towns and census-designated places in Cascade County near Great Falls include:

- Belt
- Cascade
- Fort Shaw
- Gibson Flats
- Monarch
- Neihart
- Sand Coulee
- Simms
- Sun Prairie
- Sun River
- Ulm
- Vaughn

== Demographics ==
Historical population
Census	Pop.	Note	%±
1890	3,979		—
1900	14,930		275.2%
1910	13,948		−6.6%
1920	24,121		72.9%
1930	28,822		19.5%
1940	29,928		3.8%
1950	39,214		31.0%
1960	55,244		40.9%
1970	60,091		8.8%
1980	56,725		−5.6%
1990	55,097		−2.9%
2000	56,690		2.9%
2010	58,505		3.2%
2020	60,442		3.3%
source: U.S. Decennial Census

=== 2020 census ===
As of the 2020 census, Great Falls had a population of 60,442. The median age was 39.3 years. 21.4% of residents were under the age of 18 and 19.6% of residents were 65 years of age or older. For every 100 females there were 98.1 males, and for every 100 females age 18 and over there were 96.0 males age 18 and over.

99.9% of residents lived in urban areas, while 0.1% lived in rural areas.

There were 26,069 households in Great Falls, of which 25.7% had children under the age of 18 living in them. Of all households, 40.6% were married-couple households, 22.2% were households with a male householder and no spouse or partner present, and 29.8% were households with a female householder and no spouse or partner present. About 35.6% of all households were made up of individuals and 15.3% had someone living alone who was 65 years of age or older.

There were 28,202 housing units, of which 7.6% were vacant. The homeowner vacancy rate was 2.0% and the rental vacancy rate was 8.2%.

Racial composition as of the 2020 census
Race	Number	Percent
White	49,656	82.2%
Black or African American	727	1.2%
American Indian and Alaska Native	3,455	5.7%
Asian	706	1.2%
Native Hawaiian and Other Pacific Islander	90	0.1%
Some other race	785	1.3%
Two or more races	5,023	8.3%
Hispanic or Latino (of any race)	2,693	4.5%

=== 2010 census ===
As of the census of 2010, there were 58,505 people, 25,301 households, and 15,135 families residing in the city. The population density was 2,684.9 inhabitants per square mile (1,036.6/km^{2}). There were 26,854 housing units at an average density of 1,232.4 per square mile (475.8/km^{2}). The racial makeup of the city was 88.5% Caucasian, 1.1% African American, 5.0% Native American, 0.9% Asian, 0.1% Pacific Islander, 0.6% from other races, and 3.8% from two or more races. Hispanic or Latino people of any race were 3.4% of the population.

There were 25,301 households, of which 28.6% had children under the age of 18 living with them, 43.6% were married couples living together, 11.5% had a female householder with no husband present, 4.8% had a male householder with no wife present, and 40.2% were non-families. 33.5% of all households were made up of individuals, and 12.7% had someone living alone who was 65 years of age or older. The average household size was 2.26 and the average family size was 2.88.

The median age in the city was 39 years. 22.5% of residents were under the age of 18; 9.9% were between the ages of 18 and 24; 24.5% were from 25 to 44; 26.5% were from 45 to 64; and 16.6% were 65 years of age or older. The gender makeup of the city was 48.9% male and 51.1% female.

=== 2000 census ===
As of the 2000 census, there were 56,690 people, 23,834 households, and 14,848 families residing in the city. The population density was 2,909.1 inhabitants per square mile (1,123.2/km^{2}). There were 25,250 housing units at an average density of 1,295.7 per square mile (500.3/km^{2}). The racial makeup of the city was 89.96% caucasian, 0.95% African American, 5.09% Native American, 0.86% Asian, 0.09% Pacific Islander, 0.60% from other races, and 2.45% from two or more races. Hispanic or Latino people of any race were 2.39% of the population.

There were 23,834 households, out of which 30.1% had children under the age of 18 living with them, 47.4% were married couples living together, 11.1% had a female householder with no husband present, and 37.7% were non-families. 31.9% of all households were made up of individuals, and 12.4% had someone living alone who was 65 years of age or older. The average household size was 2.31 and the average family size was 2.92.

In the city, the age distribution of the population shows 24.9% under the age of 18, 9.0% from 18 to 24, 27.7% from 25 to 44, 22.7% from 45 to 64, and 15.7% who were 65 years of age or older. The median age was 38 years. For every 100 females, there were 94.2 males. For every 100 females age 18 and over, there were 91.4 males.

The median income for a household in the city was $32,436, and the median income for a family was $40,107. Males had a median income of $29,353 versus $20,859 for females. The per capita income for the city was $18,059. About 11.1% of families and 14.5% of the population were below the poverty line, including 20.3% of those under the age of 18 and 9.2% of those 65 and older.

== Economy ==
=== Historic economy ===
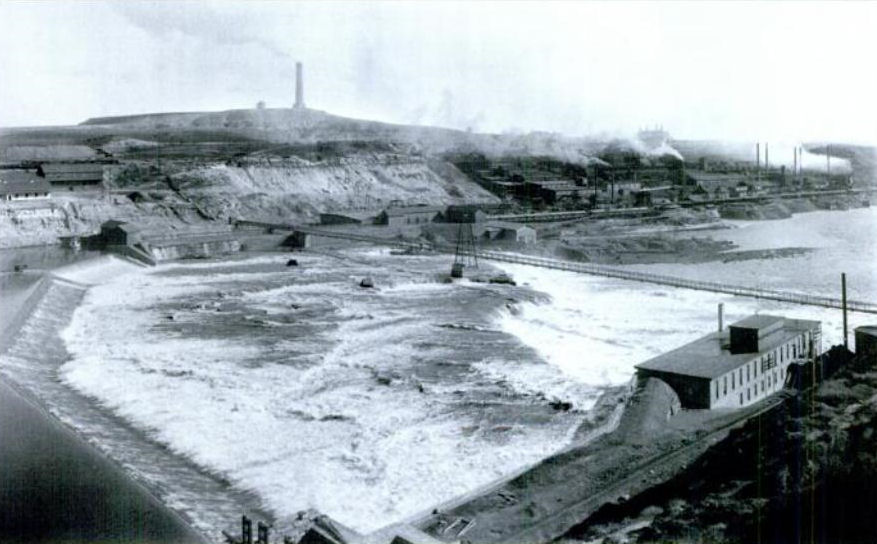
The smelter and dam at Great Falls c. 1910

Built as a railroad hub, Great Falls initially relied heavily on ore smelting in its early years. Black Eagle Dam, opened in 1890, was the first hydroelectric dam built in Montana and the first built on the Missouri River. The energy industry helped give the city of Great Falls the nickname "The Electric City". The same year, the Boston and Montana Consolidated Copper and Silver Mining Company broke ground on a large smelter in the city, drawn to the location by the power provided by the dam. Elements came online over the next few years, with the final works—an electrolytic refinery and blast furnaces—completed in February and April 1893. By 1892, more than 1,000 workers were employed at the smelter. Energy production received a boost with the discovery of petroleum about 100 miles (160 km) north of the city in the late 1910s. Great Falls boasted two oil refineries by 1920, although a devastating fire left the city with just one after 1929.

Great Falls suffered its first major economic crisis in 1893. Banks and industry in the city were severely undercapitalized, and the Panic of 1893 cut off access to money in the east. The price of silver collapsed and nearby mines closed. Markets for beef, mutton, and wool largely disappeared, leaving area ranchers destitute. A large number of businesses in Great Falls shut their doors. The city was largely saved by the smelter, which continued to employ about 900 workers from 1895 to 1900. A North Montana Agricultural Society was formed to bring improvements in the practice of cattle ranching and wheat farming, and to lobby for federal- and state-funded irrigation projects. An attempt to win state legislative approval for an official state fair to be located at Great Falls failed in 1894, but organizers were successful in holding the first Cascade County Fair in May 1895.

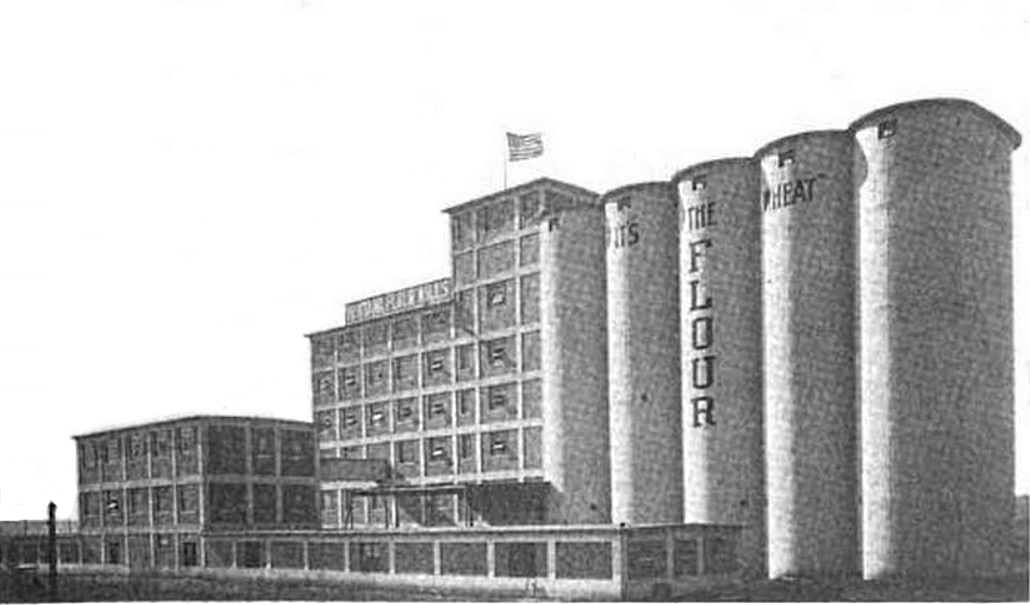
Montana Flour Mills in Great Falls in 1920

The city became even more prominent as an agricultural products center. Wheat production began to soar in Montana during the 1906-1907 growing season, and by 1920 there were 11 railroad spur lines radiating from the city to collect the grain from local farmers. The city's easy access to inexpensive electrical power made it ideal for grain milling and meat refrigeration, and enabled Great Falls to become a major center for farmers and ranchers. The Royal Milling Company was founded in Great Falls in 1892, and within seven years was making half the flour in the state. It tripled its capacity to 10,500 US bushels (370,000 L; 84,000 US dry gal; 81,000 imp gal) per day in 1917, then in 1928 merged with about 25 other mills nationwide to form General Mills. Montana Flour Mills opened its Great Falls facility in 1916, and had a capacity of 4,500 US bushels (160,000 L; 36,000 US dry gal; 35,000 imp gal) per day in 1920. Royal had a regional grain storage capacity in 1920 of more than 1,500,000 US bushels (53,000,000 L; 12,000,000 US dry gal; 12,000,000 imp gal), while Montana Flour's approached 2,250,000 US bushels (79,000,000 L; 18,000,000 US dry gal; 17,400,000 imp gal). Brewing became a major industry in the city, with the 1892 Montana Brewing Company (makers of Great Falls Select beer) leading the way. The city's close proximity to Montana's cattle-rich Judith Basin also led to the development of a large meat packing industry. Led by the Great Falls Meat Co., Needham Packing Company, Stafford Meat Co., Valley Meat Market, and other slaughterhouses, Great Falls was the largest meat packing center between Spokane, Washington, and Minneapolis, Minnesota, by the 1930s.

The city's population boomed, reaching 30,000 by 1913. The 145-bed Columbus Hospital (a Catholic Church-owned facility) opened in 1892 and the 330-bed Montana Deaconess Medical Center (originally a Methodist Episcopal Church facility) opened in 1898, making the city a destination for those with serious healthcare needs for central Montana. During the 1910s, Great Falls became known as a regional banking city, with three national- and three state-chartered banks (although just two national and one state bank would survive the Great Depression). Large regional deposits of clay, coal, gypsum, limestone, and sandstone led to the emergence of large brick works, cement works, plaster works, and stone cutting facilities in the town. (Note: The Great Northern Railway opened coal mines in Cascade County in the 1890s, making Great Falls a leader in coal production in the state.)

A major drought hit the counties north of the Missouri River in 1917, and spread to the rest of the state in 1918. Massive swarms of locusts struck the state in 1919, and in 1920 strong, steady winds eroded the topsoil, damaging the productivity of the soil and creating a "dust bowl" effect. (Note: Montana farmers engaged in deep plowing of the topsoil. The unanchored soil turned to dust in drought conditions, and the winds heavily eroded the topsoil.) Montana farmers were therefore largely unable to take advantage of the high price of wheat and other agricultural products created by wartime demand and the loss of agricultural output in Europe caused by World War I. The drought did not end: Just six of the 13 years from 1917 to 1930 saw average or above-average precipitation in the state. As agricultural production in Europe recovered after 1920, war-inflated agricultural prices collapsed. (Note: The price of a bushel of wheat nearly halved, dropping from $2.40 to $1.25.) The high costs associated with the Great Falls-area underground coal mines led to the collapse of this local industry in the 1920s as well, devastating Great Falls coal dealers and shippers. Although the post–World War I recession lifted nationally by 1922, the economy of Great Falls and the rest of the state remained mired in depression until the mid-1920s.

The city's economy stagnated during the Great Depression. The price of copper fell by nearly 75 percent to just 5 cents a pound between 1929 and 1933. Anaconda cut production in the state by 75 percent and closed its plant in Great Falls, throwing hundreds out of work. Agricultural prices, too, collapsed. Half of the state's farmers lost their land to foreclosure, and 60,000 of the 80,000 homesteaders who had arrived between 1900 and 1917 left the state. By the time the Great Depression ended in 1940, 11,000 farms (20 percent of the state's total) had been abandoned and 2,000,000 acres (810,000 ha) of farmland had gone out of cultivation. Even as the national population grew by 16 percent between 1930 and 1940, Montana's population declined. Great Falls was one of the rare places in Montana which saw population growth. The city grew from 28,822 residents in 1930 to 29,928 residents in 1940.

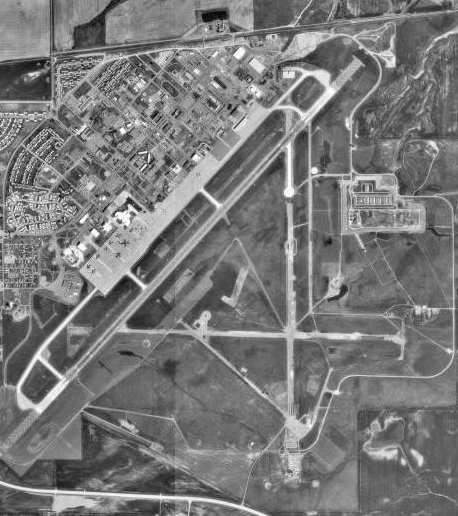
Malmstrom Air Force Base in 1995

World War II saw the establishment of East Base (now Malmstrom Air Force Base) in Great Falls in 1941, which proved to be a turning point economically. The war not only created a huge demand for the agricultural products and metal products provided by the city but also fueled significant population growth in Great Falls. The base brought 4,000 new residents to the city; by 1943, the city's population had shot up by about 5,600 to 35,000. These new residents created a huge demand for goods and services, and a large number of new businesses sprang up to supply the base with its needs. The rapid population growth created a housing construction boom in Great Falls. The federal government paid for the construction of 300 new single-family homes during the war, although this was nowhere near the amount of new housing needed. East Base created a fundamental cultural and social shift in the city, one which became more pronounced over time as active-duty personnel stayed in the city after retirement. The war also saw a major improvement to the Great Falls Municipal Airport. The 1928 facility received its first air traffic control tower in 1942, paid for by the federal government after the vast increase in flights over the city after the construction of the new air base.

By 1950, Great Falls was Montana's largest city, having added 33 percent more residents during the 1940s. Much of the city's growth was due to rising federal investment in defense and healthcare, and it was an important regional convention, trade, and medical center. In 1951, Anaconda consolidated its statewide zinc production in Great Falls, adding substantial numbers of new workers, and in 1955 opened an aluminum smelter in the city. The O.S. Warden Bridge opened in 1951. Designed to turn a then-mostly undeveloped 10th Avenue S. into a straight-line bypass through the city, (Note: The state made 10th Avenue S. a state highway in October 1933. Prior to the construction of the Warden Bridge, west-bound traffic had to take a convoluted route through the city to cross the Missouri River: Traffic entering from the east would turn north on E. 57th Street, turn west on 2nd Avenue N., turn south on Park Drive, and cross the river using the Central Avenue Bridge. Most traffic then traveled west on Central Avenue W. before turning south on 6th Street SW to cross the Sun River and connect with U.S. Route 91. This forced nearly all traffic through the city's main business district.) Extraordinary increases in traffic on 10th Avenue S. led the state to transform the two-lane street in 1956 into an 80-foot (24 m) wide four-lane highway with a central median. (Note: 10th Avenue S. was "one of the first in Montana to be designed and constructed with a center median and left-turn bays".) Previously an undeveloped area with only the occasional residence, the 1956 changes to 10th Avenue S. turned the highway into a vibrant business district. Construction of the new campus of the College of Great Falls began on 10th Avenue S. in 1959, (Note: Since 1933, the college had been located in a disused nursing school building located on the southwest corner of 3rd Avenue N. and 17th Street N. on the campus of Columbus Hospital. The college built the McLaughlin Center, a recreation center with gymnasium and swimming pool, in 1964.) and the new Deaconess Hospital in 1963. 10th Avenue S. received its first traffic signals in 1964.

Great Falls' reputation as a retail hub for central Montana emerged in the 1960s. The Holiday Village Mall opened as an open-air shopping center in 1959, and by 1969 had expanded to become a modern enclosed shopping mall. Westgate Mall opened in 1965, Agri-Village Warehouse (later Agri-Village Shopping Center) in 1967, and Evergreen Mall in 1983. The city was one of Montana's most important agricultural equipment sales and distribution hubs, and the Great Falls Livestock Commission Company (established in 1936) had become an important multistate livestock auction center.

In the 1960s, Great Falls' economic future appeared bright. The city's population reached 55,357 in 1960, an 85 percent increase since 1940. It was one of the fastest-growing cities in the nation. Including the adjacent unincorporated town of Black Eagle, Malmstrom Air Force Base personnel, and certain minor adjacent residential blocks, the population was estimated to be more than 72,000 by 1964. The largest city in Montana in 1965, state planning agencies believed Great Falls would have a population of 100,000 by 1981.

The economy of Great Falls began a significant diminution in the 1970s. The nation of Chile nationalized Anaconda Copper's extensive, lucrative copper mines in 1971, causing the company to suffer massive financial losses. It closed its Great Falls zinc operation in 1971, and the rest of the smelter in 1980. About 1,450 high-wage Anaconda employees lost their jobs during the decade. Changes in the defense posture of the United States led to significant cutbacks at Malmstrom Air Force Base as well. These included the loss of 476 airmen and officers in 1972, (Note: The 29th Fighter-interceptor Squadron was activated and assigned to Malmstrom in November 1953. The unit was inactivated in July 1968, with a loss of 300 jobs. The newly-inactivated 71st Fighter-Interceptor Squadron was reactivated and assigned to Malmstrom in its place in July 1968. Redesignated the 319th Fighter-Interceptor Squadron in July 1971, the unit was inactivated in April 1972 with the loss of 476 airmen and officer jobs.) 30 airmen in 1974, 1,015 airmen and officers in 1979, 100 airmen in 1981, 30 airmen in 1982, and 360 airmen and officers in 1983. The job losses stripped $18.2 million from the local economy in 1985 alone. The base lost another 1,017 jobs between 1992 and 1996.

=== Current economy ===
Since the Great Recession of 2008–2010, the Great Falls economy proved sluggish, growing at an annual rate of 0.9 percent, compared to a statewide average of 1.8 percent and a national rate of 2.0 percent. Growth was strongest in construction and manufacturing, followed by back-office business services (such as Blue Cross Blue Shield of Montana's new insurance claims processing center), healthcare (such as the opening of the Great Falls Clinic Hospital), retail sales, social welfare (such as the opening of the Cameron Family Center, which houses 26 homeless families), and tourism. The city's lack of population growth, coupled with low commodity prices for agricultural producers, has significantly hindered growth in the city for two decades.

The lack of growth worsened poverty in the city. There were no neighborhoods of concentrated poverty (Note: Concentrated poverty is defined as a neighborhood where more than 40 percent of the residents have an income below the federal poverty line.) in the city in 2010, but by 2016 1,254 city residents lived in such areas. The number of Great Falls residents living in poverty during the same period rose by 10.37 percent (1,100 people), for a citywide poverty rate of 19.9 percent. Great Falls suffered from more concentrated poverty than any other city in the state.

Low economic and population growth have also harmed real estate values in the city. While the median price of a home in five other large Montana cities (Billings, Bozeman, Helena, Kalispell, and Missoula) was $262,960 ($400,000 in 2025 dollars) in 2017, it was just $169,500 ($200,000 in 2025 dollars) in Great Falls during the same period. (That is $93,460, or 35.5 percent, less.) The median price of a home statewide in Montana during that period was $217,200 ($300,000 in 2025 dollars), with Great Falls home prices $47,700, or 22 percent, less.

A 2016 report by the Bureau of Business and Economic Development at the University of Montana predicted the city's economy would be driven by manufacturing, retail sales, and tourism over the next several years. The city had long tried to rebuild its agricultural processing industry, and egg production and specialty milling both saw expanded operations in the city in 2015. In 2016, the city won an $8 million grant from the state of Montana to open a Food and Ag Development Center (only one of four in Montana). Working with BNSF Railway, the city's development agency converted 197 acres (80 ha) of disused railroad yard into a full service heavy industrial food and agricultural processing site. Named AgriTech Park, the site won an Excellence in Regional Transportation Award from the National Association of Development Organizations. FedEx Ground, Helena Chemical, Montana Specialty Mills, Pacific Steel and Recycling, and Cargill all took space in the park by the end of 2018.

In June of 2026 Montana Gov. Gianforte announced that Janicki Industries would be building an $800M aerospace and defense manufacturing facility in Great Falls beginning that same summer.

=== Military ===
Great Falls is home to Malmstrom Air Force Base and the 341st Missile Wing. The 341st Operations Group provides the forces to launch, monitor and secure the wing's Intercontinental ballistic missile (ICBM) and missile alert facilities (MAF). These ICBMs and MAFs are dispersed over the largest missile complex in the Western Hemisphere, an area encompassing some 23,000 sq mi (60,000 km^{2}) (approximately the size of the state of West Virginia). The group manages a variety of equipment, facilities, and vehicles worth more than $5 billion.

Also at Malmstrom are the 819th RED HORSE Squadron (reactivated August 8, 1997) and the 219th RED HORSE Squadron Montana Air National Guard. Both units are rapid deployment units, and are the first "associate" RED HORSE squadrons in the Air Force, staffed by approximately two-thirds active-duty military and one-third Air National Guard personnel.

Great Falls International Airport is home to multiple military units, including the Montana Air National Guard's 120th Airlift Wing, which is composed of C-130H cargo aircraft and associated support personnel. Two U.S. Army Reserve units, the 364th Sustainment Command (Expeditionary) and the 889th Quartermaster Company also call the airport home.

== Arts and culture ==
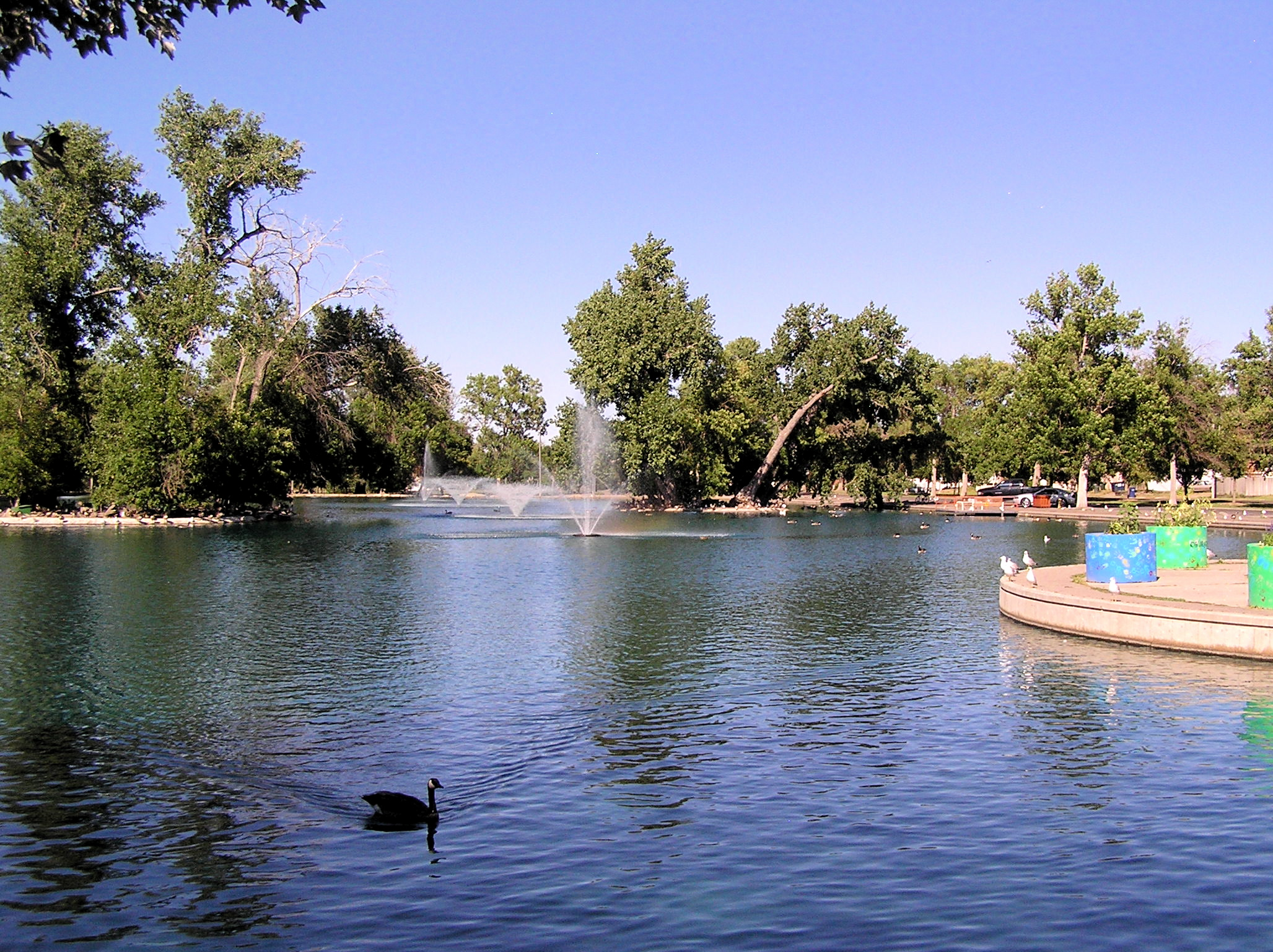
Gibson Park

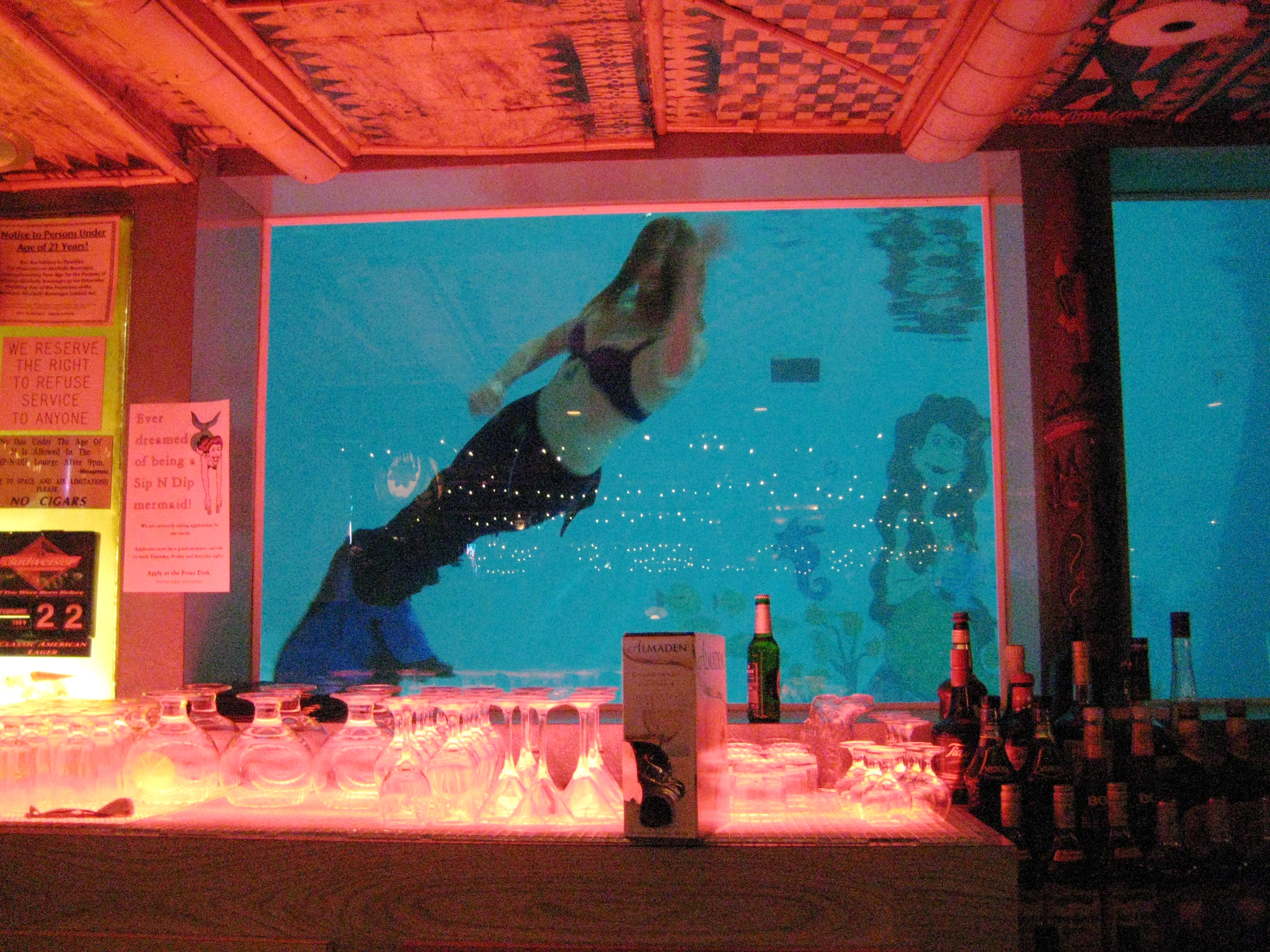
A mermaid swimming in the pool of the Sip 'n' Dip lounge in Great Falls

Great Falls has a symphony orchestra, founded in 1959, which performs concert series, sponsors the youth orchestras the Cascade String Quartet and Chinook Winds Quintet, offers chamber ensembles, and offers an educational outreach program.

There are ten museums in Great Falls. The Lewis and Clark Interpretive Center has the "most extensive collection of the entire corps of discovery expedition". It is a 25,000 square-foot building that includes an exhibit hall, theater, and an outdoor amphitheater by the Missouri River. The C.M. Russell Museum Complex covers an entire city block and features the original Russell house and studio. The Montana Museum of Railroad History includes a caboose to tour and two of the largest model train layouts in the northwest.

The community also is notable for the unique Sip 'n Dip Lounge, a tiki bar located downtown in the O'Haire Motor Inn. Built in 1962, it features an indoor swimming pool visible through a window in the bar where women dressed as mermaids swim underwater. In 2003, GQ magazine rated the lounge as one of the top 10 bars in the world, and the #1 bar in the world "worth flying for". With the added feature of an octogenarian piano player named "Piano Pat", noted for her "unusual covers" of songs by Frank Sinatra and other performers of the 1960s, Frommer's travel guide calls it "one of the kitschiest, wackiest, and flat-out coolest nightspots, not just in Montana, but in the entire West".

The city has 57 neighborhood parks, a water park, and the River's Edge Trail that covers almost 60 miles along both sides of the Missouri River. The Great Falls Public Library has served the city for over 140 years. The city also partners with the Little Free Library program.

=== Four Seasons Arena ===
The Four Seasons Arena is a multi-purpose indoor sports and exhibition arena located in the city of Great Falls, Montana, in the United States. Constructed in 1979, it served primarily as an ice rink until 2005. The failure of the practice rink's refrigeration system in 2003 and the management's decision to close the main rink in 2006 led to the facility's reconfiguration as an indoor sports and exhibition space. As of May 2011 it was the largest exhibition, music, and sports venue in the city.

== Sports ==
Club	Sport	League	Stadium (or arena)
Great Falls Voyagers	Baseball	Pioneer League	Centene Stadium
Great Falls Americans	Ice Hockey	North American 3 Hockey League	Great Falls Ice Plex
Great Falls Electric	Basketball	The Basketball League	Great Falls High School

For the 1979–80 WHL season, Great Falls and the Four Seasons Arena was the home of the Great Falls Americans hockey team (see below). The team was 2–25 before folding. Great Falls has a rich baseball history with the Voyagers. Formerly called the White Sox, Dodgers and Giants, baseball players such as Pedro Martínez, José Offerman, and Raúl Mondesí have spent time in Great Falls with the team. Since 1988, the team has won the Pioneer League championship six times (1988, 1989, 1990, 2002, 2008, and 2011). In 2007, the Great Falls Explorers basketball team were the CBA National Conference Runner-up.

Great Falls has been home to the Great Falls Americans Junior A ice hockey team since the 2011–2012 season.

Great Falls was home to the Great Falls Gladiators semi-professional football team which played in the Rocky Mountain Football League.

== Government ==
The city has a commission-manager form of government. The commission is composed of the mayor and four elected commissioners. The mayor serves a two-year term. Cory Reeves became mayor in 2024. He was re-elected in November 2025. The commissioners are elected to overlapping four-year terms.

== Education ==
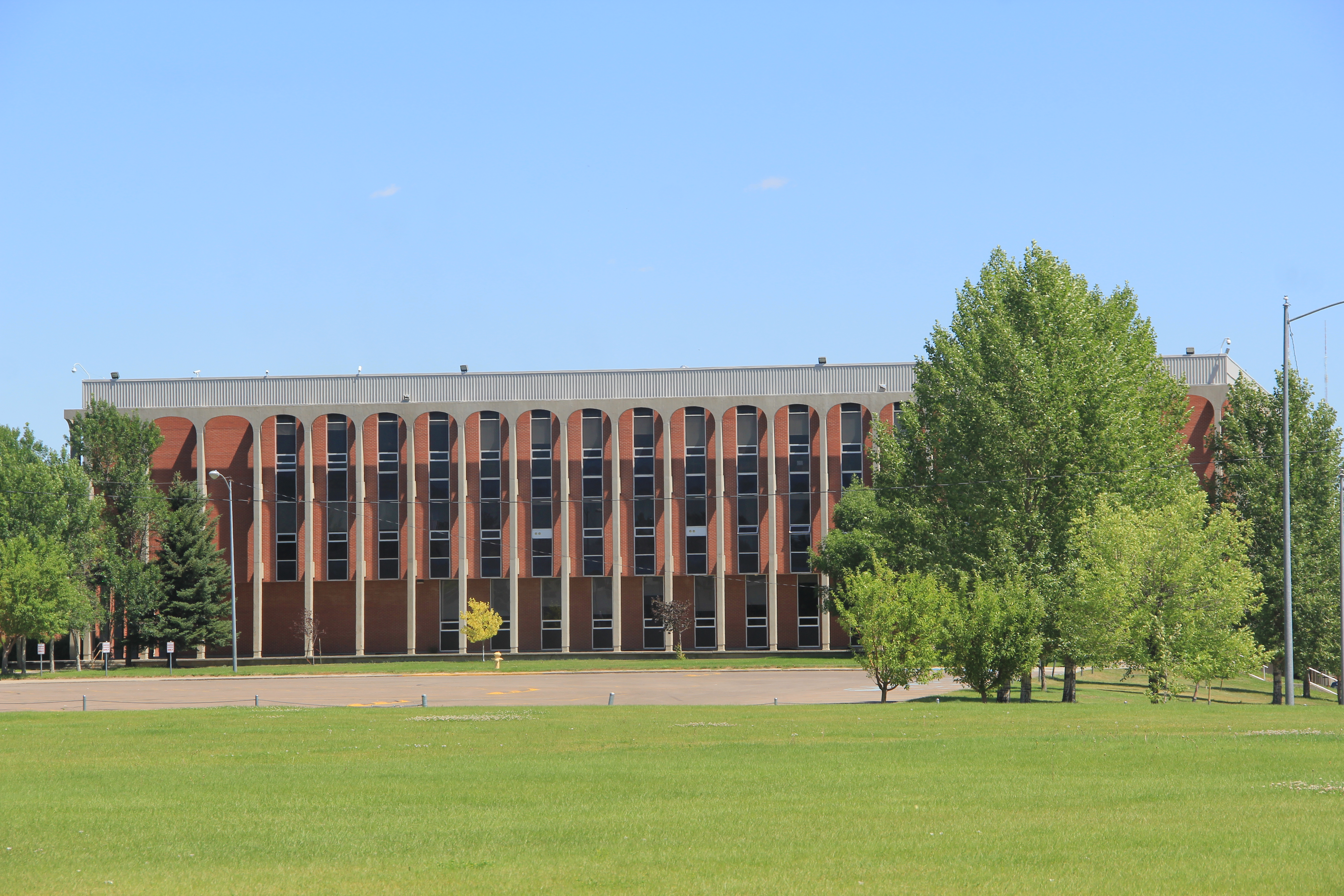
Charles M. Russell High School

The Great Falls Public Schools system, including both elementary and high school districts, covers the entire city.

The elementary school district and high school district have the same territory, and include: Great Falls, Black Eagle, Gibson Flats, Malmstrom Air Force Base, and portions of Sun Prairie and Ulm.

There are 20 schools within the system. These include two public high schools, an alternative high school, two middle schools, and 15 elementary schools. The two public high schools are Great Falls High School and Charles M. Russell High School. The alternative high school is Paris Gibson Education Center, located in the former Paris Gibson Junior High School building. The two middle schools are North Middle School and East Middle School.

The state-operated Montana School for the Deaf & Blind is in Great Falls.

Great Falls also is home to many private schools, all of them sponsored by religious organizations. The Catholic Church sponsors Great Falls Montessori (grades Pre-K to K), St. Patrick's Academy West (Pre-K to grade 8), St. Patrick's Academy East (Pre-K to grade 8), and St. Patrick's Academy High School (grades 9 to 12). These schools were merged in 2025 and were previously named Our Lady of Lourdes Catholic School, Holy Spirit Catholic School, and Great Falls Central Catholic High School. Additionally the team name for all three schools was changed from Mustangs to Wolfhounds.

The Conservative Baptist Association of America sponsors two schools in the city: Heritage Baptist School (K to grade 9) and Treasure State Baptist Academy (Pre-K to grade 12). The Seventh-day Adventist Church also sponsors two schools: Adventist Christian (grades 1 to 8) and Five Falls Christian Church (grades 1 to 8). There is also a nondenominational Christian school, Foothills Community Christian School (Pre-K to grade 12).

Great Falls is home to three institutions of higher education. Great Falls College Montana State University is a two-year public institution of higher learning. It was founded as the Great Falls Vocational-Technical Center in 1969, and received its current name after the state restructured the two-year comprehensive colleges in 2012. It became part of the Montana University System in 1994. The University of Providence, a private, four-year Catholic university, was founded in 1932 by the Sisters of Providence and the Ursuline Sisters. It was named the University of Great Falls until 2017. On October 27, 2026, the University of Providence announced it will close on August 20, 2027.

Touro College of Osteopathic Medicine (TouroCOM) opened in August 2023. It is part of the New York-based Touro University System and is the first Medical School in Montana.

Apollos University was a private, distance education university, founded in 2005 and headquartered in Great Falls since 2016. It closed in 2024.

== Media ==
=== AM radio ===
- KMON 560
- KEIN 1310
- KXGF 1400
- KQDI 1450

=== FM radio ===
- KGPR 89.9
- KLFM 92.9
- KMON-FM 94.5
- KVVR 97.9
- KAAK 98.9
- KLSK 100.3
- KMXM 101.9
- KINX 102.7
- KIKF 104.9
- KQDI-FM 106.1
- KIMO 107.3

=== Television ===
- KRTV 3 (CBS)
- KFBB 5 (ABC)
- KTGF-LD 50 (NBC) – (rebroadcasts KTVH-DT Helena)
- KUGF-TV 21 (PBS)

=== Newspapers ===
The Great Falls Tribune is published in Great Falls. Great Falls is the second largest media market in the state of Montana. As of 2022, The paper is no longer printed locally. Instead it is printed in Helena Montana and distributed daily via US Postal Service.

The Great Falls Gazette is published in Great Falls. The paper is printed and published locally and offers over 90% local content. The Gazette is locally owned and supports the local economy. It is distributed by a private delivery network, postal service, and single rack sales.

== Infrastructure ==
=== Transportation ===
==== Airports ====
Great Falls is served by Great Falls International Airport, with four passenger and five cargo airlines. Of those, only Allegiant Air and Fed Ex Express provide service to the city with mainline (large) jet aircraft.

==== Highways ====
Great Falls is served by the following highways:

- Interstate 15
- Interstate 15 Business/Interstate 315 (not official signed as I-315)
- U.S. Route 87
- U.S. Route 89
- Montana Highway 3
- Montana Highway 200
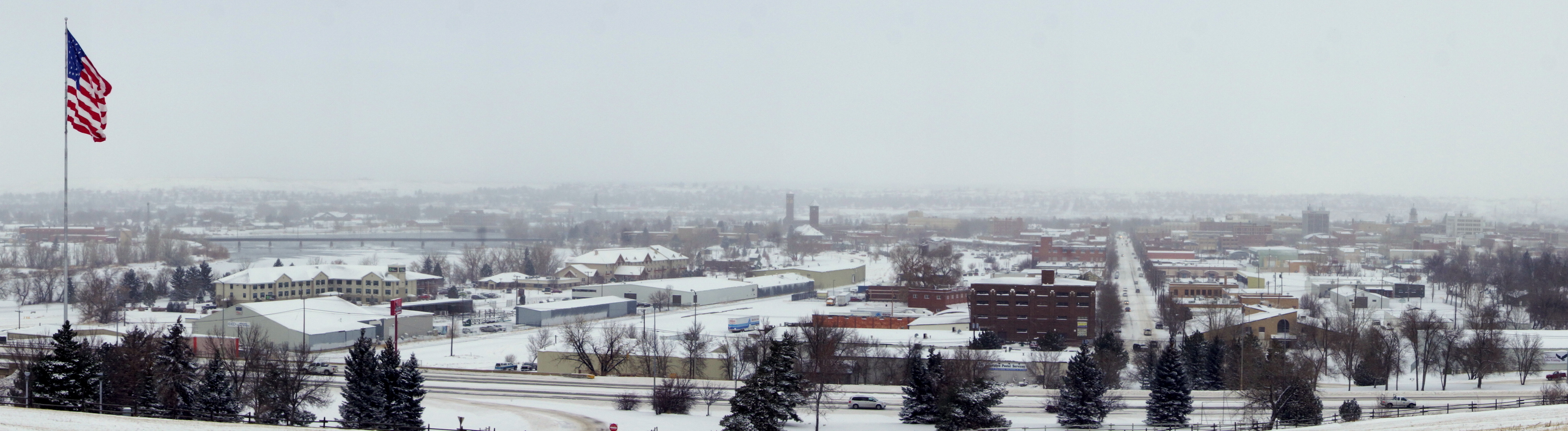
Great Falls in the winter. The Missouri River and Flag Hill are pictured leftmost, with the downtown area to the right.

== Notable people ==
- Valeen Tippetts Avery, biographer and historian
- Bosco, contestant on RuPaul's Drag Race (season 14)
- Walter Breuning (1896–2011), once the oldest man in the world
- Mal Bross, National Football League player
- James R. Browning, judge and former Chief Judge on U.S. Court of Appeals for the Ninth Circuit and former clerk of U.S. Supreme Court
- Big Wind Carpenter, environmental and indigenous activist
- Dorothy Coburn, silent-movie actress
- Walter Coy, actor
- Brian Coyle, Minnesota community leader and gay activist
- Garrison Courtney, former federal employee and con-artist
- Scott Davis, figure skater
- Dave Dickenson, Canadian Football League quarterback
- Patrick Dwyer, National Hockey League player
- Cory Fong, North Dakota State Tax Commissioner
- Todd Foster, Olympic boxer
- Norman A. Fox, Western author
- Kathleen Galvin-Halcro, former Montana state representative
- Ted Geoghegan, horror filmmaker
- John Gibbons, Major League Baseball manager
- Paris Gibson, U.S. Senator, city founder
- Missy Gold, child actress on Benson
- Tyler Graham, professional baseball player
- Melony G. Griffith, member of Maryland House of Delegates
- A.B. Guthrie Jr., author of The Way West
- Malcolm Hancock, magazine cartoonist
- Charles S. Hartman, U.S. Representative from Montana
- Paul G. Hatfield, Federal District Court Judge (1979–2000), U.S. Senator, Chief Justice of the Montana Supreme Court, Montana state District Court Judge
- Lester Hogan, pioneer in microwave and semiconductor technology
- George Horse-Capture, Native American activist and museum curator
- Joseph Kinsey Howard, author and historian
- Josh Huestis, NBA player
- Patrick M. Hughes, Lieutenant General, United States Army, Director of the Defense Intelligence Agency, 1996–1999
- Alma Smith Jacobs, director, Great Falls Public Library; first African American Montana State Librarian
- Jay L. Johnson, U.S. Navy admiral, Chief of Naval Operations
- Raymond A. Johnson, aviation pioneer, worked at Great Falls airport in 1940s
- Nathaniel Bar Jonah, convicted kidnapper, child molester, suspected serial killer and cannibal
- Edward McKnight Kauffer, early 20th-century graphic designer and poster artist
- Pert Kelton, actress, the original Alice Kramden on The Honeymooners
- Ryan Lance, CEO of ConocoPhillips
- Ryan Leaf, former NFL quarterback
- Barbara Luddy, actress
- Howard Lyman, vegetarian activist
- Mike Mansfield, U.S. Representative, Senator, longest-serving Senate majority leader, U.S. Ambassador to Japan
- Linda McDonald, drummer in all-girl metal band Phantom Blue
- Cyra McFadden, writer
- Hugh Mitchell, served in United States Senate 1945–1946 and House of Representatives 1949–1953 for the state of Washington
- Gerald R. Molen, film producer
- George Montgomery, actor, painter, sculptor and stuntman, born in nearby Brady
- Matt Morrison, Fox Sports Net sportscaster
- Dallas Neil former NFL punter
- Andrew Nelson, Japanese-language lexicographer
- Tom Neville, NFL player
- Tera Patrick, adult film actress
- John Misha Petkevich, figure skater
- Charles Nelson Pray, former U.S. Representative from Montana
- Charley Pride, country singer
- Traver Rains, half of the New York fashion design duo Heatherette
- Merle Greene Robertson, artist, art historian, archaeologist, and Mayan researcher
- Hannah Rose, Christian musician
- Adam Rosendale, Montana state legislator and businessman
- William V. Roth, Jr., U.S. Representative and Senator from Delaware
- Charles Marion Russell, western artist
- Brian Salonen, tight end for the Dallas Cowboys
- Jaymee Sire, ESPN sportscaster
- Jon Steele, American expat author
- Wallace Stegner, author of Angle of Repose
- Haila Stoddard, actress, writer, producer and director
- Anton D. Strouf, Montana and Wisconsin state legislator, lawyer
- Gary W. Thomas, California state judge
- Edward L. Thrasher, Los Angeles, City Council member 1931–1942, born in Great Falls
- Al Ullman, U.S. Congressman from Oregon
- Thomas C. Wasson (1896–1948), diplomat who was killed while serving as the Consul General for the United States in Jerusalem
- Reggie Watts, comedian, musician, performance artist
- John Warner, justice of the Montana Supreme Court
- Irving Weissman, scientist
- Bill Zadick, wrestler
- Mike Zadick, wrestler

== In popular culture ==
Several motion pictures have been filmed in Great Falls. These include:

- Thunderbolt and Lightfoot (1974) (Note: Shot in Cascade County and in the city of Great Falls, the film's climactic moment features George Kennedy's character driving a car through the main window of The Paris department store, at the corner of 4th Street and Central Avenue. Another scene shows Jeff Bridges' character walking on 4th Street on the same corner. Tracy's restaurant and the Great Falls Civic Center can be seen in the same scene.)
- Telefon (1977) (Note: Filming sites included the Great Falls International Airport and the historic F-89 (Aircraft 53-2547) mounted there. A 1913 brick annex to the Paris Gibson Square Museum of Art was blown up for one of the film's opening scenes.)
- The Stone Boy (1983)
- Unsolved Mysteries (Season 3, Episode 12; 1990)
- Holy Matrimony (1994) (Note: Filmed both in Cascade County and in the city of Great Falls, the city scenes include shots of Joseph Gordon-Levitt's character outside Tracy's restaurant, and Patricia Arquette's character inside the restaurant. The Montana State Fair at the Montana ExpoPark stood in for the Iowa State Fair in the film.)
- The Slaughter Rule (2002) (Note: Filming occurred inside the Saatz Block building on the corner of 4th Street South and 2nd Avenue South. This served as the apartment in which Ryan Gosling and David Morse discuss football.)
- Northfork (2003) (Note: Although primarily filmed outside Cascade County, the film had an office in Great Falls, and cast and crew stayed in the city. One scene was filmed at Giant Springs State Park on the immediate outskirts of the city.)
- Iron Ridge (2008)
- The Vessel (2009)
- Reborn (2008)
- Tomorrow Will Be... (2010)
- Who's in the Mirror (2013)
- The Best Bar in America (2013) (Note: Scenes were filmed at the Sip 'n Dip Lounge in Great Falls.)

== Sister city ==
Great Falls has two sister cities, as designated by Sister Cities International (SCI): Lethbridge, Alberta, Canada, and Sharya, Kostroma Oblast, Russia.

== See also ==
- Great Falls Flag Hill
- Ice Breaker Road Race
- 2013 Emergency Alert System hijackings

== Bibliography ==
- Bureau of Business and Economic Development (2018). 2018 Montana Economic Report (PDF) (Report). Missoula, Mont.: University of Montana. Archived (PDF) from the original on March 5, 2018.
- Cornett, Lloyd H.; Johnson, Mildred W. (1980). A Handbook of Aerospace Defense Organization, 1946–1980 (PDF). Peterson AFB, Colo.: Office of History, Aerospace Defense Center. Archived (PDF) from the original on March 22, 2006.
- Curry, John A. (December 15, 1920). "The Story of Great Falls". Northwestern Miller.
- Farley, John T. (1965). Economic Impact of the Growth of Tenth Avenue South Upon the Economy of Great Falls, Montana: 1940-1965 (Report). Great Falls, Mont.: College of Great Falls.
- Federal Writers' Project (1939). Montana: A State Guide Book. New York: Viking Press. OCLC 19490170.
- Furdell, William J. (2002). "The Great Falls Home Front During World War II". In Fritz, Harry W.; Murphy, Mary; Swartout, Robert R. (eds.). Montana Legacy: Essays on History, People, and Place. Helena, Mont.: Montana Historical Society Press. ISBN 9780917298905.
- Hofman, H.O. (1904). "Notes on the Metallurgy of Copper of Montana". Transactions of the American Institute of Mining Engineers. New York: American Institute of Mining Engineers.
- Holmes, Oliver M. (October 1913). "Progress of Great Falls, Montana". Coast Banker.
- Holmes, Krys; Dailey, Susan C.; Walter, David (2008). Montana: Stories of the Land. Helena, Mont.: Montana Historical Society Press. ISBN 9780975919637.
- Howard, Joseph Kinsey (2003). Montana: High, Wide, and Handsome. Lincoln, Neb.: University of Nebraska Press. ISBN 9780803273399.
- Holmes, Krys; dailey, Susan C.; Walter, David (2008). Montana: Stories of the Land. Helena, Mont.: Montana Historical Society Press. ISBN 9780975919637.
- Malone, Michael P.; Roeder, Richard B.; Lang, William L. (1991). Montana: A History of Two Centuries. Seattle: University of Washington Press. ISBN 9780295971209.
- Marcosson, Isaac F. (1957). Anaconda. New York: Anaconda Company. OCLC 185693759.
- Mercier, Laurie (2001). Anaconda: Labor, Community, and Culture in Montana's Smelter City. Urbana, Ill.: University of Illinois Press. ISBN 9780252026577.
- Mutschler, Charles V. (2002). Wired for Success: The Butte, Anaconda and Pacific Railway, 1892–1985. Pullman, Wash.: Washington State University Press. ISBN 9780874222524.
- Peterson, Don (2010). Great Falls. Charleston, S.C.: Arcadia Publishing. ISBN 9780738580845.
- Spence, Clark C. (1978). Montana: A Bicentennial History. New York: Norton. ISBN 9780393056792.
- Taliaferro, John (2003). Charles M. Russell: The Life and Legend of America's Cowboy Artist. Norman, Okla.: University of Oklahoma Press. ISBN 9780806134956.
- Wyckoff, William (2006). On the Road Again: Montana's Changing Landscape. Seattle: University of Washington Press. ISBN 9780295986128.
