= Flag Hill (Great Falls, Montana) =

Public park in Montana, United States

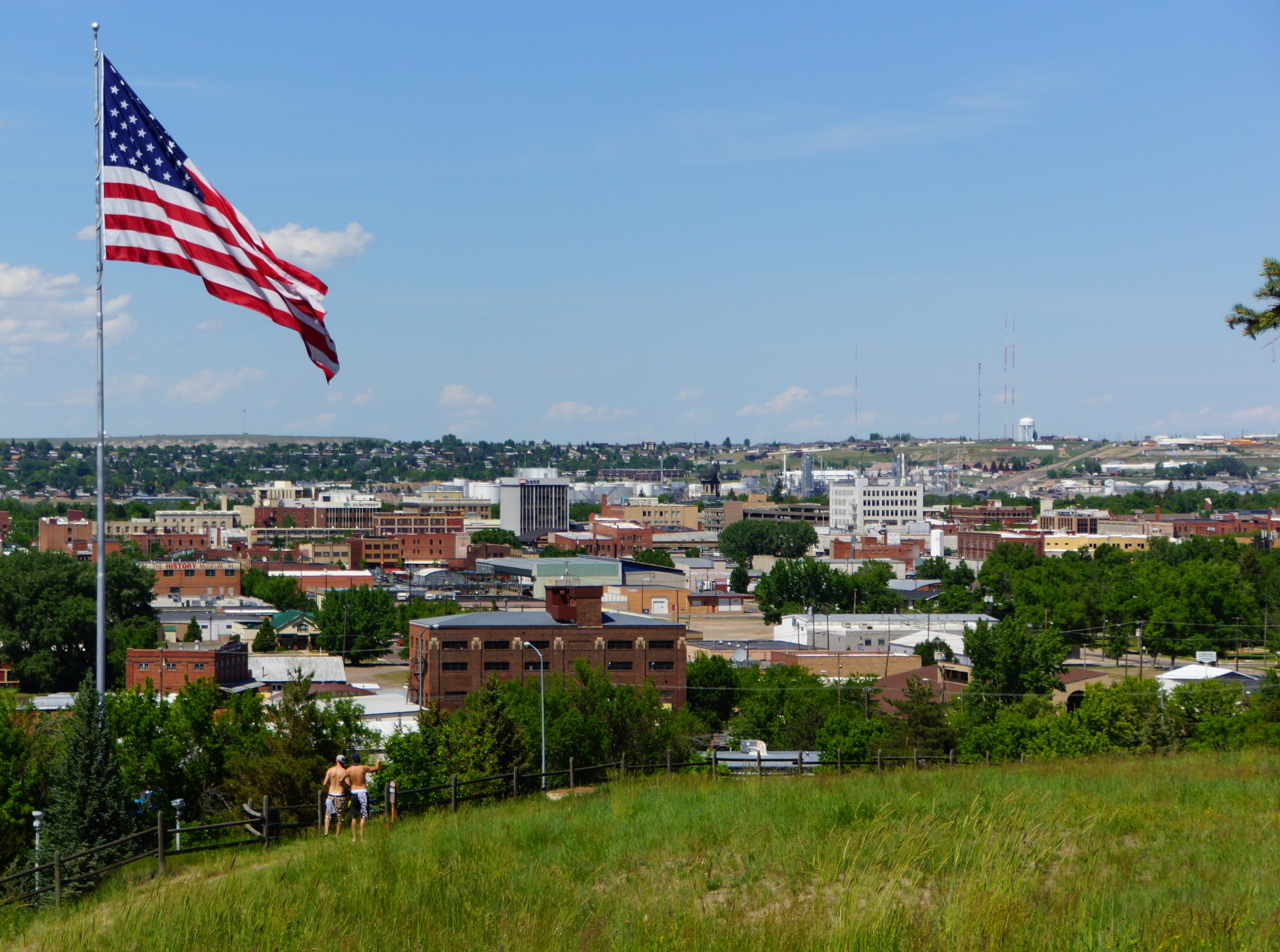
- Flag over the Falls
- Interactive map of Flag Hill
- 47.493061°N 111.305678°W
- Location: Great Falls

History
- Built: June 7, 1984

The Flag Hill, also known as the Overlook Flag, Overlook Park or Flag Over the Falls, is a location in Great Falls, Montana. The hill holds the city's landmark American flag, as well as a park and visitor center.

== History ==
The planning of the flag and its site began in early 1984, and a sign and place for the flag was dedicated in Broadwater Overlook Park in March 1984. However, funding was needed for the flag and its site, so members of the Montana Air National Guard and Great Falls Board of Realtors collected funds from a toll. Sufficient funding was reached after the fundraising, and the flag arrived at Great Falls on April 18, 1984. Construction began a few months later, and the flag was planted on June 7, 1984. The flag was then raised less than a month later on July 4, 1984, for Independence Day. Several additions have been added to park, including a plaque to dedicate Cascade County veterans in 1986, a statue dedicating Lewis and Clark, a walking path, and other small projects. Currently, the flag is still maintained and sponsored by the Great Falls Board of Realtors, Montana Air National Guard, and other sponsors.

== Flag ==
A 30 ft × 50 ft (9.1 m × 15.2 m) American flag is used on the hill and is sponsored by multiple sponsors. Multiple flags are used, and seamstresses maintain and repair each flag regularly.

== Park and overlook ==
The Broadwater Overlook Park, also known as Overlook Park, contains the flagstaff. The park also contains the city's visitor center.

== Location ==
Great Falls Flag Hill is located on Overlook Drive just off of 10th Avenue South.

== Events ==
- Flag Day celebration every June 14.

== See also ==
- Malmstrom Airforce Base
