= Gibson Flats, Montana =

- Census-designated place
- Location within Montana
- Coordinates: 47°27′58″N 111°14′55″W
- Country: United States
- State: Montana
- County: Cascade

Area
  - Total: 3.34 sq mi (8.64 km^{2})
  - Land: 3.34 sq mi (8.64 km^{2})
  - Water: 0 sq mi (0.00 km^{2})
- Elevation: 3,356 ft (1,023 m)

Population (2020)
  - Total: 203
  - Density: 60.8/sq mi (23.49/km^{2})
- Time zone: UTC-7 (Mountain (MST))
  - Summer (DST): UTC-6 (MDT)
- Area code: 406
- FIPS code: 30-30625
- GNIS feature ID: 2583811

Gibson Flats is a census-designated place (CDP) in Cascade County, Montana, United States. As of the 2020 census, Gibson Flats had a population of 203. It is part of the Great Falls, Montana Metropolitan Statistical Area.

== Geography ==
Gibson Flats is located 3 miles (5 km) southeast of the center of Great Falls.

According to the United States Census Bureau, the CDP has a total area of 3.0 square miles (7.8 km^{2}), all land.

== Demographics ==
Historical population
Census	Pop.	Note	%±
2020	203		—
U.S. Decennial Census
