= Sun Prairie, Montana =

- CDP
- Location of Sun Prairie, Montana
- Coordinates: 47°32′23″N 111°30′15″W
- Country: United States
- State: Montana
- County: Cascade

Area
  - Total: 5.42 sq mi (14.03 km^{2})
  - Land: 5.30 sq mi (13.72 km^{2})
  - Water: 0.12 sq mi (0.31 km^{2})
- Elevation: 3,343 ft (1,019 m)

Population (2020)
  - Total: 1,615
  - Density: 304.9/sq mi (117.72/km^{2})
- Time zone: UTC-7 (Mountain (MST))
  - Summer (DST): UTC-6 (MDT)
- Area code: 406
- FIPS code: 30-72380
- GNIS feature ID: 2410026

Sun Prairie is a census-designated place (CDP) in Cascade County, Montana, United States. As of the 2020 census, Sun Prairie had a population of 1,615. It is part of the Great Falls Metropolitan Statistical Area.

== Geography ==
Sun Prairie is located on Interstate 15, the Sun River flows south of town.

According to the United States Census Bureau, the CDP has a total area of 5.4 square miles (14.0 km^{2}), of which 5.3 square miles (13.8 km^{2}) is land and 0.08 square miles (0.2 km^{2}), or 1.75%, is water.

== Demographics ==
Historical population
Census	Pop.	Note	%±
2020	1,615		—
U.S. Decennial Census

=== 2020 census ===
As of the 2020 census, Sun Prairie had a population of 1,615. The median age was 42.0 years. 24.3% of residents were under the age of 18 and 18.0% of residents were 65 years of age or older. For every 100 females there were 107.1 males, and for every 100 females age 18 and over there were 101.5 males age 18 and over.

0.0% of residents lived in urban areas, while 100.0% lived in rural areas.

There were 628 households in Sun Prairie, of which 31.2% had children under the age of 18 living in them. Of all households, 52.7% were married-couple households, 17.4% were households with a male householder and no spouse or partner present, and 20.1% were households with a female householder and no spouse or partner present. About 25.0% of all households were made up of individuals and 12.7% had someone living alone who was 65 years of age or older.

There were 673 housing units, of which 6.7% were vacant. The homeowner vacancy rate was 2.2% and the rental vacancy rate was 6.4%.

Racial composition as of the 2020 census
Race	Number	Percent
White	1,357	84.0%
Black or African American	9	0.6%
American Indian and Alaska Native	75	4.6%
Asian	8	0.5%
Native Hawaiian and Other Pacific Islander	1	0.1%
Some other race	15	0.9%
Two or more races	150	9.3%
Hispanic or Latino (of any race)	63	3.9%

=== 2000 census ===
As of the census of 2000, there were 1,772 people, 626 households, and 503 families residing in the CDP. The population density was 297.5 inhabitants per square mile (114.9/km^{2}). There were 656 housing units at an average density of 110.1 per square mile (42.5/km^{2}). The racial makeup of the CDP was 91.59% White, 0.45% African American, 4.57% Native American, 0.73% Asian, 0.11% from other races, and 2.54% from two or more races. Hispanic or Latino of any race were 1.52% of the population.

There were 626 households, out of which 39.8% had children under the age of 18 living with them, 65.7% were married couples living together, 9.7% had a female householder with no husband present, and 19.5% were non-families. 14.4% of all households were made up of individuals, and 2.7% had someone living alone who was 65 years of age or older. The average household size was 2.83 and the average family size was 3.15.

In the CDP, the population was spread out, with 31.0% under the age of 18, 5.8% from 18 to 24, 30.6% from 25 to 44, 24.7% from 45 to 64, and 8.0% who were 65 years of age or older. The median age was 35 years. For every 100 females, there were 108.0 males. For every 100 females age 18 and over, there were 101.5 males.

The median income for a household in the CDP was $42,353, and the median income for a family was $44,286. Males had a median income of $34,271 versus $20,833 for females. The per capita income for the CDP was $15,685. About 15.1% of families and 13.9% of the population were below the poverty line, including 18.9% of those under age 18 and 4.1% of those age 65 or over.
