= Black Eagle, Montana =

- CDP
- Location of Black Eagle, Montana
- Coordinates: 47°31′42″N 111°15′52″W
- Country: United States
- State: Montana
- County: Cascade

Area
  - Total: 1.73 sq mi (4.48 km^{2})
  - Land: 1.54 sq mi (3.99 km^{2})
  - Water: 0.19 sq mi (0.49 km^{2})
- Elevation: 3,471 ft (1,058 m)

Population (2020)
  - Total: 949
  - Density: 615.7/sq mi (237.71/km^{2})
- Time zone: UTC-7 (Mountain (MST))
  - Summer (DST): UTC-6 (MDT)
- ZIP code: 59414
- Area code: 406
- FIPS code: 30-07150
- GNIS feature ID: 2407855

Black Eagle is a census-designated place (CDP) in Cascade County, Montana, United States. As of the 2020 census, Black Eagle had a population of 949. It is a suburb of Great Falls.

== History ==
With early activity from smelters and refineries, Black Eagle was first called "Little Chicago". This was a reference to the industrialized nature of the town. When the post office was established in 1917, the name of the town officially became Black Eagle. It was named for the Black Eagle Falls on the Missouri River, which were named by Capt. Meriwether Lewis.

Construction of the Boston & Montana smelter, which formed the town's skyline, began in 1891. It was demolished on September 18, 1982.

== Geography ==
Black Eagle is located near Giant Springs State Park.

According to the United States Census Bureau, the CDP has a total area of 1.7 square miles (4.4 km^{2}), of which 1.5 square miles (3.9 km^{2}) is land and 0.1 square miles (0.26 km^{2}) (8.33%) is water.

== Demographics ==
Historical population
Census	Pop.	Note	%±
2020	949		—
U.S. Decennial Census

As of the census of 2000, there were 914 people, 418 households, and 237 families residing in the CDP. The population density was 590.3 inhabitants per square mile (227.9/km^{2}). There were 458 housing units at an average density of 295.8 per square mile (114.2/km^{2}). The racial makeup of the CDP was 88.07% White, 0.55% African American, 7.66% Native American, 0.22% Asian, 0.55% from other races, and 2.95% from two or more races. Hispanic or Latino of any race were 2.52% of the population.

There were 418 households, out of which 24.4% had children under the age of 18 living with them, 38.8% were married couples living together, 12.0% had a female householder with no husband present, and 43.1% were non-families. 38.3% of all households were made up of individuals, and 11.7% had someone living alone who was 65 years of age or older. The average household size was 2.19, and the average family size was 2.86.

In the CDP, the population was spread out, with 23.9% under the age of 18, 8.6% from 18 to 24, 29.1% from 25 to 44, 24.8% from 45 to 64, and 13.6% who were 65 years of age or older. The median age was 38 years. For every 100 females, there were 105.4 males. For every 100 females age 18 and over, there were 104.7 males.

The median income for a household in the CDP was $23,529, and the median income for a family was $31,771. Males had a median income of $26,250 versus $17,321 for females. The per capita income for the CDP was $18,269. About 8.1% of families and 11.1% of the population were below the poverty line, including 10.1% of those under age 18 and 3.8% of those age 65 or over.

== Climate ==
According to the Köppen Climate Classification system, Black Eagle has a semi-arid climate, abbreviated "BSk" on climate maps.
