= List of U.S. states and territories by GDP =

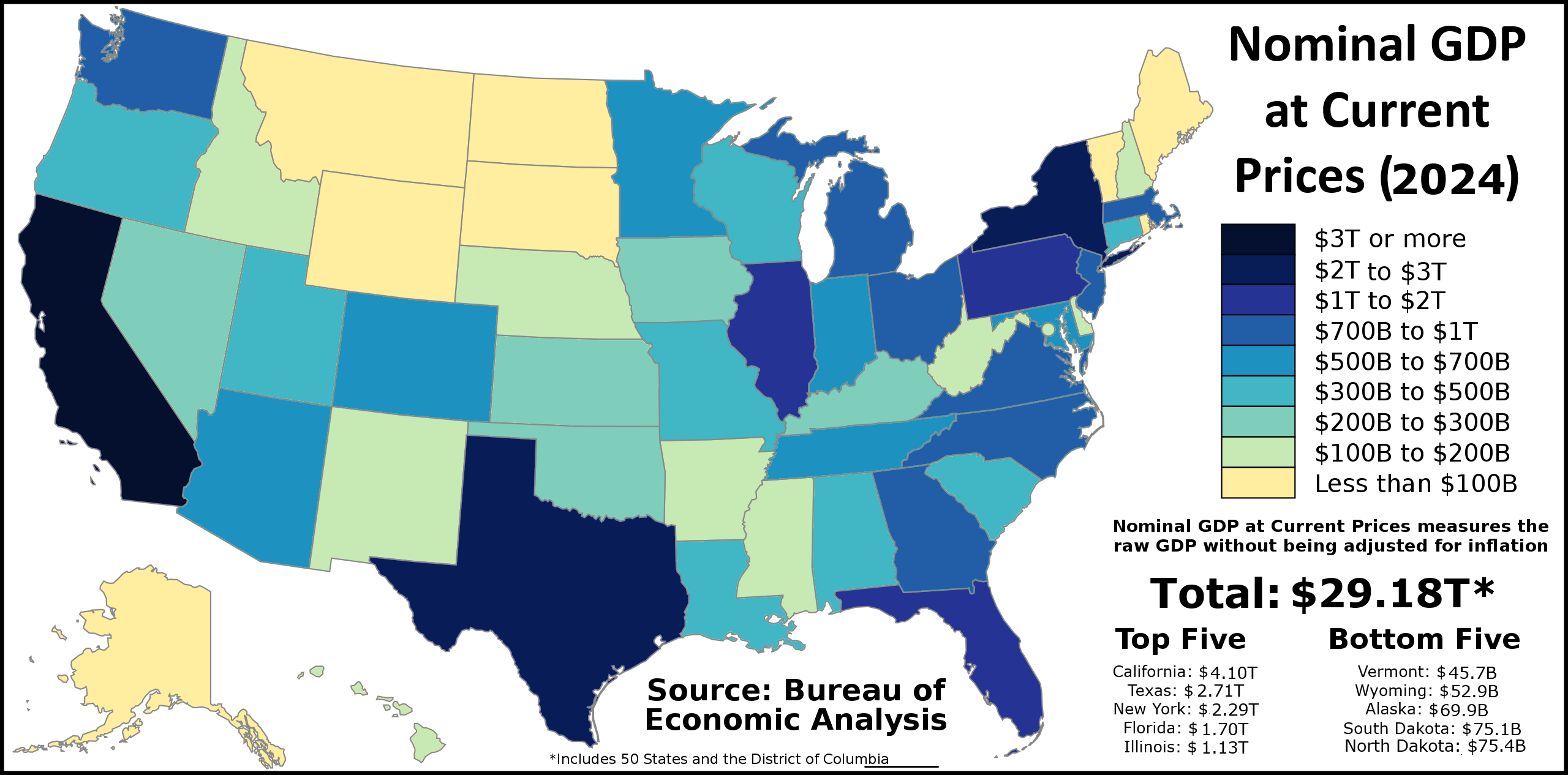
The GDP of each U.S. state and the District of Columbia in 2024 according to the U.S. Bureau of Economic Analysis

The GDP per capita of each U.S. state and the District of Columbia in 2021 according to the U.S. Bureau of Economic Analysis and the U.S. Census Bureau

Real GDP growth rate by U.S. state in 2021 according to the U.S. Bureau of Economic Analysis

This is a list of U.S. states and territories by gross domestic product (GDP). This article presents the 50 U.S. states and the District of Columbia and their nominal GDP at current prices.

The data source for the list is the Bureau of Economic Analysis (BEA) in 2025. The BEA defined GDP by state as "the sum of value added from all industries in the state."

Overall, in the calendar year 2025, the United States' Nominal GDP at Current Prices totaled at $30.762 trillion, as compared to $29.298 trillion in 2024.

The three U.S. states with the highest GDPs were California ($4.251 trillion), Texas ($2.904 trillion), and New York ($2.468 trillion). The three U.S. states with the lowest GDPs were Vermont ($48.350 billion), Wyoming ($52.622 billion), and Alaska ($75.012 billion).

GDP per capita also varied widely throughout the United States in 2025, with New York ($123,369), Massachusetts ($114,635), and Washington (state) ($111,860) recording the three highest GDP per capita figures in the U.S., while Mississippi ($55,877), West Virginia ($61,873), and Arkansas ($63,703) recorded the three lowest GDP per capita figures in the U.S. The District of Columbia, though, recorded a GDP per capita figure far higher than any U.S. state in 2025 at $277,689.

== 50 states and Washington, D.C. ==
>$3.0 trillion $2.0 trillion - $3.0 trillion $1.0 trillion - $2.0 trillion $500 billion - $1.0 trillion $250 - $500 billion <$250 billion

The following list includes the annual nominal gross domestic product for each of the 50 U.S. states and the national capital of Washington, D.C. and the GDP change and GDP per capita as of 2025. The total for the United States in this table excludes U.S. territories. The raw GDP data below is measured in millions of U.S. dollars.

| State or federal district | Nominal GDP at current prices (millions of U.S. dollars) | | | Nominal GDP change (2024–2025) | | Real GDP growth (2024–2025) | Population (2025) | Nominal GDP per capita | |
| State or federal district | 2024 | 2025 | % GDP share (2025) | Nominal GDP change (2024–2025) | | Real GDP growth (2024–2025) | Population (2025) | 2024 | 2025 |
|---|---|---|---|---|---|---|---|---|---|
| Alabama | 325,345 | 341,154 | 1.11% | 15,809 | ▲4.9% | ▲2.0% | 5,193,088 | $61,846 | $65,694 |
| Alaska | 71,567 | 75,012 | 0.24% | 3,445 | ▲4.8% | ▲2.8% | 737,270 | $95,147 | $101,742 |
| Arizona | 570,089 | 598,189 | 1.94% | 28,100 | ▲4.9% | ▲2.0% | 7,623,818 | $73,203 | $78,463 |
| Arkansas | 188,340 | 198,422 | 0.65% | 10,082 | ▲5.4% | ▲2.2% | 3,114,791 | $60,276 | $63,703 |
| California | 4,048,108 | 4,250,841 | 13.82% | 202,733 | ▲5.0% | ▲2.5% | 39,355,309 | $104,916 | $108,012 |
| Colorado | 557,633 | 584,324 | 1.90% | 26,691 | ▲4.8% | ▲2.1% | 6,012,561 | $93,026 | $97,184 |
| Connecticut | 356,835 | 376,455 | 1.22% | 19,620 | ▲5.5% | ▲2.4% | 3,688,496 | $100,235 | $102,062 |
| Delaware | 110,972 | 117,218 | 0.38% | 6,246 | ▲5.6% | ▲2.3% | 1,059,952 | $98,055 | $110,588 |
| District of Columbia | 184,298 | 192,618 | 0.63% | 8,320 | ▲4.5% | ▲0.4% | 693,645 | $263,220 | $277,689 |
| Florida | 1,726,710 | 1,834,641 | 5.96% | 107,931 | ▲6.3% | ▲3.1% | 23,462,518 | $73,784 | $78,195 |
| Georgia | 881,508 | 924,829 | 3.01% | 43,321 | ▲4.9% | ▲1.9% | 11,302,748 | $78,754 | $81,823 |
| Hawaii | 117,627 | 124,608 | 0.41% | 6,981 | ▲5.9% | ▲2.5% | 1,432,820 | $80,325 | $86,967 |
| Idaho | 129,018 | 135,553 | 0.44% | 6,535 | ▲5.1% | ▲2.0% | 2,029,733 | $63,991 | $66,784 |
| Illinois | 1,148,106 | 1,201,996 | 3.91% | 53,890 | ▲4.7% | ▲1.6% | 12,719,141 | $90,449 | $94,503 |
| Indiana | 519,517 | 545,234 | 1.77% | 25,717 | ▲5.0% | ▲2.5% | 6,973,333 | $76,004 | $78,188 |
| Iowa | 265,795 | 277,110 | 0.90% | 11,315 | ▲4.3% | ▲1.2% | 3,238,387 | $79,631 | $85,570 |
| Kansas | 230,522 | 241,378 | 0.78% | 10,856 | ▲4.7% | ▲2.0% | 2,977,220 | $79,513 | $81,075 |
| Kentucky | 295,375 | 306,897 | 1.00% | 11,522 | ▲3.9% | ▲1.0% | 4,606,864 | $64,110 | $66,617 |
| Louisiana | 329,173 | 340,080 | 1.11% | 10,907 | ▲3.3% | ▲1.1% | 4,618,189 | $71,642 | $73,639 |
| Maine | 99,174 | 102,844 | 0.33% | 3,670 | ▲3.7% | ▲0.6% | 1,414,874 | $69,803 | $72,688 |
| Maryland | 546,028 | 568,140 | 1.85% | 22,112 | ▲4.1% | ▲0.7% | 6,265,347 | $87,021 | $90,680 |
| Massachusetts | 778,523 | 820,105 | 2.67% | 41,582 | ▲5.3% | ▲2.4% | 7,154,084 | $110,561 | $114,635 |
| Michigan | 702,467 | 730,068 | 2.37% | 27,601 | ▲3.9% | ▲1.2% | 10,127,884 | $71,083 | $72,085 |
| Minnesota | 507,688 | 531,465 | 1.73% | 23,777 | ▲4.7% | ▲1.6% | 5,830,405 | $86,371 | $91,154 |
| Mississippi | 158,192 | 165,069 | 0.54% | 6,877 | ▲4.4% | ▲1.6% | 2,954,160 | $53,061 | $55,877 |
| Missouri | 448,714 | 468,470 | 1.52% | 19,756 | ▲4.4% | ▲1.3% | 6,270,541 | $72,108 | $74,710 |
| Montana | 78,441 | 82,358 | 0.27% | 3,917 | ▲5.0% | ▲2.2% | 1,144,694 | $66,379 | $71,947 |
| Nebraska | 189,243 | 198,073 | 0.64% | 8,830 | ▲4.7% | ▲1.4% | 2,018,006 | $93,145 | $98,153 |
| Nevada | 269,011 | 281,454 | 0.91% | 12,443 | ▲4.6% | ▲1.7% | 3,282,188 | $80,880 | $85,752 |
| New Hampshire | 119,337 | 125,523 | 0.41% | 6,186 | ▲5.2% | ▲2.1% | 1,415,342 | $85,518 | $88,688 |
| New Jersey | 846,000 | 887,175 | 2.88% | 41,175 | ▲4.9% | ▲1.8% | 9,548,215 | $90,272 | $92,915 |
| New Mexico | 147,085 | 152,779 | 0.50% | 5,694 | ▲3.9% | ▲1.5% | 2,125,498 | $66,229 | $71,879 |
| New York | 2,322,139 | 2,467,674 | 8.02% | 145,535 | ▲6.3% | ▲2.9% | 20,002,427 | $117,332 | $123,369 |
| North Carolina | 844,209 | 893,763 | 2.91% | 49,554 | ▲5.9% | ▲2.7% | 11,197,968 | $75,876 | $79,815 |
| North Dakota | 80,058 | 81,883 | 0.27% | 1,825 | ▲2.3% | ▲0.3% | 799,358 | $95,982 | $102,436 |
| Ohio | 923,141 | 966,780 | 3.14% | 43,639 | ▲4.7% | ▲1.7% | 11,900,510 | $78,120 | $81,239 |
| Oklahoma | 263,695 | 274,421 | 0.89% | 10,726 | ▲4.1% | ▲1.5% | 4,123,288 | $64,719 | $66,554 |
| Oregon | 330,250 | 342,850 | 1.11% | 12,600 | ▲3.8% | ▲1.0% | 4,273,586 | $77,916 | $80,225 |
| Pennsylvania | 1,007,874 | 1,056,446 | 3.43% | 48,572 | ▲4.8% | ▲1.9% | 13,059,432 | $78,544 | $80,895 |
| Rhode Island | 80,381 | 83,956 | 0.27% | 3,575 | ▲4.5% | ▲1.1% | 1,114,521 | $74,594 | $75,329 |
| South Carolina | 357,074 | 378,831 | 1.23% | 21,757 | ▲6.1% | ▲3.1% | 5,570,274 | $63,711 | $68,009 |
| South Dakota | 76,796 | 80,650 | 0.26% | 3,854 | ▲5.0% | ▲1.4% | 935,094 | $80,685 | $86,248 |
| Tennessee | 561,201 | 589,818 | 1.92% | 28,617 | ▲5.1% | ▲2.1% | 7,315,076 | $75,748 | $80,630 |
| Texas | 2,769,766 | 2,904,428 | 9.44% | 134,662 | ▲4.9% | ▲2.5% | 31,709,821 | $86,987 | $91,594 |
| Utah | 299,471 | 315,973 | 1.03% | 16,502 | ▲5.5% | ▲2.8% | 3,538,904 | $86,506 | $89,286 |
| Vermont | 46,276 | 48,350 | 0.16% | 2,074 | ▲4.5% | ▲1.4% | 644,663 | $70,131 | $75,001 |
| Virginia | 761,734 | 798,448 | 2.60% | 36,714 | ▲4.8% | ▲1.7% | 8,880,107 | $86,747 | $89,914 |
| Washington | 856,014 | 894,990 | 2.91% | 38,976 | ▲4.6% | ▲2.2% | 8,001,020 | $108,468 | $111,860 |
| West Virginia | 106,475 | 109,277 | 0.36% | 2,802 | ▲2.6% | ▲0.5% | 1,766,147 | $60,783 | $61,873 |
| Wisconsin | 453,299 | 473,037 | 1.54% | 19,738 | ▲4.4% | ▲1.5% | 5,972,787 | $75,605 | $79,199 |
| Wyoming | 51,498 | 52,622 | 0.17% | 1,124 | ▲2.2% | ▲0.5% | 588,753 | $90,335 | $89,379 |
| United States | 29,298,013 | 30,762,099 | 100% | 1,464,086 | ▲5.0% | ▲2.1% | 341,784,857 | $85,810 | $90,004 |

== U.S. territories ==
The Bureau of Economic Analysis (BEA) collects GDP data for five U.S. territories (American Samoa, Guam, the Northern Mariana Islands, Puerto Rico, and the U.S. Virgin Islands) separately from the states and the District of Columbia. Data for the U.S. territories is from the World Bank for GDP, GDP per capita and the real growth.

| Territory | Nominal GDP at current prices (millions of U.S. dollars) | Real GDP growth rate | GDP per capita | Year of reference |
|---|---|---|---|---|
| Puerto Rico | 122,889 | ▲3.0% | $38,357 | 2023 |
| Guam | 6,910 | ▲5.1% | $40,807 | 2022 |
| U.S. Virgin Islands | 4,672 | ▼ −1.3% | $44,320 | 2022 |
| Northern Mariana Islands | 1,096 | ▲16.7% | $22,118 | 2022 |
| American Samoa | 871 | ▲1.8% | $19,673 | 2022 |

== U.S. states by GDP if they were sovereign states ==
An orange background indicates a U.S. state or District of Columbia.

Data for countries as in the List of countries by GDP (nominal), from World Bank, mostly year 2024. Data for U.S. states as in this article above, from the year 2024.
| Rank | U.S. state or country | GDP (millions of U.S. dollars) |
|---|---|---|
| 1 | China | 18,743,803 |
| 2 | Germany | 4,659,929 |
| 3 | California | 4,103,124 |
| 4 | Japan | 4,026,211 |
| 5 | India | 3,912,686 |
| 6 | United Kingdom | 3,643,834 |
| 7 | France | 3,162,079 |
| 8 | Texas | 2,709,393 |
| 9 | Italy | 2,372,775 |
| 10 | New York | 2,297,028 |
| 11 | Canada | 2,241,253 |
| 12 | Brazil | 2,179,412 |
| 13 | Russia | 2,173,836 |
| 14 | Mexico | 1,852,723 |
| 15 | Australia | 1,752,193 |
| 16 | Spain | 1,722,746 |
| 17 | South Korea | 1,712,793 |
| 18 | Florida | 1,705,565 |
| 19 | Indonesia | 1,396,300 |
| 20 | Turkey | 1,323,255 |
| 21 | Saudi Arabia | 1,237,530 |
| 22 | Netherlands | 1,227,544 |
| 23 | Illinois | 1,137,244 |
| 24 | Pennsylvania | 1,024,206 |
| 25 | Switzerland | 936,564 |
| 26 | Ohio | 927,740 |
| 27 | Poland | 914,696 |
| 28 | Georgia | 882,535 |
| 29 | Washington | 854,683 |
| 30 | New Jersey | 846,587 |
| 31 | North Carolina | 839,122 |
| 32 | Massachusetts | 780,666 |
| 33 | Virginia | 764,475 |
| 34 | Michigan | 719,392 |
| 35 | Belgium | 664,564 |
| 36 | Argentina | 633,267 |
| 37 | Sweden | 610,118 |
| 38 | Ireland | 577,389 |
| 39 | Colorado | 553,323 |
| 40 | Arizona | 552,167 |
| 41 | Tennessee | 549,709 |
| 42 | Singapore | 547,387 |
| 43 | Maryland | 542,766 |
| 44 | Israel | 540,380 |
| 45 | United Arab Emirates | 537,079 |
| 46 | Indiana | 527,381 |
| 47 | Thailand | 526,411 |
| 48 | Austria | 521,642 |
| 49 | Minnesota | 500,851 |
| 50 | Norway | 483,727 |
| 51 | Vietnam | 476,388 |
| 52 | Philippines | 461,618 |
| 53 | Wisconsin | 451,285 |
| 54 | Missouri | 451,201 |
| 55 | Bangladesh | 450,119 |
| 56 | Iran | 436,906 |
| 57 | Denmark | 429,457 |
| 58 | Malaysia | 421,972 |
| 59 | Colombia | 418,542 |
| 60 | Hong Kong | 407,107 |
| 61 | South Africa | 400,261 |
| 62 | Egypt | 389,050 |
| 63 | Romania | 382,768 |
| 64 | Pakistan | 373,072 |
| 65 | Connecticut | 365,723 |
| 66 | South Carolina | 349,965 |
| 67 | Czech Republic | 345,037 |
| 68 | Oregon | 331,029 |
| 69 | Chile | 330,267 |
| 70 | Louisiana | 327,782 |
| 71 | Alabama | 321,238 |
| 72 | Portugal | 308,683 |
| 73 | Utah | 300,904 |
| 74 | Finland | 299,836 |
| 75 | Kentucky | 293,021 |
| 76 | Peru | 289,222 |
| 77 | Kazakhstan | 288,406 |
| 78 | Iraq | 279,641 |
| 79 | Oklahoma | 265,779 |
| 80 | Algeria | 263,620 |
| 81 | Nevada | 260,728 |
| 82 | New Zealand | 260,236 |
| 83 | Greece | 257,145 |
| 84 | Iowa | 257,021 |
| 85 | Kansas | 234,673 |
| 86 | Hungary | 222,905 |
| 87 | Qatar | 217,983 |
| 88 | Ukraine | 190,741 |
| 89 | Arkansas | 188,723 |
| 90 | Nigeria | 187,760 |
| 91 | Nebraska | 185,411 |
| 92 | District of Columbia | 184,916 |
| 93 | Ethiopia | 163,698 |
| 94 | Kuwait | 160,227 |
| 95 | Mississippi | 157,491 |
| 96 | Morocco | 154,431 |
| 97 | Slovakia | 141,776 |
| 98 | New Mexico | 140,542 |
| 99 | Idaho | 128,132 |
| 100 | Puerto Rico | 125,842 |
| 101 | Ecuador | 124,676 |
| 102 | Kenya | 124,499 |
| 103 | Dominican Republic | 124,282 |
| 104 | New Hampshire | 121,189 |
| 105 | Hawaii | 115,627 |
| 106 | Uzbekistan | 114,965 |
| 107 | Guatemala | 113,200 |
| 108 | Bulgaria | 112,212 |
| 109 | West Virginia | 107,660 |
| 110 | Oman | 106,943 |
| 111 | Delaware | 103,253 |
| 112 | Sri Lanka | 98,963 |
| 113 | Maine | 98,606 |
| 114 | Costa Rica | 95,350 |
| 115 | Luxembourg | 93,197 |
| 116 | Croatia | 92,526 |
| 117 | Serbia | 89,084 |
| 118 | Ivory Coast | 86,538 |
| 119 | Panama | 86,260 |
| 120 | Lithuania | 84,869 |
| 121 | Ghana | 82,825 |
| 122 | Rhode Island | 82,493 |
| 123 | Uruguay | 80,962 |
| 124 | Angola | 80,397 |
| 125 | Tanzania | 78,780 |
| 126 | Montana | 75,999 |
| 127 | Belarus | 75,962 |
| 128 | North Dakota | 75,399 |
| 129 | South Dakota | 75,179 |
| 130 | Azerbaijan | 74,316 |
| 131 | Myanmar | 74,080 |
| 132 | Slovenia | 72,485 |
| 133 | DR Congo | 70,749 |
| 134 | Alaska | 69,969 |
| 135 | Turkmenistan | 64,240 |
| 136 | Uganda | 53,652 |
| 137 | Tunisia | 53,410 |
| 138 | Jordan | 53,352 |
| 139 | Wyoming | 52,946 |
| 140 | Cameroon | 51,327 |
| 141 | Macau | 50,183 |
| 142 | Sudan | 49,910 |
| 143 | Bolivia | 49,668 |
| 144 | Bahrain | 47,737 |
| 145 | Libya | 46,636 |
| 146 | Cambodia | 46,353 |
| 147 | Vermont | 45,707 |
| 148 | Paraguay | 44,458 |

== U.S. states by GDP per capita if they were sovereign states ==
An orange background indicates a U.S. state or District of Columbia.

Data for countries as in the List of countries by GDP (nominal) per capita from World Bank, mostly year 2024. Data for U.S. states as in this article above, from the year 2024.
| Rank | U.S. state or country or territory | GDP (U.S. dollars) |
|---|---|---|
| 1 | District of Columbia | 263,220 |
| 2 | Monaco | 256,581 |
| 3 | Liechtenstein | 207,973 |
| 4 | Bermuda | 138,935 |
| 5 | Luxembourg | 137,516 |
| 6 | New York | 117,332 |
| 7 | Massachusetts | 110,561 |
| 8 | Washington | 108,468 |
| 9 | Ireland | 107,316 |
| 10 | California | 104,916 |
| 11 | Switzerland | 103,670 |
| 12 | Connecticut | 100,235 |
| 13 | Delaware | 98,055 |
| 14 | Cayman Islands | 97,750 |
| 15 | North Dakota | 95,982 |
| 16 | Alaska | 95,147 |
| 17 | Nebraska | 93,145 |
| 18 | Colorado | 93,026 |
| 19 | Singapore | 90,674 |
| 20 | Illinois | 90,449 |
| 21 | Wyoming | 90,335 |
| 22 | New Jersey | 90,272 |
| 23 | Isle of Man | 88,329 |
| 24 | Maryland | 87,021 |
| 25 | Texas | 86,987 |
| 26 | Norway | 86,810 |
| 27 | Virginia | 86,747 |
| 28 | Utah | 86,506 |
| 29 | Minnesota | 86,371 |
| 30 | New Hampshire | 85,518 |
| 31 | Iceland | 82,704 |
| 32 | Nevada | 80,880 |
| 33 | South Dakota | 80,685 |
| 34 | Hawaii | 80,325 |
| 35 | Iowa | 79,631 |
| 36 | Kansas | 79,513 |
| 37 | Georgia | 78,754 |
| 38 | Pennsylvania | 78,544 |
| 39 | Ohio | 78,120 |
| 40 | Oregon | 77,916 |
| 41 | Qatar | 76,276 |
| 42 | Indiana | 76,004 |
| 43 | North Carolina | 75,876 |
| 44 | Tennessee | 75,748 |
| 45 | Wisconsin | 75,605 |
| 46 | Rhode Island | 74,594 |
| 47 | Channel Islands | 74,589 |
| 48 | Florida | 73,784 |
| 49 | Arizona | 73,203 |
| 50 | Macau | 73,047 |
| 51 | Missouri | 72,108 |
| 52 | Denmark | 71,852 |
| 53 | Faroe Islands | 71,774 |
| 54 | Louisiana | 71,642 |
| 55 | Michigan | 71,083 |
| 56 | Vermont | 70,131 |
| 57 | Maine | 69,803 |
| 58 | Netherlands | 68,219 |
| 59 | Montana | 66,379 |
| 60 | New Mexico | 66,229 |
| 61 | Oklahoma | 64,719 |
| 62 | Australia | 64,408 |
| 63 | Kentucky | 64,110 |
| 64 | Idaho | 63,991 |
| 65 | South Carolina | 63,711 |
| 66 | Alabama | 61,846 |
| 67 | West Virginia | 60,783 |
| 68 | Arkansas | 60,276 |
| 69 | Greenland | 58,499 |
| 70 | Sweden | 57,723 |
| 71 | Austria | 56,833 |
| 72 | Germany | 55,800 |
| 73 | Belgium | 55,723 |
| 74 | Canada | 54,283 |
| 75 | San Marino | 54,265 |
| 76 | Israel | 54,177 |
| 77 | Hong Kong | 54,107 |
| 78 | Finland | 53,189 |
| 79 | Mississippi | 53,061 |
| 80 | United Kingdom | 52,637 |

== See also ==
- List of countries by GDP (nominal)
- Economy of the United States
- List of U.S. states by adjusted per capita personal income (2022)
- List of U.S. states and territories by economic growth rate
- List of U.S. states and territories by GDP per capita
- List of U.S. state economies
- List of cities by GDP
- List of U.S. metropolitan areas by GDP
- List of U.S. metropolitan areas by GDP per capita
- Thank God for Mississippi
