= Gross metropolitan product =

Monetary measure

Gross metropolitan product (GMP) is a monetary measure that calculates the total economic output of a statistical metropolitan unit during a specific time period. It represents the market value of all final goods and services produced within the unit, similar to how GDP measures national economic output.

== European Union ==
GMP is calculated annually by the Eurostat for NUTS 3-based metropolitan regions.

== United States ==
GMP is calculated annually by the Bureau of Economic Analysis within the United States Department of Commerce. This is done only for metropolitan statistical areas and not for micropolitan statistical areas, metropolitan divisions, combined statistical areas, and BEA economic areas.

== See also ==
- Gross regional domestic product
- Gross regional product
- List of cities by GDP
- List of EU metropolitan areas by GDP
- List of European Union regions by GDP
- List of NUTS regions in the European Union by GDP
- List of U.S. metropolitan areas by GDP
- List of U.S. metropolitan areas by GDP per capita
