= Mill Coulee Creek =

Stream in Montana, United States

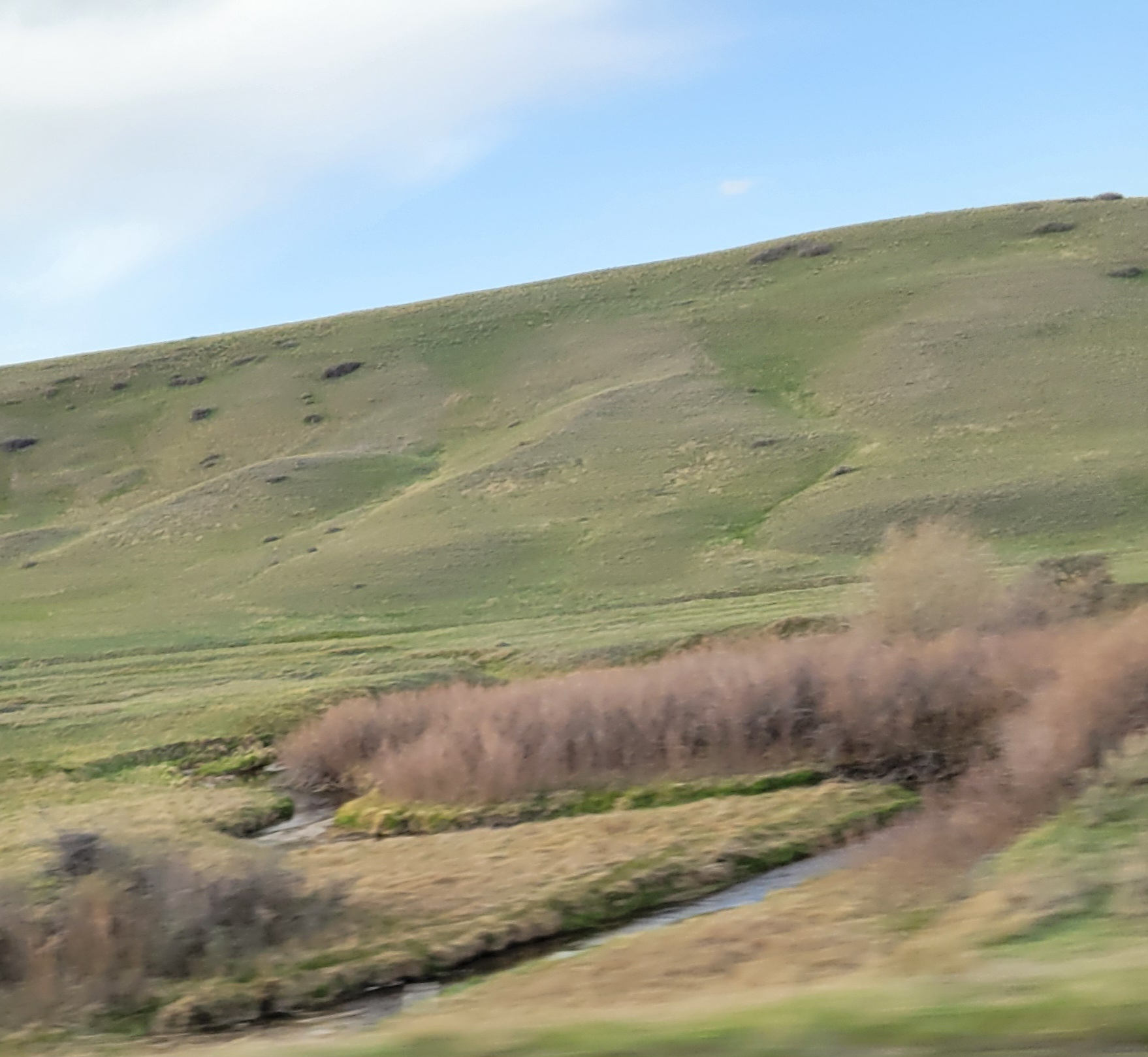
- Mill Coulee Creek

Location
- Country: United States
- State: Montana
- County: Cascade County

Physical characteristics
- Source
  - coordinates: 47.552080°N 111.793003°W
- Mouth
  - location: Sun River
  - coordinates: 47.52861°N 111.68614°W

Milll Coulee Creek is a stream in the U.S. state of Montana in Cascade County. The creek flows seven miles east from its source near Ashuelot Hill to Junction 200 near Sun River, Montana, then south into the Sun River.

== Species ==
The Montana Department of Fish, Wildlife and Parks has identified seven species of fish in the creek: brook trout, brown trout, longnose dace, longnose sucker, mottled sculpin, rainbow trout and white sucker.

== See also ==
- Sun River, Montana
- Sun River
- U.S. Route 89 in Montana
- Fairfield, Montana
- Great Falls, Montana
