= Gross regional domestic product =

Statistics that measures the size of a region's economy

Gross regional domestic product (GRDP), gross domestic product of region (GDPR), or gross state product (GSP) is a statistic that measures the size of a region's economy. It is the aggregate of gross value added (GVA) of all resident producer units in the region, and analogous to national gross domestic product. The GRDP includes regional estimates on the three major sectors including their sub-sectors, namely:

- Raw material sector: Agriculture, animal husbandry, fishery, and forestry.
- Industry sector: Construction, electricity, manufacturing, mining, quarrying, and water.
- Service sector: Communication, finance, private government services, property management, real estate sales, storage, trade, and transport.

"The GRDP is usually presented in nominal and real terms. Nominal GRDP measures the value of the outputs of the economy at current prices. Real GRDP referred to as GRDP at constant prices, measures the value of an economy's output using the prices of a fixed base year. The real GRDP is useful in capturing real output growth since inflationary effects have been removed. It is, therefore, the most widely used measure of real income."

== Lists ==
- List of first-level administrative divisions by GRDP
- List of Chinese provincial-level divisions by GDP
- List of Chinese provincial-level divisions by GDP per capita
- List of cities by GDP
- List of EU metropolitan regions by GDP
- List of European Union regions by GDP
- List of German states by GRDP
- List of Indian states and union territories by GDP
- List of Indian states and union territories by GDP per capita
- List of Indonesian provinces by GDP
- List of Indonesian provinces by GDP per capita
- List of Italian regions by GDP
- List of NUTS regions in the European Union by GDP
- List of Russian federal subjects by GRDP
- List of United States metropolitan areas by GDP
- List of U.S. metropolitan areas by GDP per capita
- List of U.S. states and territories by GDP

== See also ==
- Gross metropolitan product
