= School for the Deaf and Blind =

School for the Deaf and Blind may refer to:

- Colorado School for the Deaf and Blind
- Florida School for the Deaf and Blind
- Hawaii School for the Deaf and the Blind
- Montana School for the Deaf & Blind
- Philippine School for the Deaf, formerly known as the School for the Deaf and Blind
- South Carolina School for the Deaf and the Blind
- Virginia School for the Deaf and the Blind

== See also ==
- Alabama Institute for the Deaf and Blind
- Arizona State Schools for the Deaf and Blind
- Utah Schools for the Deaf and the Blind
- West Virginia Schools for the Deaf and the Blind
