= Stockett, Montana =

Unincorporated community in Montana, United States

- Census-designated place and Unincorporated community
- Location within Montana Location within the United States
- Coordinates: 47°21′15″N 111°10′11″W
- Country: United States
- State: Montana
- County: Cascade

Area
  - Total: 1.57 sq mi (4.06 km^{2})
  - Land: 1.57 sq mi (4.06 km^{2})
  - Water: 0 sq mi (0.00 km^{2})
- Elevation: 3,786 ft (1,154 m)

Population (2020)
  - Total: 157
  - Density: 100.2/sq mi (38.69/km^{2})
- Time zone: UTC-7 (Mountain (MST))
  - Summer (DST): UTC-6 (MDT)
- ZIP code: 59480
- Area code: 406
- GNIS feature ID: 2583852

Stockett is a census-designated place and unincorporated community in Cascade County, Montana, United States. As of the 2020 census, Stockett had a population of 157. Stockett has a post office with ZIP code 59480.

This company town was named for Cottonwood Coal Company manager Lewis Stockett. The mines stopped operating after diesel for railroad engines and natural gas for home heating were introduced. The town remains a bedroom community for Great Falls and serves area farmers and ranchers.

== Climate ==
According to the Köppen Climate Classification system, Stockett has a semi-arid climate, abbreviated "BSk" on climate maps.

== Demographics ==
Historical population
Census	Pop.	Note	%±
2020	157		—
U.S. Decennial Census

== Education ==
Centerville Public Schools educates students from kindergarten through 12th grade. They serve the communities of Centerville, Sand Coulee, Tracy and Stockett. Centerville High School is a Class C school.
