= Cascade Colony, Montana =

- Census-designated place
- Location within Montana Location within the United States
- Coordinates: 47°26′27″N 111°49′04″W
- Country: United States
- State: Montana
- County: Cascade

Area
  - Total: 0.85 sq mi (2.21 km^{2})
  - Land: 0.85 sq mi (2.21 km^{2})
  - Water: 0 sq mi (0.00 km^{2})
- Elevation: 3,708 ft (1,130 m)

Population (2020)
  - Total: 115
  - Density: 134.5/sq mi (51.92/km^{2})
- Time zone: UTC-7 (Mountain (MST))
  - Summer (DST): UTC-6 (MDT)
- ZIP Codes: 59477 (Simms); 59483 (Sun River)
- Area code: 406
- FIPS code: 30-12783
- GNIS feature ID: 2804689

Cascade Colony is a Hutterite community and census-designated place (CDP) in Cascade County, Montana, United States. It is in the northwest part of the county along Birdtail Creek Road, 5 miles (8 km) south of Fort Shaw and 30 miles (48 km) west-southwest of Great Falls. 4,639-foot (1,414 m) Shaw Butte rises above the community to the northwest.

Cascade Colony was first listed as a CDP prior to the 2020 census. As of the 2020 census, Cascade Colony had a population of 115.

== Demographics ==
Historical population
Census	Pop.	Note	%±
2020	115		—
U.S. Decennial Census
