= Economy in Papua =

The Papuan economy is an analysis of economic progress from various fields and an increase in the quality of the welfare of the Papuan people.

According to the Regional Development Planning Agency (Bappeda) 2018, economic growth in Papua and West Papua Provinces were getting better.

The massive development in Papua and West Papua Provinces has been carried out since 2002. The increase in development is in the line with the large allocation of Special Autonomy (Otsus) funds and the Additional Infrastructure Fund which has continued to increase from year to year. In 2019, the government budgeted special autonomy funds for Papua Province amounting to IDR 5.85 trillion and West Papua Province IDR 2.51 trillion To accelerate development, the government also disbursed an Additional Infrastructure Fund (DTI) of Rp. 2.82 trillion for Papua and Rp. 1.44 trillion for West Papua in 2019. So that the total Otsus and DTI funds that have been budgeted for the two easternmost provinces of Indonesia from 2002 to 2019 around IDR 85.85 trillion and IDR 28.37 trillion.

== Economic Growth ==
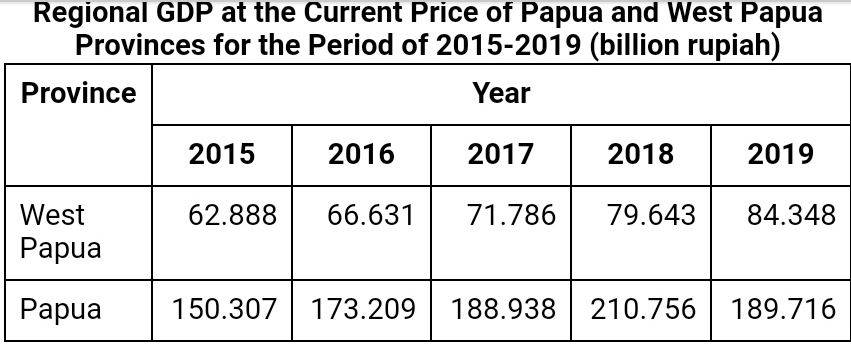

Gross Regional Domestic Product (Regional GDP) is an important indicator to determine the rate of economic growth in a region. Regional GDP based on the current prices of Papua and West Papua Provinces during the 2015-2019 period continues to increase.
