= Fair Haven Colony, Montana =

- Census-designated place
- Location within Montana Location within the United States
- Coordinates: 47°24′17″N 111°37′32″W
- Country: United States
- State: Montana
- County: Cascade

Area
  - Total: 0.41 sq mi (1.05 km^{2})
  - Land: 0.41 sq mi (1.05 km^{2})
  - Water: 0 sq mi (0.00 km^{2})
- Elevation: 3,448 ft (1,051 m)

Population (2020)
  - Total: 0
  - Density: 0/sq mi (0/km^{2})
- Time zone: UTC-7 (Mountain (MST))
  - Summer (DST): UTC-6 (MDT)
- ZIP Code: 59483 (Sun River)
- Area code: 406
- FIPS code: 30-25245
- GNIS feature ID: 2804691

Fair Haven Colony is a Hutterite community and census-designated place (CDP) in Cascade County, Montana, United States. It is in the west-central part of the county, 7 miles (11 km) southwest of Ulm and 19 miles (31 km) southwest of Great Falls. As of the 2020 census, Fair Haven Colony had a population of 0.

It was first listed as a CDP prior to the 2020 census.

== Demographics ==
Historical population
Census	Pop.	Note	%±
2020	0		—
U.S. Decennial Census
