= Big Stone Colony, Montana =

- Census-designated place
- Location within Montana Location within the United States
- Coordinates: 47°24′0″N 111°12′33″W
- Country: United States
- State: Montana
- County: Cascade

Area
  - Total: 0.94 sq mi (2.44 km^{2})
  - Land: 0.94 sq mi (2.44 km^{2})
  - Water: 0 sq mi (0.00 km^{2})
- Elevation: 3,773 ft (1,150 m)

Population (2020)
  - Total: 78
  - Density: 82.8/sq mi (31.96/km^{2})
- Time zone: UTC-7 (Mountain (MST))
  - Summer (DST): UTC-6 (MDT)
- ZIP Code: 59472 (Sand Coulee)
- Area code: 406
- FIPS code: 30-06440
- GNIS feature ID: 2804688

Big Stone Colony is a Hutterite community and census-designated place (CDP) in Cascade County, Montana, United States. It is in the east-central part of the county, bordered to the east by Sand Coulee and 11 miles (18 km) south of Great Falls. As of the 2020 census, Big Stone Colony had a population of 78.

It was first listed as a CDP prior to the 2020 census.

== Demographics ==
Historical population
Census	Pop.	Note	%±
2020	78		—
U.S. Decennial Census
