= Pleasant Valley Colony =

Pleasant Valley Colony may refer to:

- Pleasant Valley Colony, Montana
- Pleasant Valley Colony, South Dakota
