= Centerville, Montana =

- Census-designated place
- Location within Montana Location within the United States
- Coordinates: 47°23′04″N 111°08′35″W
- Country: United States
- State: Montana
- County: Cascade

Area
  - Total: 0.59 sq mi (1.54 km^{2})
  - Land: 0.59 sq mi (1.54 km^{2})
  - Water: 0 sq mi (0.00 km^{2})
- Elevation: 3,484 ft (1,062 m)

Population (2020)
  - Total: 32
  - Density: 53.7/sq mi (20.72/km^{2})
- Time zone: UTC-7 (Mountain (MST))
  - Summer (DST): UTC-6 (MDT)
- ZIP Code: 59480 (Stockett)
- Area code: 406
- FIPS code: 30-13375
- GNIS feature ID: 2804690

Centerville is a census-designated place (CDP) in Cascade County, Montana, United States. As of the 2020 census, Centerville had a population of 32. It is in the east-central part of the county, in the valley of Cottonwood Creek where it joins Sand Coulee Creek, a north-flowing tributary of the Missouri River. Centerville lies along Secondary Highway 227, 2.5 miles (4.0 km) north of Stockett and 2 miles (3 km) south of Tracy. It is 14 miles (23 km) southeast of Great Falls via Highway 227 and U.S. Route 87.

== History ==
Centerville was first listed as a CDP prior to the 2020 census.

== Demographics ==
Historical population
Census	Pop.	Note	%±
2020	32		—
U.S. Decennial Census
