= Riceville, Montana =

- Census-designated place
- Location within Montana Location within the United States
- Coordinates: 47°13′13″N 110°55′35″W
- Country: United States
- State: Montana
- County: Cascade

Area
  - Total: 0.88 sq mi (2.29 km^{2})
  - Land: 0.88 sq mi (2.29 km^{2})
  - Water: 0 sq mi (0.00 km^{2})
- Elevation: 4,344 ft (1,324 m)

Population (2020)
  - Total: 36
  - Density: 40.8/sq mi (15.75/km^{2})
- Time zone: UTC-7 (Mountain (MST))
  - Summer (DST): UTC-6 (MDT)
- ZIP Code: 59412 (Belt)
- Area code: 406
- FIPS code: 30-62245
- GNIS feature ID: 2804698

Riceville is an unincorporated community and census-designated place (CDP) in Cascade County, Montana, United States. It is in the southeastern part of the county, along U.S. Route 89 in the valley of Belt Creek, at the northern edge of the Little Belt Mountains. Via US-89, Riceville is 13 miles (21 km) south of Belt, 34 miles (55 km) southeast of Great Falls, and 64 miles (103 km) north of White Sulphur Springs.

Riceville was first listed as a CDP prior to the 2020 census. As of the 2020 census, Riceville had a population of 36.

== Demographics ==
Historical population
Census	Pop.	Note	%±
2020	36		—
U.S. Decennial Census
