= Sand Coulee, Montana =

Unincorporated community in Montana, United States

- Census-designated place & Unincorporated community
- Location within Montana Location within the United States
- Coordinates: 47°24′09″N 111°10′21″W
- Country: United States
- State: Montana
- County: Cascade

Area
  - Total: 2.69 sq mi (6.96 km^{2})
  - Land: 2.69 sq mi (6.96 km^{2})
  - Water: 0 sq mi (0.00 km^{2})
- Elevation: 3,691 ft (1,125 m)

Population (2020)
  - Total: 179
  - Density: 66.6/sq mi (25.72/km^{2})
- Time zone: UTC-7 (Mountain (MST))
  - Summer (DST): UTC-6 (MDT)
- ZIP code: 59472
- Area code: 406
- GNIS feature ID: 2583842

Sand Coulee is a census-designated place and unincorporated community in Cascade County, Montana, United States. As of the 2020 census, Sand Coulee had a population of 179.

Named Giffen in 1881, after Nat McGiffen, the town’s name changed to Sand Coulee when the McGiffens left the area. In 1883 Sand Coulee Coal Company, a coal mining company, was established. Recognizing the potential, James J. Hill purchased the company and renamed it Cottonwood Coal Company. The town slowly withered when the railroad switched to diesel engines in the 1930s.

== Demographics ==
Historical population
Census	Pop.	Note	%±
2020	179		—
U.S. Decennial Census

== Education ==
Centerville Public Schools educates students from kindergarten through 12th grade. They serve the communities of Sand Coulee, Centerville, Tracy and Stockett. Centerville High School is a Class C school. They are known as the Miners.
