= List of U.S. metropolitan areas by GDP per capita =

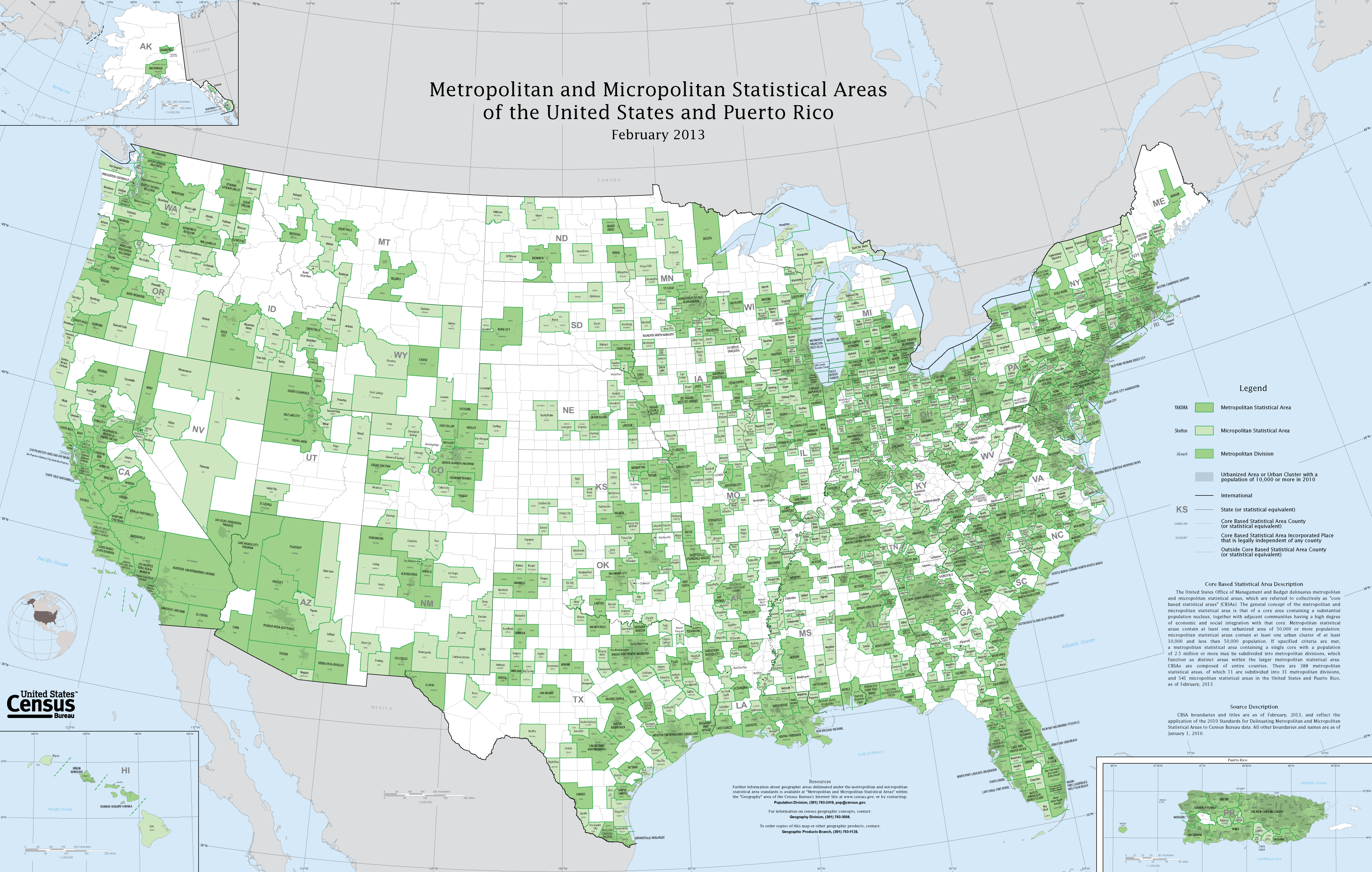
An enlargeable map of the 942 core based statistical areas (CBSAs) of the United States. The 366 metropolitan statistical areas (MSAs) are shown in medium green. The 576 U.S. micropolitan statistical area (μSAs) are shown in light green.

This is a list of U.S. metropolitan areas by their gross domestic product per capita in 2021.

== GDP per capita for US metropolitan statistical areas (in 2021 dollars) ==
Rank	City	Population	GDP (USD millions)	GDP per capita
1	Midland, TX MSA	173,180	$39,497	$228,069
2	San Jose-Sunnyvale-Santa Clara, CA MSA	1,952,185	$410,418	$210,235
3	San Francisco-Oakland-Berkeley, CA MSA	4,623,264	$668,677	$144,633
4	Seattle-Tacoma-Bellevue, WA MSA	4,011,553	$479,966	$119,646
5	Trenton-Princeton, NJ MSA	385,898	$43,633	$113,069
6	Boston-Cambridge-Newton, MA-NH MSA	4,899,932	$531,671	$108,506
7	Bridgeport-Stamford-Norwalk, CT MSA	959,768	$98,751	$102,890
8	New York-Newark-Jersey City, NY-NJ-PA MSA	19,768,458	$1,992,779	$100,806
9	Boulder, CO MSA	329,543	$33,182	$100,691
10	Washington-Arlington-Alexandria, DC-VA-MD-WV MSA	6,356,434	$607,628	$95,593
11	Salt Lake City, UT MSA	1,263,061	$118,494	$93,815
12	Durham-Chapel Hill, NC MSA	654,012	$60,814	$92,986
13	Sioux Falls, SD MSA	281,958	$26,063	$92,436
14	Bloomington, IL MSA	170,889	$15,140	$88,596
15	Lima, OH MSA	101,670	$8,962	$88,148
16	Hartford-East Hartford-Middletown, CT MSA	1,211,906	$106,507	$87,884
17	Columbus, IN MSA	82,475	$7,205	$87,360
18	Los Angeles-Long Beach-Anaheim, CA MSA	12,997,353	$1,124,682	$86,532
19	Denver-Aurora-Lakewood, CO MSA	2,972,566	$253,399	$85,246
20	Des Moines-West Des Moines, IA MSA	719,146	$61,171	$85,061
21	Elkhart-Goshen, IN MSA	206,921	$17,529	$84,713
22	Madison, WI MSA	683,183	$56,636	$82,900
23	Austin-Round Rock-Georgetown, TX MSA	2,352,426	$193,773	$82,372
24	Albany-Schenectady-Troy, NY MSA	899,286	$73,995	$82,282
25	Wheeling, WV-OH MSA	137,740	$11,239	$81,596
26	San Diego-Chula Vista-Carlsbad, CA MSA	3,286,069	$267,973	$81,548
27	Nashville-Davidson–Murfreesboro–Franklin, TN MSA	2,012,476	$163,031	$81,010
28	Minneapolis-St. Paul-Bloomington, MN-WI MSA	3,690,512	$296,969	$80,468
29	Chicago-Naperville-Elgin, IL-IN-WI MSA	9,509,934	$764,583	$80,398
30	Dubuque, IA MSA	98,718	$7,840	$79,418
31	Baltimore-Columbia-Towson, MD MSA	2,838,327	$222,967	$78,556
32	Manchester-Nashua, NH MSA	424,079	$32,729	$77,177
33	Atlanta-Sandy Springs-Alpharetta, GA MSA	6,144,050	$473,823	$77,119
34	Dallas-Fort Worth-Arlington, TX MSA	7,759,615	$598,333	$77,109
35	Charlotte-Concord-Gastonia, NC-SC MSA	2,701,046	$207,866	$76,958
36	Decatur, IL MSA	102,432	$7,856	$76,695
37	Philadelphia-Camden-Wilmington, PA-NJ-DE-MD MSA	6,228,601	$477,580	$76,675
38	Indianapolis-Carmel-Anderson, IN MSA	2,126,804	$162,062	$76,200
39	Omaha-Council Bluffs, NE-IA MSA	971,637	$73,876	$76,033
40	Cincinnati, OH-KY-IN MSA	2,259,935	$171,737	$75,992
41	Lake Charles, LA MSA	210,362	$15,791	$75,066
42	Raleigh-Cary, NC MSA	1,448,411	$108,288	$74,763
43	California-Lexington Park, MD MSA	114,468	$8,554	$74,728
44	Santa Maria-Santa Barbara, CA MSA	446,475	$33,306	$74,598
45	Houston-Pasadena-The Woodlands, TX MSA	7,206,841	$537,066	$74,522
46	Portland-Vancouver-Hillsboro, OR-WA MSA	2,511,612	$186,570	$74,283
47	Casper, WY MSA	79,555	$5,887	$73,999
48	Napa, CA MSA	136,207	$10,062	$73,873
49	Harrisburg-Carlisle, PA MSA	596,305	$43,867	$73,565
50	Vallejo, CA MSA	451,716	$33,100	$73,276
51	Columbus, OH MSA	2,151,017	$154,509	$71,831
52	Carson City, NV MSA	58,993	$4,225	$71,619
53	Pittsburgh, PA MSA	2,353,538	$168,021	$71,391
54	Reno, NV MSA	497,535	$35,471	$71,293
55	Santa Rosa-Petaluma, CA MSA	485,887	$34,450	$70,901
56	Charlottesville, VA MSA	222,688	$15,762	$70,781
57	Odessa, TX MSA	161,091	$11,399	$70,761
58	Anchorage, AK MSA	398,807	$28,210	$70,736
59	Syracuse, NY MSA	658,281	$46,414	$70,508
60	Salinas, CA MSA	437,325	$30,712	$70,227
61	Fargo, ND-MN MSA	252,136	$17,706	$70,224
62	Portland-South Portland, ME MSA	556,893	$39,089	$70,191
63	Kansas City, MO-KS MSA	2,199,490	$154,328	$70,165
64	Oxnard-Thousand Oaks-Ventura, CA MSA	839,784	$58,332	$69,461
65	Burlington-South Burlington, VT MSA	226,611	$15,669	$69,145
66	Miami-Fort Lauderdale-West Palm Beach, FL MSA	6,091,747	$417,147	$68,477
67	Kankakee, IL MSA	106,601	$7,282	$68,311
68	San Angelo, TX MSA	122,344	$8,299	$67,833
69	Huntsville, AL MSA	502,728	$34,086	$67,802
70	Fairbanks, AK MSA	95,593	$6,477	$67,756
71	Sioux City, IA-NE-SD MSA	149,265	$10,111	$67,739
72	Wausau-Weston, WI MSA	166,189	$11,250	$67,694
73	Evansville, IN-KY MSA	313,946	$21,248	$67,680
74	Iowa City, IA MSA	177,239	$11,989	$67,643
75	Oshkosh-Neenah, WI MSA	171,623	$11,586	$67,508
76	Santa Cruz-Watsonville, CA MSA	267,792	$18,076	$67,500
77	Urban Honolulu, HI MSA	1,000,890	$67,383	$67,323
78	Ithaca, NY MSA	105,162	$7,044	$66,982
79	St. Louis, MO-IL MSA	2,809,299	$187,569	$66,767
80	Green Bay, WI MSA	329,490	$21,991	$66,743
81	Waterloo-Cedar Falls, IA MSA	167,796	$11,197	$66,730
82	New Haven-Milford, CT MSA	863,700	$57,541	$66,622
83	Sacramento-Roseville-Folsom, CA MSA	2,411,428	$160,542	$66,575
84	Appleton, WI MSA	244,084	$16,202	$66,379
85	Buffalo-Niagara Falls, NY MSA	1,162,336	$76,991	$66,238
86	Sheboygan, WI MSA	117,747	$7,747	$65,794
87	Lincoln, NE MSA	342,117	$22,492	$65,744
88	Ocean City, NJ MSA	95,661	$6,279	$65,638
89	Cheyenne, WY MSA	100,863	$6,608	$65,515
90	Gainesville, GA MSA	207,369	$13,561	$65,396
91	Barnstable Town, MA MSA	232,411	$15,150	$65,186
92	Detroit–Warren–Dearborn, MI MSA	4,365,205	$283,660	$64,982
93	Greeley, CO MSA	340,036	$22,082	$64,940
94	New Orleans-Metairie, LA MSA	1,261,726	$81,829	$64,855
95	Memphis, TN-MS-AR MSA	1,336,103	$86,493	$64,735
96	Ann Arbor, MI MSA	369,390	$23,859	$64,590
97	Louisville/Jefferson County, KY-IN MSA	1,284,566	$82,866	$64,509
98	Davenport-Moline-Rock Island, IA-IL MSA	381,568	$24,603	$64,479
99	Baton Rouge, LA MSA	871,905	$56,199	$64,455
100	Crestview-Fort Walton Beach-Destin, FL MSA	293,324	$18,899	$64,430
101	Grand Island, NE MSA	76,175	$4,871	$63,945
102	Rochester, NY MSA	1,084,973	$69,341	$63,910
103	Phoenix-Mesa-Chandler, AZ MSA	4,946,145	$316,090	$63,906
104	Birmingham-Hoover, AL MSA	1,114,262	$70,874	$63,606
105	Lexington-Fayette, KY MSA	517,846	$32,851	$63,438
106	Norwich-New London, CT MSA	268,805	$17,008	$63,273
107	Kahului-Wailuku-Lahaina, HI MSA	164,221	$10,356	$63,061
108	Greenville, NC MSA	172,169	$10,841	$62,967
109	Toledo, OH MSA	644,217	$40,546	$62,938
110	Springfield, IL MSA	206,898	$13,019	$62,925
111	Grand Rapids-Kentwood, MI MSA	1,091,620	$68,401	$62,660
112	Wichita, KS MSA	647,919	$40,586	$62,641
113	Savannah, GA MSA	410,008	$25,681	$62,635
114	Wilmington, NC MSA	291,833	$18,203	$62,375
115	Charleston-North Charleston, SC MSA	813,052	$50,704	$62,363
116	Naples-Marco Island, FL MSA	385,980	$24,020	$62,231
117	Orlando-Kissimmee-Sanford, FL MSA	2,691,925	$167,279	$62,141
118	Shreveport-Bossier City, LA MSA	389,155	$24,153	$62,065
119	Jacksonville, FL MSA	1,637,666	$101,367	$61,897
120	State College, PA MSA	157,527	$9,750	$61,894
121	Billings, MT MSA	187,037	$11,570	$61,859
122	Beaumont-Port Arthur, TX MSA	395,419	$24,407	$61,724
123	Bend, OR MSA	204,801	$12,618	$61,611
124	Bismarck, ND MSA	134,417	$8,243	$61,324
125	Cedar Rapids, IA MSA	275,435	$16,853	$61,187
126	Richmond, VA MSA	1,324,062	$80,909	$61,107
127	Morgantown, WV MSA	140,745	$8,597	$61,082
128	Idaho Falls, ID MSA	162,786	$9,915	$60,908
129	St. Cloud, MN MSA	200,406	$12,202	$60,886
130	Amarillo, TX MSA	269,703	$16,313	$60,485
131	Weirton-Steubenville, WV-OH MSA	115,585	$6,966	$60,267
132	Oklahoma City, OK MSA	1,441,647	$86,662	$60,113
133	Ames, IA MSA	126,195	$7,583	$60,090
134	Wenatchee, WA MSA	123,342	$7,403	$60,020
135	Watertown-Fort Drum, NY MSA	116,295	$6,972	$59,951
136	Pittsfield, MA MSA	128,657	$7,682	$59,709
137	Longview, TX MSA	287,868	$17,134	$59,520
138	Eau Claire, WI MSA	173,317	$10,308	$59,475
139	Jefferson City, MO MSA	150,706	$8,956	$59,427
140	Mankato, MN MSA	103,612	$6,157	$59,424
141	Las Vegas-Henderson-Paradise, NV MSA	2,292,476	$136,198	$59,411
142	Virginia Beach-Norfolk-Newport News, VA-NC MSA	1,803,328	$107,067	$59,372
143	Champaign-Urbana, IL MSA	222,696	$13,219	$59,359
144	Milwaukee-Waukesha, WI MSA	1,566,487	$92,834	$59,263
145	Peoria, IL MSA	398,224	$23,599	$59,261
146	Bloomsburg-Berwick, PA MSA	82,959	$4,916	$59,258
147	Tampa-St. Petersburg-Clearwater, FL MSA	3,219,514	$190,708	$59,235
148	Fayetteville-Springdale-Rogers, AR MSA	560,709	$33,102	$59,036
149	Corpus Christi, TX MSA	422,778	$24,937	$58,984
150	Tulsa, OK MSA	1,023,988	$60,392	$58,977
151	Rochester, MN MSA	227,151	$13,390	$58,948
152	Cleveland-Elyria, OH MSA	2,075,662	$122,275	$58,909
153	Allentown-Bethlehem-Easton, PA-NJ MSA	865,310	$50,960	$58,892
154	Glens Falls, NY MSA	126,574	$7,446	$58,827
155	Salisbury, MD-DE MSA	429,223	$25,194	$58,697
156	Harrisonburg, VA MSA	135,824	$7,972	$58,694
157	Akron, OH MSA	700,015	$41,058	$58,653
158	Mount Vernon-Anacortes, WA MSA	130,696	$7,659	$58,602
159	Knoxville, TN MSA	893,412	$52,343	$58,588
160	College Station-Bryan, TX MSA	272,041	$15,896	$58,432
161	Manhattan, KS MSA	133,932	$7,818	$58,373
162	Flagstaff, AZ MSA	145,052	$8,444	$58,214
163	Walla Walla, WA MSA	62,682	$3,642	$58,103
164	Winchester, VA-WV MSA	145,155	$8,419	$58,000
165	Providence-Warwick, RI-MA MSA	1,675,774	$96,913	$57,832
166	Kennewick-Richland, WA MSA	308,293	$17,826	$57,822
167	Williamsport, PA MSA	113,605	$6,562	$57,762
168	Midland, MI MSA	83,457	$4,807	$57,599
169	Columbia, SC MSA	838,250	$48,214	$57,517
170	Bellingham, WA MSA	228,831	$13,143	$57,435
171	Panama City, FL MSA	179,168	$10,269	$57,315
172	Colorado Springs, CO MSA	762,793	$43,522	$57,056
173	Bakersfield, CA MSA	917,673	$52,293	$56,984
174	Little Rock-North Little Rock-Conway, AR MSA	750,936	$42,669	$56,821
175	Missoula, MT MSA	119,533	$6,780	$56,721
176	Columbia, MO MSA	213,123	$12,077	$56,667
177	Winston-Salem, NC MSA	681,438	$38,504	$56,504
178	Battle Creek, MI MSA	133,819	$7,528	$56,255
179	Worcester, MA-CT MSA	978,447	$54,941	$56,151
180	San Luis Obispo-Paso Robles, CA MSA	283,159	$15,899	$56,149
181	Fort Collins, CO MSA	362,533	$20,344	$56,116
182	Lafayette-West Lafayette, IN MSA	224,709	$12,537	$55,792
183	Mobile, AL MSA	428,220	$23,876	$55,756
184	Fond du Lac, WI MSA	104,362	$5,817	$55,739
185	St. Joseph, MO-KS MSA	120,424	$6,700	$55,637
186	Greenville-Anderson, SC MSA	940,774	$52,328	$55,622
187	San Antonio-New Braunfels, TX MSA	2,601,788	$144,384	$55,494
188	Altoona, PA MSA	121,767	$6,736	$55,319
189	Florence, SC MSA	199,259	$11,018	$55,295
190	Niles, MI MSA	153,101	$8,455	$55,225
191	El Centro, CA MSA	179,851	$9,912	$55,112
192	Boise, ID MSA	795,268	$43,601	$54,826
193	Tyler, TX MSA	237,186	$13,002	$54,818
194	Duluth, MN-WI MSA	290,780	$15,905	$54,698
195	Corvallis, OR MSA	96,017	$5,242	$54,594
196	Olympia-Lacey-Tumwater, WA MSA	297,977	$16,245	$54,518
197	La Crosse-Onalaska, WI-MN MSA	139,211	$7,568	$54,364
198	Lansing-East Lansing, MI MSA	540,281	$29,363	$54,348
199	Rocky Mount, NC MSA	143,535	$7,799	$54,335
200	Longview, WA MSA	111,524	$6,047	$54,222
201	Spokane-Spokane Valley, WA MSA	593,466	$32,178	$54,220
202	Dover, DE MSA	184,149	$9,984	$54,217
203	Jackson, TN MSA	180,799	$9,779	$54,088
204	Waco, TX MSA	280,428	$15,125	$53,935
205	Albuquerque, NM MSA	918,259	$49,480	$53,885
206	Gainesville, FL MSA	341,756	$18,353	$53,702
207	Kokomo, IN MSA	83,687	$4,488	$53,628
208	Hinesville, GA MSA	82,863	$4,427	$53,426
209	Spartanburg, SC MSA	335,864	$17,914	$53,337
210	Rapid City, SD MSA	141,979	$7,565	$53,283
211	Charleston, WV MSA	255,020	$13,553	$53,145
212	Athens-Clarke County, GA MSA	217,759	$11,562	$53,095
213	Owensboro, KY MSA	121,227	$6,434	$53,074
214	Scranton–Wilkes-Barre, PA MSA	567,750	$30,040	$52,911
215	Provo-Orem, UT MSA	697,141	$36,866	$52,882
216	New Bern, NC MSA	122,273	$6,436	$52,636
217	South Bend-Mishawaka, IN-MI MSA	323,695	$17,031	$52,614
218	Montgomery, AL MSA	385,798	$20,250	$52,489
219	Jackson, MS MSA	587,202	$30,785	$52,427
220	Bremerton-Silverdale-Port Orchard, WA MSA	274,314	$14,373	$52,396
221	Tallahassee, FL MSA	385,776	$20,148	$52,227
222	North Port-Sarasota-Bradenton, FL MSA	859,760	$44,746	$52,045
223	Janesville-Beloit, WI MSA	164,381	$8,530	$51,892
224	Victoria, TX MSA	98,127	$5,082	$51,790
225	Redding, CA MSA	182,139	$9,419	$51,713
226	Asheville, NC MSA	472,341	$24,350	$51,552
227	Augusta-Richmond County, GA-SC MSA	615,933	$31,718	$51,496
228	Reading, PA MSA	429,342	$22,055	$51,369
229	Bloomington, IN MSA	161,321	$8,272	$51,277
230	York-Hanover, PA MSA	458,696	$23,406	$51,027
231	Elmira, NY MSA	83,045	$4,230	$50,936
232	Laredo, TX MSA	267,945	$13,581	$50,686
233	Gulfport-Biloxi, MS MSA	418,082	$21,177	$50,653
234	Utica-Rome, NY MSA	290,211	$14,678	$50,577
235	Rockford, IL MSA	336,278	$17,005	$50,568
236	Dayton, OH MSA	813,516	$41,111	$50,535
237	Macon-Bibb County, GA MSA	233,883	$11,818	$50,530
238	Cape Coral-Fort Myers, FL MSA	787,976	$39,813	$50,526
239	Lubbock, TX MSA	325,245	$16,402	$50,430
240	Dothan, AL MSA	151,618	$7,636	$50,363
241	Canton-Massillon, OH MSA	400,525	$20,167	$50,351
242	Twin Falls, ID MSA	116,905	$5,878	$50,280
243	Fort Wayne, IN MSA	423,038	$21,268	$50,274
244	Columbus, GA-AL MSA	327,536	$16,456	$50,242
245	Binghamton, NY MSA	245,220	$12,314	$50,216
246	East Stroudsburg, PA MSA	169,273	$8,493	$50,173
247	Kalamazoo-Portage, MI MSA	261,108	$13,094	$50,148
248	Blacksburg-Christiansburg, VA MSA	165,293	$8,271	$50,038
249	Chattanooga, TN-GA MSA	567,641	$28,336	$49,919
250	Abilene, TX MSA	177,314	$8,848	$49,900
251	Danville, IL MSA	73,095	$3,645	$49,867
252	Springfield, MO MSA	481,483	$23,930	$49,701
253	Ogden-Clearfield, UT MSA	706,696	$35,071	$49,627
254	Palm Bay-Melbourne-Titusville, FL MSA	616,628	$30,589	$49,607
255	Cape Girardeau, MO-IL MSA	97,699	$4,838	$49,519
256	Saginaw, MI MSA	189,591	$9,363	$49,385
257	Fresno, CA MSA	1,013,581	$49,987	$49,317
258	Goldsboro, NC MSA	116,835	$5,761	$49,309
259	Sebastian-Vero Beach, FL MSA	163,662	$8,063	$49,266
260	Salem, OR MSA	436,283	$21,487	$49,250
261	Eugene-Springfield, OR MSA	383,189	$18,848	$49,187
262	Great Falls, MT MSA	84,511	$4,150	$49,106
263	Lancaster, PA MSA	553,652	$27,183	$49,098
264	Medford, OR MSA	223,734	$10,949	$48,938
265	Kingsport-Bristol, TN-VA MSA	308,661	$15,104	$48,934
266	Logan, UT-ID MSA	152,083	$7,425	$48,822
267	Lebanon, PA MSA	143,493	$6,911	$48,163
268	Tuscaloosa, AL MSA	268,191	$12,913	$48,149
269	Jonesboro, AR MSA	134,878	$6,494	$48,147
270	Grand Forks, ND-MN MSA	103,462	$4,981	$48,143
271	Greensboro-High Point, NC MSA	778,848	$37,466	$48,104
272	Chico, CA MSA	208,309	$10,006	$48,034
273	Jacksonville, NC MSA	206,160	$9,900	$48,021
274	Vineland-Bridgeton, NJ MSA	153,627	$7,376	$48,012
275	Modesto, CA MSA	552,999	$26,519	$47,955
276	Jackson, MI MSA	160,050	$7,651	$47,804
277	Tucson, AZ MSA	1,052,030	$50,231	$47,747
278	Roanoke, VA MSA	314,496	$15,012	$47,734
279	Wichita Falls, TX MSA	149,013	$7,096	$47,620
280	Grand Junction, CO MSA	157,335	$7,444	$47,313
281	Hanford-Corcoran, CA MSA	153,443	$7,258	$47,301
282	Lafayette, LA MSA	479,212	$22,650	$47,265
283	Enid, OK MSA	61,926	$2,926	$47,250
284	Kingston, NY MSA	182,951	$8,622	$47,127
285	Farmington, NM MSA	120,993	$5,698	$47,094
286	Pensacola-Ferry Pass-Brent, FL MSA	516,388	$24,309	$47,075
287	Dalton, GA MSA	142,799	$6,689	$46,842
288	Lawrence, KS MSA	119,363	$5,586	$46,798
289	Topeka, KS MSA	232,670	$10,884	$46,779
290	Carbondale-Marion, IL MSA	132,907	$6,206	$46,694
291	Alexandria, LA MSA	150,890	$7,037	$46,637
292	Staunton, VA MSA	125,774	$5,865	$46,631
293	Stockton, CA MSA	789,410	$36,790	$46,604
294	Pine Bluff, AR MSA	86,412	$3,996	$46,244
295	Fayetteville, NC MSA	524,588	$24,254	$46,234
296	Racine, WI MSA	196,896	$9,100	$46,217
297	Huntington-Ashland, WV-KY-OH MSA	356,581	$16,470	$46,189
298	Warner Robins, GA MSA	195,246	$8,993	$46,060
299	Terre Haute, IN MSA	184,910	$8,502	$45,979
300	Rome, GA MSA	98,771	$4,539	$45,955
301	Bowling Green, KY MSA	182,594	$8,368	$45,828
302	Riverside-San Bernardino-Ontario, CA MSA	4,653,105	$213,183	$45,815
303	Hickory-Lenoir-Morganton, NC MSA	366,441	$16,787	$45,811
304	Joplin, MO MSA	182,541	$8,319	$45,573
305	Houma-Thibodaux, LA MSA	206,212	$9,350	$45,342
306	Killeen-Temple, TX MSA	486,101	$21,967	$45,190
307	Atlantic City-Hammonton, NJ MSA	274,966	$12,407	$45,122
308	Coeur d'Alene, ID MSA	179,789	$8,112	$45,120
309	Parkersburg-Vienna, WV MSA	88,687	$4,000	$45,102
310	Brunswick, GA MSA	113,963	$5,136	$45,067
311	Fort Smith, AR-OK MSA	245,459	$10,920	$44,488
312	Yuba City, CA MSA	182,484	$8,104	$44,409
313	Clarksville, TN-KY MSA	328,304	$14,546	$44,306
314	Lawton, OK MSA	127,543	$5,636	$44,189
315	Anniston-Oxford, AL MSA	115,972	$5,108	$44,045
316	Lakeland-Winter Haven, FL MSA	753,520	$33,144	$43,986
317	Pueblo, CO MSA	169,622	$7,436	$43,839
318	Chambersburg-Waynesboro, PA MSA	156,289	$6,846	$43,803
319	Valdosta, GA MSA	149,152	$6,529	$43,774
320	St. George, UT MSA	191,226	$8,338	$43,603
321	Lynchburg, VA MSA	262,258	$11,430	$43,583
322	Springfield, MA MSA	695,305	$30,271	$43,536
323	Elizabethtown-Fort Knox, KY MSA	156,766	$6,819	$43,498
324	Yuma, AZ MSA	206,990	$8,977	$43,369
325	Madera, CA MSA	159,410	$6,907	$43,329
326	Monroe, MI MSA	155,274	$6,716	$43,253
327	Morristown, TN MSA	143,855	$6,218	$43,224
328	Albany-Lebanon, OR MSA	129,839	$5,608	$43,192
329	Visalia, CA MSA	477,054	$20,580	$43,140
330	El Paso, TX MSA	871,234	$37,507	$43,050
331	Sierra Vista-Douglas, AZ MSA	126,050	$5,399	$42,832
332	Burlington, NC MSA	173,877	$7,440	$42,789
333	Hagerstown-Martinsburg, MD-WV MSA	298,227	$12,755	$42,769
334	Myrtle Beach-Conway-North Myrtle Beach, SC-NC MSA	509,794	$21,787	$42,737
335	Flint, MI MSA	404,208	$17,234	$42,636
336	Cumberland, MD-WV MSA	94,586	$4,025	$42,554
337	Monroe, LA MSA	204,884	$8,699	$42,458
338	Cleveland, TN MSA	127,938	$5,423	$42,388
339	Sherman-Denison, TX MSA	139,336	$5,852	$41,999
340	Mansfield, OH MSA	125,195	$5,251	$41,943
341	Lewiston-Auburn, ME MSA	111,034	$4,616	$41,573
342	Grants Pass, OR MSA	88,346	$3,666	$41,496
343	Hattiesburg, MS MSA	173,078	$7,181	$41,490
344	Hilton Head Island-Bluffton, SC MSA	222,072	$9,212	$41,482
345	Gettysburg, PA MSA	104,127	$4,310	$41,392
346	Auburn-Opelika, AL MSA	177,218	$7,335	$41,390
347	Texarkana, TX-AR MSA	147,174	$6,086	$41,352
348	Daphne-Fairhope-Foley, AL MSA	239,294	$9,891	$41,334
349	Bangor, ME MSA	152,765	$6,309	$41,299
350	Lewiston, ID-WA MSA	64,851	$2,676	$41,264
351	Port St. Lucie, FL MSA	503,521	$20,762	$41,234
352	Sumter, SC MSA	135,782	$5,539	$40,793
353	The Villages, FL MSA	135,638	$5,507	$40,601
354	Bay City, MI MSA	102,985	$4,158	$40,375
355	Michigan City-La Porte, IN MSA	112,390	$4,521	$40,226
356	Beckley, WV MSA	113,698	$4,563	$40,133
357	Muncie, IN MSA	111,871	$4,486	$40,100
358	Florence-Muscle Shoals, AL MSA	151,517	$5,989	$39,527
359	Johnstown, PA MSA	132,167	$5,197	$39,321
360	Santa Fe, NM MSA	155,201	$6,082	$39,188
361	Yakima, WA MSA	256,035	$9,978	$38,971
362	Hot Springs, AR MSA	100,330	$3,907	$38,941
363	Pocatello, ID MSA	96,213	$3,732	$38,789
364	Erie, PA MSA	269,011	$10,415	$38,716
365	Muskegon, MI MSA	176,511	$6,795	$38,496
366	Springfield, OH MSA	135,633	$5,162	$38,059
367	Las Cruces, NM MSA	221,508	$8,339	$37,646
368	Decatur, AL MSA	156,758	$5,854	$37,344
369	Deltona-Daytona Beach-Ormond Beach, FL MSA	685,344	$25,516	$37,231
370	Hammond, LA MSA	135,217	$4,897	$36,216
371	Johnson City, TN MSA	208,068	$7,508	$36,084
372	Youngstown-Warren-Boardman, OH-PA MSA	538,069	$19,163	$35,614
373	Punta Gorda, FL MSA	194,843	$6,911	$35,470
374	Albany, GA MSA	147,773	$5,210	$35,257
375	Ocala, FL MSA	385,915	$12,907	$33,445
376	Homosassa Springs, FL MSA	158,083	$5,247	$33,191
377	Lake Havasu City-Kingman, AZ MSA	217,692	$7,037	$32,325
378	Merced, CA MSA	286,461	$8,986	$31,369
379	Brownsville-Harlingen, TX MSA	423,029	$13,225	$31,263
380	Gadsden, AL MSA	103,162	$3,175	$30,777
381	McAllen-Edinburg-Mission, TX MSA	880,356	$25,508	$28,975
382	Sebring-Avon Park, FL MSA	103,296	$2,894	$28,017

== See also ==
- List of U.S. states by economic growth rate
- List of U.S. metropolitan areas by GDP
