= Cascade County, Montana =

County in Montana, United States

- County
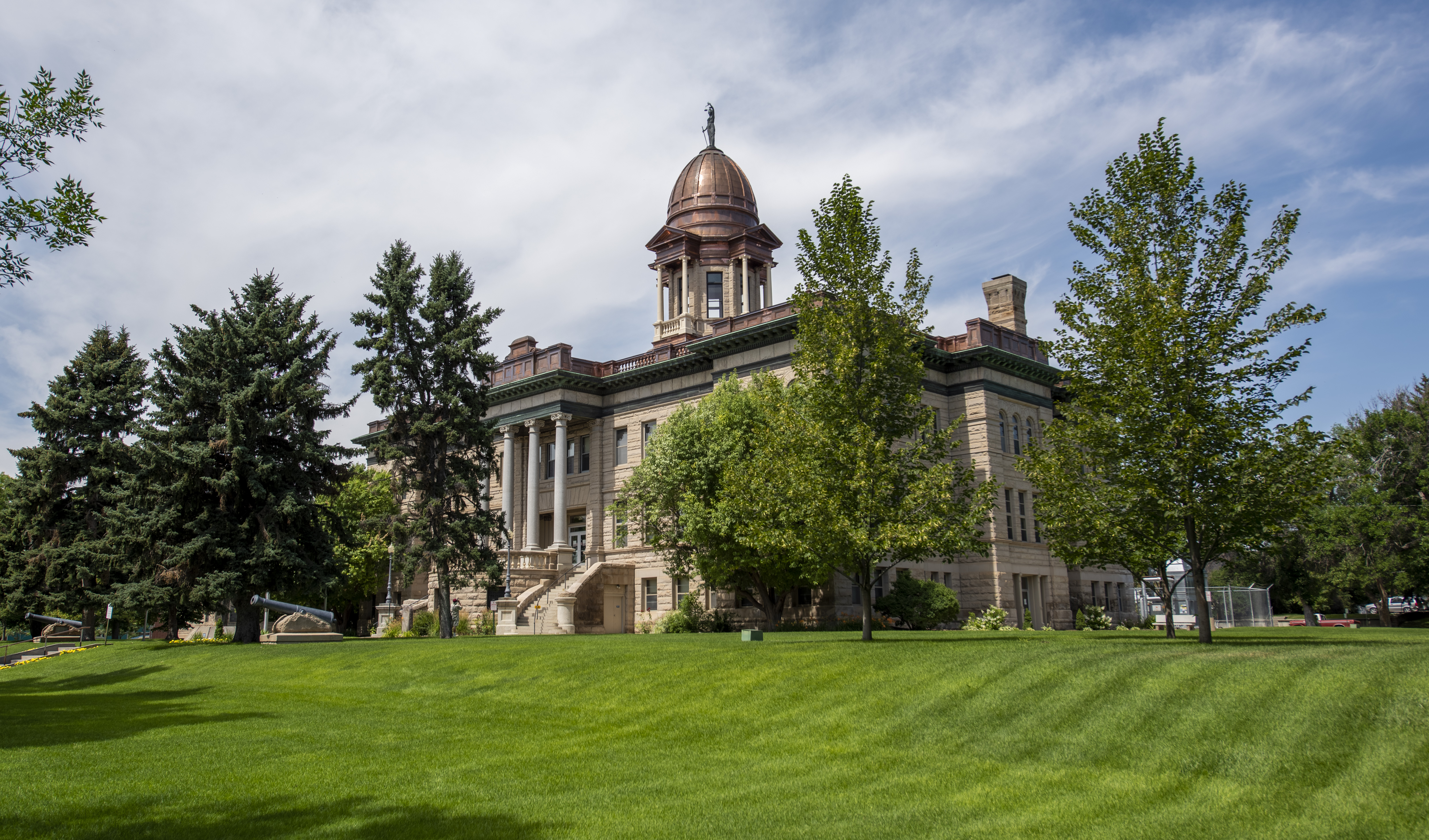
- Cascade County Courthouse

- Location within the U.S. state of Montana
- Coordinates: 47°19′N 111°21′W
- Country: United States
- State: Montana
- Founded: 1887
- Named for: Great Falls of the Missouri River
- Seat: Great Falls
- Largest city: Great Falls

Area
  - Total: 2,711 sq mi (7,020 km^{2})
  - Land: 2,698 sq mi (6,990 km^{2})
  - Water: 13 sq mi (34 km^{2}) 0.5%

Population (2020)
  - Total: 84,414
  - Estimate (2025): 85,029 ▲
  - Density: 31.5/sq mi (12.2/km^{2})
- Time zone: UTC−7 (Mountain)
  - Summer (DST): UTC−6 (MDT)
- Congressional district: 2nd
- Website: www.cascadecountymt.gov
- Montana county number 02

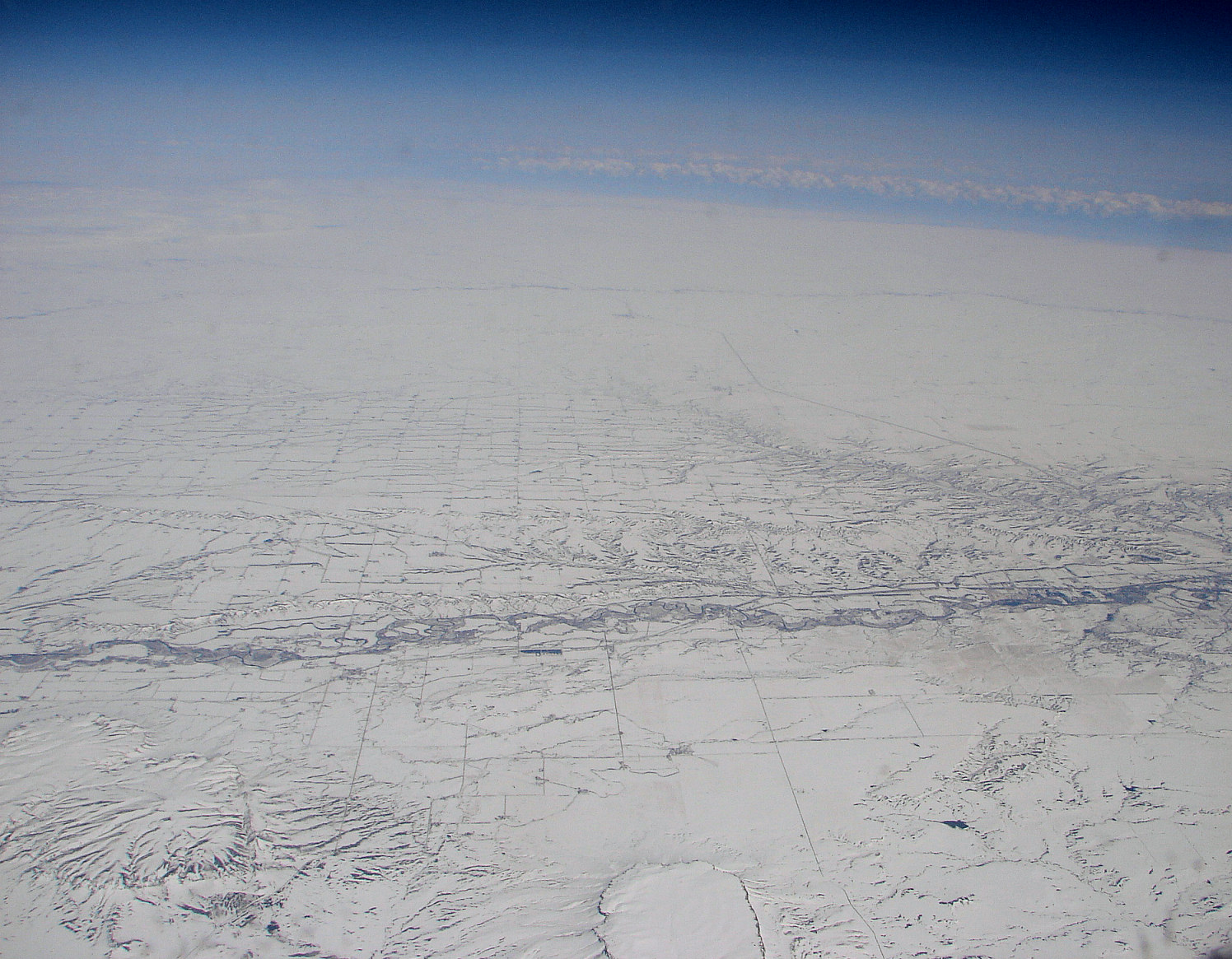
Aerial view of Cascade County and Sun River

Cascade County (cascade means waterfall in French) is a county located in the U.S. state of Montana. As of the 2020 census, the population was 84,414, making it the fifth-most populous county in Montana. Its county seat is Great Falls.

Cascade County comprises the Great Falls, MT Metropolitan Statistical Area.

== History ==
=== Early history ===
Cascade County was historically uninhabited throughout most of prehistory, with no permanent settlements aside from the occasional Salish hunting party. In roughly 1600, the Blackfeet pushed the Salish out, establishing the first permanent settlements in the area. Despite being claimed by France, the area remained unexplored by European settlers until the United States acquired the region in 1803 as part of the Louisiana Purchase.

At the time of the Lewis and Clark Expedition, Cascade County was the territory of the Blackfeet. The county was named for the falls on the Missouri River, and Lewis and Clark are believed to have first discovered the area on June 13, 1805. Despite this, the area remained uninhabited by Americans until later in the century.

=== Founding ===
After changing hands between several territories throughout the decades, Cascade County finally was placed under the jurisdiction of the Montana Territory on May 28, 1864. In 1887, territorial representative T.E. Collins proposed the creation of Cascade County from several surrounding counties including Lewis and Clark, Meagher, and Chouteau, and his bill was signed. Two years later, Montana was granted full statehood.

In 1880, entrepreneur Paris Gibson explored the area and was impressed with the possibility to harness the hydroelectric potential of the massive waterfalls in order to power and sustain a large industrial city. He returned in 1883, establishing Great Falls at the bank of the river. By 1887, the city had over 1000 residents, and the arrival of the Great Northern Railway cemented the city's position.

== Geography ==
According to the United States Census Bureau, the county has a total area of 2,711 square miles (7,020 km^{2}), of which 2,698 square miles (6,990 km^{2}) is land and 13 square miles (34 km^{2}) (0.5%) is water. The Missouri River and the Sun River flow through the county, and meet at the city of Great Falls. A portion of the Adel Mountains Volcanic Field is in the county's southwest corner. The Rocky Mountains are in the western part of the county, with the Little Belt and Highwood Mountains in the southeast.

=== Adjacent counties ===
- Teton County - northwest
- Chouteau County - northeast
- Judith Basin County - east
- Meagher County - south
- Lewis and Clark County - west

=== National protected areas ===
- Benton Lake National Wildlife Refuge
- Lewis and Clark National Forest (part)

== Demographics ==
Historical population
Census	Pop.	Note	%±
1890	8,755		—
1900	25,777		194.4%
1910	28,833		11.9%
1920	38,836		34.7%
1930	41,146		5.9%
1940	41,199		0.1%
1950	53,027		28.7%
1960	73,418		38.5%
1970	81,804		11.4%
1980	80,696		−1.4%
1990	77,691		−3.7%
2000	80,357		3.4%
2010	81,327		1.2%
2020	84,414		3.8%
2025 (est.)	85,029	▲	0.7%

=== 2020 census ===
As of the 2020 census, the county had a population of 84,414. Of the residents, 22.3% were under the age of 18 and 19.1% were 65 years of age or older; the median age was 38.9 years. For every 100 females there were 101.1 males, and for every 100 females age 18 and over there were 99.6 males. 79.5% of residents lived in urban areas and 20.5% lived in rural areas.

The racial makeup of the county was 83.2% White, 1.4% Black or African American, 4.7% American Indian and Alaska Native, 1.1% Asian, 1.3% from some other race, and 8.0% from two or more races. Hispanic or Latino residents of any race comprised 4.8% of the population.

There were 35,011 households in the county, of which 27.0% had children under the age of 18 living with them and 26.2% had a female householder with no spouse or partner present. About 32.6% of all households were made up of individuals and 14.2% had someone living alone who was 65 years of age or older.

There were 38,937 housing units, of which 10.1% were vacant. Among occupied housing units, 64.7% were owner-occupied and 35.3% were renter-occupied. The homeowner vacancy rate was 1.9% and the rental vacancy rate was 7.7%.

=== 2010 census ===
As of the 2010 census, 81,327 people, 33,809 households, and 21,403 families in the county. The population density was 30.1 inhabitants per square mile (11.6/km^{2}). There were 37,276 housing units at an average density of 13.8 per square mile (5.3/km^{2}). The county's racial makeup was 89.2% white, 4.3% American Indian, 1.2% black or African American, 0.8% Asian, 0.1% Pacific Islander, 0.6% other races, and 3.6% from two or more races. Those of Hispanic or Latino origin made up 3.3% of the population. In terms of ancestry, 28.5% were German, 17.1% were Irish, 12.3% were English, 10.3% were Norwegian, and 4.5% were American.

Of the 33,809 households, 29.8% had children under the age of 18 living with them, 48.4% were married couples living together, 10.2% had a female householder with no husband present, 36.7% were non-families, and 30.5% of all households were made up of individuals. The average household size was 2.33 and the average family size was 2.90. The median age was 38.9 years.

The median income for a household in the county was $42,389, and the median income for a family was $53,540. Males had a median income of $37,904 versus $27,944 for females. The per capita income for the county was $22,963. About 10.9% of families and 13.5% of the population were below the poverty line, including 20.4% of those under age 18 and 8.8% of those age 65 or over.

== Government and politics ==
=== Government ===
Cascade County is represented in the United States Senate by Republicans Steve Daines and Tim Sheehy. It is represented in the United States House of Representatives as part of Montana's 2nd congressional district by Republican Troy Downing. At the state level, Cascade County is represented in the Montana House of Representatives as part of house districts 19 through 26, represented by 7 Republicans and 1 Democrat. It is represented in the Montana Senate as part of senate districts 10 through 13, represented by 4 Republicans. Cascade County has an elected county commission and several elected county offices.

==== County Commissioners ====
Office	Name	Party
Commissioner, District 1	Joe Briggs	Republican
Commissioner, District 2	James Larson	Republican
Commissioner, District 3	Eric Hinebauch	Republican

County Officials

Office	Name	Party
County Attorney	Josh Racki	Republican
Clerk of Court/Jury Commissioner	Tina Henry	Republican
Treasurer	Diana Heikkila	Republican
Sheriff	Jessie Slaughter	Republican
Clerk & Recorder	Sandra Merchant	Republican

=== Politics ===
Like Lewis & Clark County to the west, Cascade County leans Republican but has voted for Democrats four times since Lyndon Johnson's landslide in 1964, usually during national landslides. Since 2012, however, the county has shifted steadily to the right, in 2024 giving Donald Trump the highest Republican margin of the vote in state history. This is in contrast to several of its fellow large counties, which tend to swing between candidates election to election.

At the state level, Cascade County often acts as a bellwether county. It has been friendlier to Democrats - Senator Max Baucus carried the county in all of his elections, and Governors Brian Schweitzer and Steve Bullock carried it in all four elections in 2004–2016. Since at least 1984, no Democrat has won in Montana without winning Cascade County, however, Republicans have occasionally won statewide without carrying the county. Cascade County frequently votes alongside Montana's larger counties in social issues, having voted to legalize abortion and recreational marijuana. In recent years, however, Republicans have made massive gains locally, sweeping Cascade County in the state legislature and flipping the county commission and several county offices in 2022, and the county is now fully Republican at the local level after further party switches.

Cascade's shift, uncommon among larger counties in the state, was largely attributed to Republican gains among union workers and concerns from local fossil fuel industry workers, who believed that Democrats were abandoning them as the national party has shifted to the left on energy policy and gun policy. The fossil fuel industry is especially important in Cascade County, and the growth of the county has come mainly from rural conservative voters moving to the area as opposed to more left-wing voters moving into other parts of Montana from Democratic-leaning states.

United States presidential election results for Cascade County, Montana
Year	Republican		Democratic		Third party(ies)	
Year	No.	%	No.	%	No.	%
1892	1,295	45.22%	1,184	41.34%	385	13.44%
1896	953	24.51%	2,920	75.10%	15	0.39%
1900	1,997	42.96%	2,564	55.16%	87	1.87%
1904	2,405	55.34%	1,385	31.87%	556	12.79%
1908	1,935	44.86%	1,888	43.77%	490	11.36%
1912	1,079	23.72%	1,633	35.90%	1,837	40.38%
1916	3,253	30.57%	6,612	62.14%	776	7.29%
1920	6,808	58.83%	3,938	34.03%	826	7.14%
1924	5,081	43.41%	2,220	18.96%	4,405	37.63%
1928	8,183	55.08%	6,540	44.02%	133	0.90%
1932	5,800	34.48%	10,047	59.72%	976	5.80%
1936	4,077	22.92%	13,325	74.91%	387	2.18%
1940	6,443	31.70%	13,637	67.10%	244	1.20%
1944	6,372	36.54%	10,924	62.65%	141	0.81%
1948	6,830	34.47%	12,082	60.97%	905	4.57%
1952	12,176	52.09%	11,051	47.28%	146	0.62%
1956	12,455	52.88%	11,098	47.12%	0	0.00%
1960	11,928	45.72%	14,117	54.11%	45	0.17%
1964	8,986	33.64%	17,609	65.92%	119	0.45%
1968	11,588	43.23%	13,507	50.39%	1,708	6.37%
1972	16,159	52.40%	12,899	41.83%	1,778	5.77%
1976	15,289	50.11%	14,678	48.11%	544	1.78%
1980	17,664	54.80%	11,105	34.45%	3,465	10.75%
1984	19,846	57.52%	14,252	41.30%	407	1.18%
1988	15,946	49.64%	15,718	48.93%	460	1.43%
1992	12,494	34.16%	14,719	40.24%	9,365	25.60%
1996	14,291	40.82%	15,707	44.87%	5,008	14.31%
2000	18,164	54.52%	13,137	39.43%	2,016	6.05%
2004	19,028	56.87%	13,701	40.95%	730	2.18%
2008	16,857	47.62%	17,664	49.90%	875	2.47%
2012	18,345	53.06%	15,232	44.05%	999	2.89%
2016	19,632	56.79%	12,175	35.22%	2,764	8.00%
2020	23,315	58.46%	15,456	38.75%	1,114	2.79%
2024	22,419	59.65%	14,021	37.31%	1,143	3.04%

== Economy ==
Malmstrom Air Force Base is a driving force in the regional economy. In 2009, Benefis, Great Falls Clinic, National Electronics Warranty and Walmart were the largest private employers.

== Education ==
The Apollos University, the University of Providence (formerly University of Great Falls), and the MSU College of Technology—Great Falls are all located in Great Falls.

=== K-12 education ===
Public school districts include:

Secondary:

- Belt High School District
- Cascade High School District
- Great Falls High School District
- Simms High School District
- Centerville High School District

Elementary:

- Belt Elementary School District
- Centerville Elementary School District
- Cascade Elementary School District
- Great Falls Elementary School District
- Sun River Valley Elementary School District
- Ulm Elementary School District
- Vaughn Elementary School District

There is also a state-operated school, Montana School for the Deaf & Blind.

== Communities ==
=== City ===
- Great Falls (county seat)

=== Towns ===
- Belt
- Cascade
- Neihart

=== Census-designated places ===
- Big Stone Colony
- Black Eagle
- Cascade Colony
- Centerville
- Fair Haven Colony
- Fort Shaw
- Gibson Flats
- Hardy
- Malmstrom AFB
- Monarch
- Pleasant Valley Colony
- Riceville
- Sand Coulee
- Simms
- Stockett
- Sun Prairie
- Sun River
- Tracy
- Ulm
- Vaughn

=== Unincorporated communities ===
- Adel
- Armington
- Armington Junction
- Ashuelot
- Dearborn (partially within Lewis & Clark County)
- Eden
- Emerson Junction
- Gordon
- Millegan
- Number Seven
- Salem
- Sheffels
- Portage

== In popular culture ==
Several motion pictures have been filmed in Great Falls. Many have filmed in Cascade County and Great Falls, and a few in Cascade County (outside the Great Falls city limits). Those films shot in the county and outside Great Falls city limits include:

- Thunderbolt and Lightfoot (1974) (Note: Shot in Cascade County and in the city of Great Falls, the film's finale was filmed on Interstate 15 about 15 miles (24 km) north of Craig.)
- The Stone Boy (1984)
- The Untouchables (1987) (Note: The U.S.-Canada border crossing scene was filmed at Hardy Bridge.)
- Holy Matrimony (1994)
- The Slaughter Rule (2002)
- Northfork (2003) (Note: Filming occurred at various places around Great Falls, including Giant Springs State Park on the immediate outskirts of the city.)
- Iron Ridge (2008) (Note: A cabin near Monarch, Montana, was used in one critical filming location.)
- Wildlife (2018)

== See also ==
- List of lakes in Cascade County, Montana
- List of mountains in Cascade County, Montana
- National Register of Historic Places listings in Cascade County, Montana

== Bibliography ==
- Barth, Jack (1991). Roadside Hollywood: The Movie Lover's State-By-State Guide to Film Locations, Celebrity Hangouts, Celluloid Tourist Attractions, and More. Chicago: Contemporary Books. ISBN 9780809243266.
