= Pleasant Valley Colony, Montana =

- Census-designated place
- Location within Montana Location within the United States
- Coordinates: 47°20′16″N 111°02′41″W
- Country: United States
- State: Montana
- County: Cascade

Area
  - Total: 0.25 sq mi (0.65 km^{2})
  - Land: 0.25 sq mi (0.65 km^{2})
  - Water: 0 sq mi (0.00 km^{2})
- Elevation: 4,180 ft (1,270 m)

Population (2020)
  - Total: 130
  - Density: 521.9/sq mi (201.52/km^{2})
- Time zone: UTC-7 (Mountain (MST))
  - Summer (DST): UTC-6 (MDT)
- ZIP Code: 59412 (Belt)
- Area code: 406
- FIPS code: 30-58310
- GNIS feature ID: 2804697

Pleasant Valley Colony is a Hutterite community and census-designated place (CDP) in Cascade County, Montana, United States. As of the 2020 census, Pleasant Valley Colony had a population of 130. It is in the eastern part of the county, 11 miles (18 km) southwest of Belt and 19 miles (31 km) southeast of Great Falls.

It was first listed as a CDP prior to the 2020 census.

== Demographics ==
Historical population
| Census | Pop. | Note | %± |
|---|---|---|---|
| 2020 | 130 | | — |
U.S. Decennial Census
