= Tracy, Montana =

- Census-designated place
- Location within Montana Location within the United States
- Coordinates: 47°24′12″N 111°09′17″W
- Country: United States
- State: Montana
- County: Cascade

Area
  - Total: 0.37 sq mi (0.96 km^{2})
  - Land: 0.37 sq mi (0.96 km^{2})
  - Water: 0 sq mi (0.00 km^{2})
- Elevation: 3,435 ft (1,047 m)

Population (2020)
  - Total: 196
  - Density: 529/sq mi (204.2/km^{2})
- Time zone: UTC-7 (Mountain (MST))
  - Summer (DST): UTC-6 (MDT)
- ZIP Code: 59472 (Sand Coulee)
- Area code: 406
- FIPS code: 30-74650
- GNIS feature ID: 2804700

Tracy is an unincorporated community and census-designated place (CDP) in Cascade County, Montana, United States. It is in the east-central part of the county, in the valley of Sand Coulee Creek, a north-flowing tributary of the Missouri River. Tracy is bordered to the west by the community of Sand Coulee, and it is 12 miles (19 km) southeast of Great Falls.

Tracy was first listed as a CDP prior to the 2020 census. As of the 2020 census, Tracy had a population of 196.

== Demographics ==
Historical population
Census	Pop.	Note	%±
2020	196		—
U.S. Decennial Census
