= List of United States metropolitan areas by GDP =

US GDP by CBSA in 2024

This is a list of the United States metropolitan areas by their gross domestic product (GDP).

Nominal GDP for the top 50 metropolitan statistical areas in millions of dollars

As the Bureau of Economic Analysis (BEA) no longer publishes GDP estimates at the metropolitan statistical area level, 2024 figures are derived from aggregated county-level data.

2024 rank	Metropolitan area	State(s)	2024	2023	2022	2021	2020	2019	2018	2017	2016	2015	2014	2013	2012	Population (2020)
1	New York-Newark-Jersey City, NY-NJ-PA (Metropolitan Statistical Area)	NY, NJ, PA	2,442,500	2,300,518	2,180,735	2,029,909	1,867,554	1,884,333	1,772,319	1,698,122	1,634,671	1,577,366	1,511,763	1,439,043	1,401,233	20,081,935
2	Los Angeles-Long Beach-Anaheim, CA (Metropolitan Statistical Area)	CA	1,354,718	1,289,320	1,224,694	1,134,862	1,034,824	1,065,710	1,047,661	995,114	945,600	912,384	858,170	820,353	788,081	13,200,998
3	Chicago-Naperville-Elgin, IL-IN-WI (Metropolitan Statistical Area)	IL, IN, WI	923,120	885,790	831,790	762,403	692,186	721,100	689,464	659,855	641,589	627,033	599,805	577,948	561,016	9,449,351
4	San Francisco-Oakland-Berkeley, CA (Metropolitan Statistical Area)	CA	801,311	760,416	717,311	700,496	615,329	610,192	548,613	509,382	469,472	446,344	413,519	383,254	364,594	4,749,008
5	Dallas-Fort Worth-Arlington, TX (Metropolitan Statistical Area)	TX	800,601	759,001	697,285	615,661	548,588	545,968	512,509	482,218	458,973	442,879	420,929	394,178	375,065	7,637,387
6	Houston-The Woodlands-Sugar Land, TX (Metropolitan Statistical Area)	TX	757,751	721,005	662,444	573,041	497,264	507,655	478,778	447,521	430,444	446,486	430,726	423,766	404,431	7,149,642
7	Washington-Arlington-Alexandria, DC-VA-MD-WV (Metropolitan Statistical Area)	DC, MD, VA, WV	749,108	708,164	655,650	613,360	568,617	567,641	540,684	515,553	500,084	481,861	460,254	448,268	442,224	6,278,542
8	Boston-Cambridge-Newton, MA-NH (Metropolitan Statistical Area)	MA, NH	644,814	610,626	576,631	538,437	489,388	484,475	463,570	439,144	421,783	406,675	381,353	365,670	357,087	4,941,632
9	Atlanta-Sandy Springs-Roswell, GA (Metropolitan Statistical Area)	GA	604,282	573,424	539,532	484,532	438,305	447,126	397,261	385,542	369,806	347,604	326,502	307,750	291,481	6,104,803
10	Seattle-Tacoma-Bellevue, WA (Metropolitan Statistical Area)	WA	604,065	562,747	516,139	479,975	436,305	429,485	392,036	356,572	334,411	317,153	296,028	280,291	267,472	4,018,762
11	Philadelphia-Camden-Wilmington, PA-NJ-DE-MD (Metropolitan Statistical Area)	DE, MD, NJ, PA	582,086	554,487	526,066	481,851	446,219	454,634	444,148	422,539	416,110	406,605	388,621	374,787	364,052	6,245,051
12	Miami-Fort Lauderdale-West Palm Beach, FL (Metropolitan Statistical Area)	FL	574,994	542,868	494,123	435,343	378,469	384,758	354,740	344,882	330,784	315,624	292,308	268,198	266,563	6,138,333
13	San Jose-Sunnyvale-Santa Clara, CA (Metropolitan Statistical Area)	CA	441,768	407,468	386,975	388,600	343,544	320,957	331,020	275,293	253,900	237,832	210,690	193,716	180,996	2,000,468
14	Phoenix-Mesa-Scottsdale, AZ (Metropolitan Statistical Area)	AZ	435,522	403,810	371,982	330,293	293,191	281,155	255,211	242,951	231,011	221,570	209,596	199,871	195,630	4,845,832
15	Minneapolis-St. Paul-Bloomington, MN-WI (Metropolitan Statistical Area)	MN, WI	369,266	350,511	330,383	301,095	275,616	281,152	263,690	260,106	250,376	242,053	232,416	220,938	213,855	3,690,261
16	Detroit-Warren-Dearborn, MI (Metropolitan Statistical Area)	MI	348,039	335,684	307,629	281,477	262,194	271,677	267,731	260,612	250,430	242,296	229,348	220,277	215,614	4,392,041
17	San Diego-Carlsbad, CA (Metropolitan Statistical Area)	CA	331,868	315,273	295,367	272,919	247,088	245,745	245,138	231,845	222,963	211,807	204,915	198,312	189,074	3,298,634
18	Denver-Aurora-Lakewood, CO (Metropolitan Statistical Area)	CO	330,181	315,295	291,497	260,076	234,330	231,278	214,157	208,868	197,068	192,499	186,345	173,016	167,491	2,963,821
19	Charlotte-Concord-Gastonia, NC-SC (Metropolitan Statistical Area)	NC, SC	277,107	259,147	234,676	209,790	190,052	185,907	169,862	162,103	154,070	148,276	143,367	136,399	131,934	2,660,329
20	Baltimore-Columbia-Towson, MD (Metropolitan Statistical Area)	MD	275,427	258,686	242,624	225,243	207,454	210,147	205,313	192,178	186,856	178,895	173,073	167,270	162,776	2,844,510
21	Riverside-San Bernardino-Ontario, CA (Metropolitan Statistical Area)	CA	272,670	256,913	240,936	219,852	197,378	194,181	187,109	177,061	168,176	160,810	149,011	140,326	132,596	4,599,839
22	Austin-Round Rock, TX (Metropolitan Statistical Area)	TX	268,445	251,905	229,423	197,665	172,729	164,734	146,784	136,546	128,470	122,091	119,572	111,720	103,513	2,283,371
23	Tampa-St. Petersburg-Clearwater, FL (Metropolitan Statistical Area)	FL	261,610	246,112	223,532	198,221	176,357	170,683	159,002	150,163	144,247	135,569	127,963	125,706	117,711	3,175,275
24	St. Louis, MO-IL (Metropolitan Statistical Area)	MO, IL	236,782	226,719	211,021	193,358	175,616	176,456	169,839	161,281	157,716	155,377	150,667	146,336	142,184	2,820,253
25	Orlando-Kissimmee-Sanford, FL (Metropolitan Statistical Area)	FL	233,182	218,762	197,923	172,889	149,533	153,318	138,947	132,448	128,000	123,054	115,309	115,249	103,535	2,673,376
26	Portland-Vancouver-Hillsboro, OR-WA (Metropolitan Statistical Area)	OR, WA	225,338	215,714	204,748	190,185	172,858	172,642	164,419	154,635	146,475	129,035	122,435	119,281	115,405	2,512,859
27	Nashville-Davidson—Murfreesboro—Franklin, TN (Metropolitan Statistical Area)	TN	223,009	204,861	187,781	163,031			132,202	124,550	119,995	114,142	107,932	101,188	96,274	2,014,444
28	Cincinnati, OH-KY-IN (Metropolitan Statistical Area)	IN, KY, OH	210,417	198,889	186,141	171,737			141,042	137,034	132,588	127,587	123,356	120,413	115,420	2,249,797
29	Indianapolis-Carmel-Anderson, IN (Metropolitan Statistical Area)	IN	209,843	199,198	184,394	162,062			140,762	134,498	129,635	124,990	123,881	117,180	111,780	2,089,653
30	Pittsburgh, PA (Metropolitan Statistical Area)	PA	205,941	194,230	181,485	168,021			152,840	147,367	137,944	136,684	133,691	126,824	122,439	2,457,000
31	Sacramento—Roseville—Arden-Arcade, CA (Metropolitan Statistical Area)	CA	201,905	189,624	176,276	160,542			145,479	137,549	130,278	125,420	116,598	107,463	101,242	2,397,382
32	San Antonio-New Braunfels, TX (Metropolitan Statistical Area)	TX	198,422	182,139	163,061	144,384			133,633	124,813	121,016	115,020	110,313	101,348	93,330	2,558,143
33	Las Vegas-Henderson-Paradise, NV (Metropolitan Statistical Area)	NV	195,936	178,388	160,728	136,198			122,423	112,288	107,452	103,734	93,742	90,426	87,098	2,265,461
34	Columbus, OH (Metropolitan Statistical Area)	OH	193,518	182,087	169,123	154,509			129,328	124,070	119,368	115,954	110,636	106,268	104,000	2,138,926
35	Kansas City, MO-KS (Metropolitan Statistical Area)	KS, MO	188,210	185,746	169,501	154,328			132,703	127,540	123,702	121,591	116,163	111,207	107,028	2,192,035
36	Cleveland-Elyria, OH (Metropolitan Statistical Area)	OH	187,596	173,134	162,788	147,637			134,369	128,662	125,178	123,856	118,335	114,671	106,751	2,185,825
37	Salt Lake City, UT (Metropolitan Statistical Area)	UT	157,095	147,519	135,409	118,494			94,306	88,801	84,110	80,644	75,214	71,636	70,114	1,257,936
38	Raleigh, NC (Metropolitan Statistical Area)	NC	142,885	133,081	119,675	108,288			83,665	77,603	74,344	70,553	65,232	60,534	57,615	1,413,982
39	Jacksonville, FL (Metropolitan Statistical Area)	FL	139,151	129,095	117,162	101,367			83,186	79,650	75,727	71,810	67,001	65,166	61,519	1,605,848
40	Milwaukee-Waukesha-West Allis, WI (Metropolitan Statistical Area)	WI	137,110	130,857	120,563	111,480			91,170	89,083	89,083	88,972	88,533	87,567	87,394	1,574,731
41	Virginia Beach-Norfolk-Newport News, VA-NC (Metropolitan Statistical Area)	NC, VA	134,290	127,459	118,686	107,067			100,976	96,855	94,321	93,725	89,088	86,414	85,485	1,780,059
42	Richmond, VA (Metropolitan Statistical Area)	VA	123,878	116,960	109,513	99,388			85,792	82,739	79,508	76,875	72,157	69,831	67,572	1,314,434
43	Providence-Warwick, RI-MA (Metropolitan Statistical Area)	MA, RI	116,422	111,840	105,571	96,913			87,414	83,929	80,257	78,520	74,614	72,338	71,042	1,676,579
44	Hartford-East Hartford-Middletown, CT (Metropolitan Statistical Area)	CT	110,914													1,150,473
45	Memphis, TN-MS-AR (Metropolitan Statistical Area)	AR, MS, TN	108,436	102,934	96,182	86,493			76,749	73,289	71,088	69,318	66,910	65,875	65,186	1,345,425
46	Louisville/Jefferson County, KY-IN (Metropolitan Statistical Area)	IN, KY	107,855	97,751	90,836	82,866			72,093	69,353	67,272	64,946	60,316	55,910	54,813	1,362,180
47	Oklahoma City, OK (Metropolitan Statistical Area)	OK	103,017	100,054	94,742	86,662			81,016	74,884	70,828	72,253	69,406	67,693	63,356	1,425,695
48	Omaha,NE-IA MSA (Metropolitan Statistical Area)	IA, NE	99,162	92,356	84,673	76,991			68,323	65,867	65,087	63,233	60,770	58,032		967,604
49	Buffalo–Niagara Falls (Metropolitan Statistical Area)	NY	94,702													1,166,902
50	Birmingham, AL (Metropolitan Statistical Area)	AL	92,429													1,180,631

== See also ==
- List of U.S. metropolitan areas by GDP per capita
- List of U.S. states by economic growth rate
