= Montana School for the Deaf & Blind =

Boarding school in Montana, United States

Coordinates: 47.506°N 111.239°W

Montana School for the Deaf & Blind (MSDB) is a boarding K–12 school in Great Falls, Montana, for deaf and blind students.

The school takes full-time students and students who split time between regular school district schools and MSDB.

The dormitories are intended for students living outside of the Great Falls area.

== History ==
In the late 2010s the school had difficulties finding qualified staff. Then the school offered to return $250,000, or 4% of its budget, to the state, but the lawmakers told the school to keep the money. Members of the state Republican Party had a positive reception to the move. In 2019 Bradley Hamlett (D-Cascade), of the Montana House of Representatives, stated that the state should offer more assistance to the school. The Lions Club of Montana held a fundraiser to buy the school prodigi devices, raising $300,000. The Prodigi Connect 12 devices were used for blind students, replacing closed-circuit television and lower quality magnifiers, and therefore facilitated real-time study. In 2018 the club also repaired the playground.
