= Sun River, Montana =

- CDP
- Location of Sun River, Montana
- Coordinates: 47°31′32″N 111°44′44″W
- Country: United States
- State: Montana
- County: Cascade

Area
  - Total: 1.86 sq mi (4.82 km^{2})
  - Land: 1.86 sq mi (4.82 km^{2})
  - Water: 0 sq mi (0.00 km^{2})
- Elevation: 3,416 ft (1,041 m)

Population (2020)
  - Total: 95
  - Density: 51.0/sq mi (19.71/km^{2})
- Time zone: UTC−7 (Mountain (MST))
  - Summer (DST): UTC−6 (MDT)
- ZIP code: 59483
- Area code: 406
- FIPS code: 30-72475
- GNIS feature ID: 2410027

Sun River is a census-designated place (CDP) in Cascade County, Montana, United States. As of the 2020 census, Sun River had a population of 95. It is part of the Great Falls, Montana Metropolitan Statistical Area.

== History ==
The town is named after the Sun River, by which it is located. The name was from the Indian word Nataeosueti, translated by the English as "Medicine" or "Sun" river. Artifacts have been found in the area related to native cultures dating back to 2000 B.C. More recent Native tribes include Blackfeet and Crow.

The town was established in 1867 by John Largent, who laid out the town, sold lots, and opened a store and post office. Largent and Joe Healy also built a toll bridge across the Sun River to profit from the Mullan Road traffic between Fort Benton and the new gold mines to the south. By 1876 the town had become an important location for livestock production.

== Geography ==
Sun River is located at the intersection of U.S. Route 89 and Montana Highway 200. It is about 23 miles from Great Falls.

According to the United States Census Bureau, the CDP has a total area of 1.8 square miles (4.7 km^{2}), all land.

== Demographics ==
Historical population
Census	Pop.	Note	%±
2020	95		—
U.S. Decennial Census

As of the census of 2000, there were 500 people, 230 households, and 58 families residing in the CDP. The population density was 98.8 inhabitants per square mile (38.1/km^{2}). There were 65 housing units at an average density of 35.8 per square mile (13.8/km^{2}). The racial makeup of the CDP was 96.95% White, 2.29% Native American, and 0.76% from two or more races.

There were 58 households, out of which 27.6% had children under the age of 18 living with them, 53.4% were married couples living together, 5.2% had a female householder with no husband present, and 36.2% were non-families. 31.0% of all households were made up of individuals, and 8.6% had someone living alone who was 65 years of age or older. The average household size was 2.26 and the average family size was 2.84.

In the CDP, the population was spread out, with 26.0% under the age of 18, 5.3% from 18 to 24, 23.7% from 25 to 44, 27.5% from 45 to 64, and 17.6% who were 65 years of age or older. The median age was 39 years. For every 100 females, there were 92.6 males. For every 100 females age 18 and over, there were 94.0 males.

The median income for a household in the CDP was $25,357, and the median income for a family was $28,750. Males had a median income of $24,583 versus $19,531 for females. The per capita income for the CDP was $14,647. There were 13.5% of families and 10.2% of the population living below the poverty line, including 14.7% of under eighteens and 14.3% of those over 64.

== Climate ==
Like most of Montana outside of the highest mountains, Sun River has a cold semi-arid climate (Köppen BSk) characterised by hot summers with chilly nights, and cold winters with very high temperature variability due to warming by chinook winds contrasting with occasional severe chilling by polar air from Canada.

During winter, maximum temperatures exceed 50 °F or 10 °C on an average of 18.4 days between December and February, and a total of 26.7 days in November and March. During cold outbreaks minima fall below 0 °F or −17.8 °C on 25.5 nights in an average winter, though only seven such nights occurred during the very mild winter of 1999–2000 but as many as fifty-two in the cold winter of 1968–69. In the summer temperature exceed 90 °F or 32.2 °C on 14.2 days, although 100 °F or 37.8 °C is exceeded merely once in five summers on average.

Most precipitation comes from thunderstorms in late spring and summer, but even then it is less heavy than further into the Plains. The wettest recorded month has been May 1953 with 6.74 inches or 171.2 millimetres, whilst in September 2012 not even a “trace” was reported. Snowfall is moderate due to the dry winters, with a mean of 39.2 inches or 1.00 metre and a median of 29.4 inches or 0.75 metres. The most snow in a month has been 28.8 inches or 0.73 metres in April 1967, whilst the most snow on the ground has been 19 inches or 0.48 metres on 17 February 1959 following a storm depositing 13.9 inches (0.35 m) over the previous two days.

Climate data for Sun River 4 S, Montana (1971-2000; extremes 1912-)
Month	Jan	Feb	Mar	Apr	May	Jun	Jul	Aug	Sep	Oct	Nov	Dec	Year
Record high °F (°C)	66 (19)	73 (23)	78 (26)	88 (31)	93 (34)	99 (37)	111 (44)	102 (39)	97 (36)	91 (33)	74 (23)	65 (18)	111 (44)
Mean daily maximum °F (°C)	34.3 (1.3)	40.0 (4.4)	47.4 (8.6)	57.3 (14.1)	66.0 (18.9)	74.0 (23.3)	81.5 (27.5)	80.8 (27.1)	70.3 (21.3)	59.5 (15.3)	43.4 (6.3)	35.8 (2.1)	57.5 (14.2)
Mean daily minimum °F (°C)	11.9 (−11.2)	16.2 (−8.8)	22.2 (−5.4)	30.4 (−0.9)	38.7 (3.7)	46.3 (7.9)	49.8 (9.9)	48.8 (9.3)	40.4 (4.7)	33.0 (0.6)	22.8 (−5.1)	14.7 (−9.6)	31.3 (−0.4)
Record low °F (°C)	−46 (−43)	−45 (−43)	−33 (−36)	−16 (−27)	8 (−13)	26 (−3)	33 (1)	28 (−2)	16 (−9)	−19 (−28)	−40 (−40)	−51 (−46)	−51 (−46)
Average precipitation inches (mm)	0.42 (11)	0.36 (9.1)	0.67 (17)	1.24 (31)	2.18 (55)	2.08 (53)	1.47 (37)	1.51 (38)	1.06 (27)	0.81 (21)	0.49 (12)	0.42 (11)	12.71 (322.1)
Average snowfall inches (cm)	7.0 (18)	4.6 (12)	6.9 (18)	4.2 (11)	0.8 (2.0)	0.0 (0.0)	0.0 (0.0)	0.1 (0.25)	0.3 (0.76)	2.7 (6.9)	4.3 (11)	8.3 (21)	39.2 (100.91)
Average precipitation days (≥ 0.01 in)	5.6	4.6	6.5	7.6	10.2	9.2	7.1	7.8	6.6	5.1	5.0	5.0	80.3
Average snowy days (≥ 0.1 in)	4.9	3.8	3.3	2.0	0.2	0.0	0.0	0.02	0.2	0.9	3.1	3.8	22.2
Source 1: NOAA
Source 2: NWS (January and July record highs)

== Education ==
The area attends Sun River Valley School District. This includes Fort Shaw Elementary School and the combined Sun River Middle School and Simms High School.
