= 2007 CBA All-Star Game =

American Conference	National Conference
134 (OT)	131
- Date: February 6, 2007
- Venue: Butte Civic Center, Butte
- MVP: Ralph Holmes
- Attendance: 3,283

The 2007 Continental Basketball Association All-Star Game was the 41st All-Star Game organised by CBA since its inception in 1949. It was held at the Butte Civic Center in Sioux Falls, South Dakota on February 6, 2007, in front of 3,283 fans. The National Conference defeated the American Conference 134–131 in overtime.

Ralph Holmes was named the MVP.

It was the 23rd Annual CBA All-Star Classic, under the name of CBA (since 1978). The 2007 CBA All-Star Classic night started with the Slam Dunk Contest and was followed by the Long Distance Shoot-out.

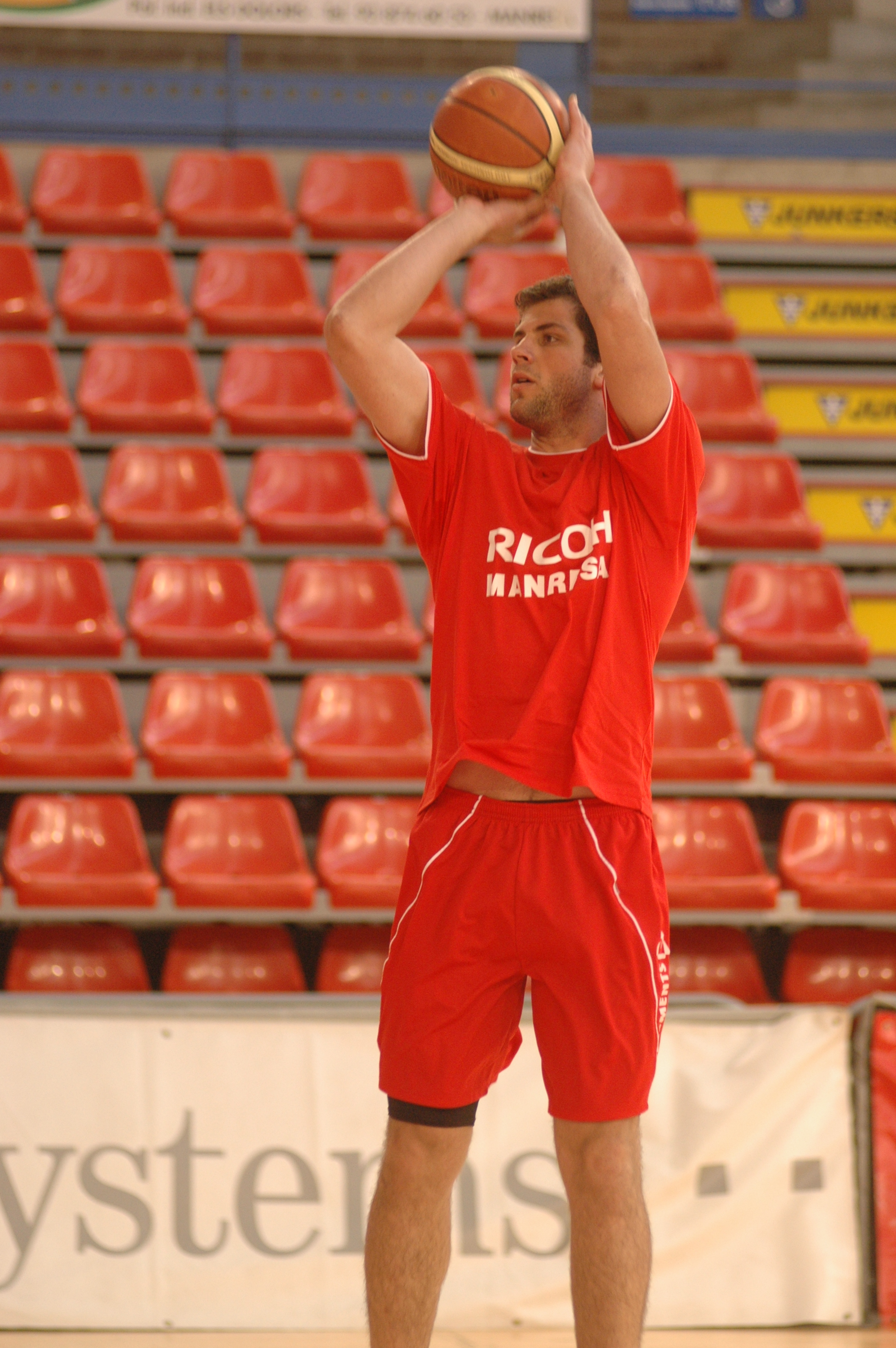
Nick Vander Laan was selected for the National Conference

== The 2007 CBA All-Star Game events ==
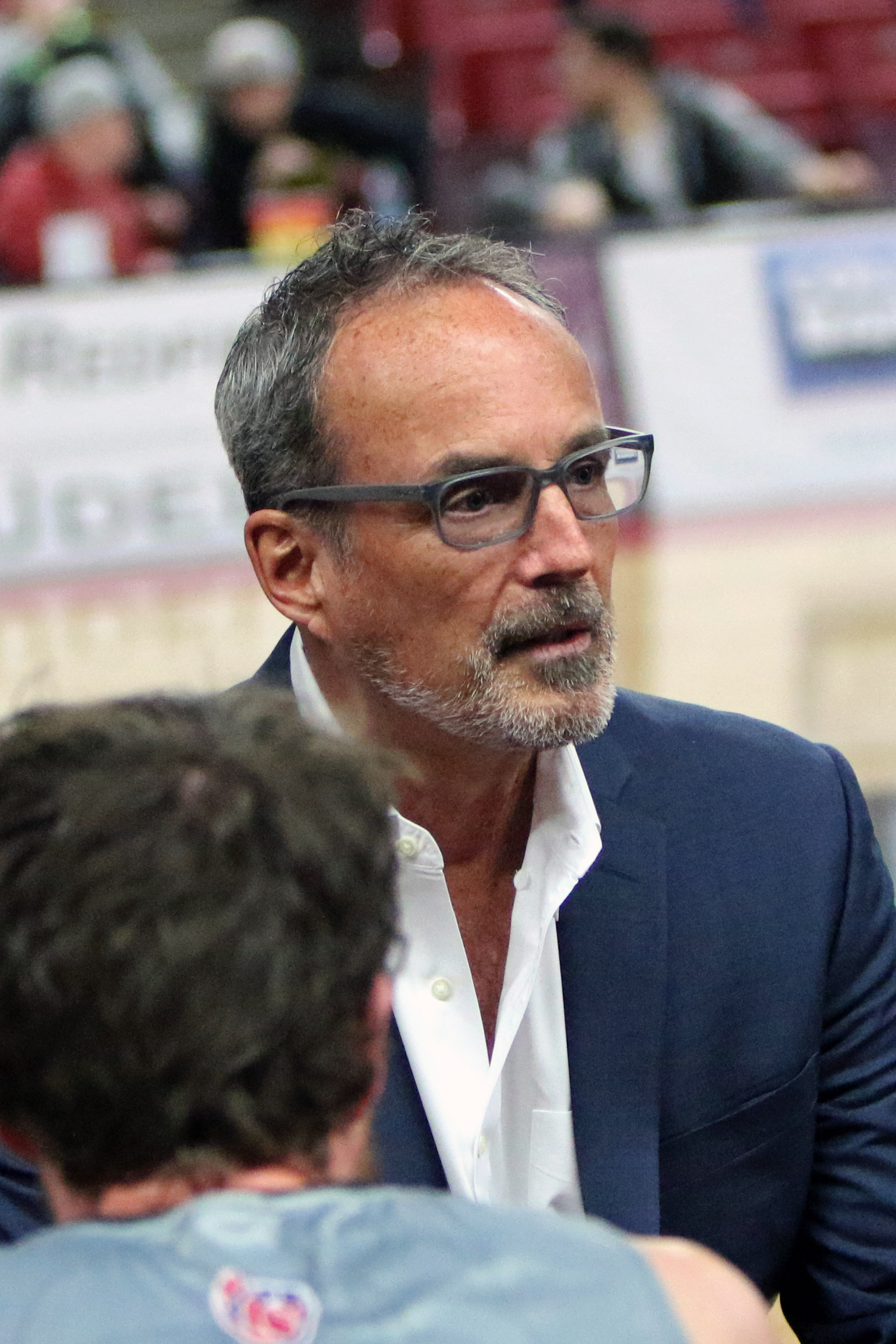
Paul Woolpert coached the National All-Stars

=== CBA Long Distance Shootout ===
David Bell of Butte Daredevils was the winner. He won over Desmond Ferguson from the Minot Skyrockets and Jamario Moon from Albany Patroons.

=== Slam-dunk contest ===
Anthony Richardson of the Butte Daredevils won the slam-dunk competition over Carl Edwards of the Indiana Alley Cats.

=== The Game ===
Erick Barkley was the top scorer with 25 pts for the American Conference, while Ralph Holmes was the topscorer for the Nationals with 25 pts and 13 rebounds.

Erick Barkley was the one who sent the game to overtime with a three pointer with 3.4 seconds and scored 6 out of his 25 in the over time. However, he missed a half-court shot at the end to send the game into a second over time.

Jamario Moon scored 17 points, and had 5 steals, 2 blocks and 10 rebounds before a sprained ankle early in the 3d quarter that sent him to the bench. J.J. Sullinger scored 22 points, while T.J. Thompson had 18. Ray Cunningham scored 14 points for the American Conference. John Millsap scored 19 pts and Nick Vander Laan was the game's top rebounder with 16.

== All-Star teams ==
=== Rosters ===
National Conference
Pos.	Player	Team	Appearance
Team
C	(United States) Chris Alexander	Yakima Sun Kings	2006
F	(United States) Odell Bradley	Butte Daredevils	
F	(United States) Rob Griffin	Yakima Sun Kings	
G	(United States) Ralphy Holmes	Yakima Sun Kings	
F	(United States) Jamar Howard	Great Falls Explorers	
F	(United States) John Millsap	Utah Eagles	
G	(United States) Malik Moore	Great Falls Explorers	
C	(United States) Nick Vander Laan	Butte Daredevils	
F	(United States) Rocky Walls	Yakima Sun Kings	
F	(United States) Galen Young	Yakima Sun Kings	2004
Head coach: (United States) Paul Woolpert (Yakima Sun Kings)

American Conference
Pos.	Player	Team	Appearance
Team
G	(United States) Erick Barkley	Indiana Alley Cats	
F	(United States) Ray Cunningham	Minot Skyrockets	
F	(United States) Carl Edwards	Indiana Alley Cats	
F	(United States) Desmond Ferguson	Minot Skyrockets	
G	(United States) Shaun Fountain	Indiana Alley Cats	
G	(United States) J.J. Sullinger	Indiana Alley Cats	
F	(United States) Jamario Moon	Albany Patroons	
C	(United States) Kevin Pittsnogle*	Pittsburgh Xplosion	
F	(United States) T.J. Thompson	Albany Patroons	
F	(United States) Eric Williams	Albany Patroons	
Head coach: (United States) Micheal Ray Richardson (Albany Patroons)

- Kevin Pittsnogle did not play due to an injury.

=== Result ===
Team 1	Score	Team 2
American Conference	134 - 131 (OT)	National Conference

== Awards ==
MVP	Topscorer	Slam-dunk champion	Long Distance Shootout Winner
(United States) Ralph Holmes	(United States) Erick Barkley (United States) Ralph Holmes	(United States) Anthony Richardson	(United States) David Bell

== See also ==
- 2006 CBA All-Star Game
- Continental Basketball Association
