= 2008 CBA All-Star Game =

American Conference	National Conference
107	109
- Date: January 23, 2008
- Venue: Yakima SunDome, Yakima
- MVP: Odell Bradley
- Attendance: 4,000

The 2008 Continental Basketball Association All-Star Game was the 42nd All-Star Game and final event organised by CBA since its inception in 1949. It was held at the Yakima SunDome in Yakima, Washington on January 23 in front of 4,000 fans. The National Conference defeated the American Conference 134-131 in overtime.

Odell Bradley was named the MVP.

It was the 24th and last Annual CBA All-Star Classic, under the name of CBA (since 1978).

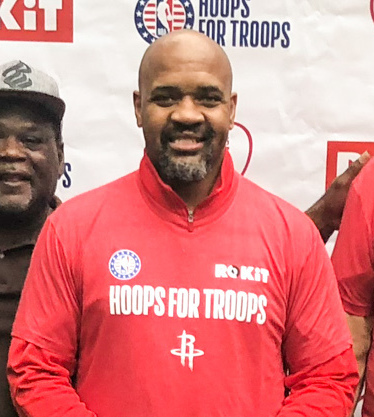
Moochie Norris was selected for the National Conference

== The 2008 CBA All-Star Game events ==
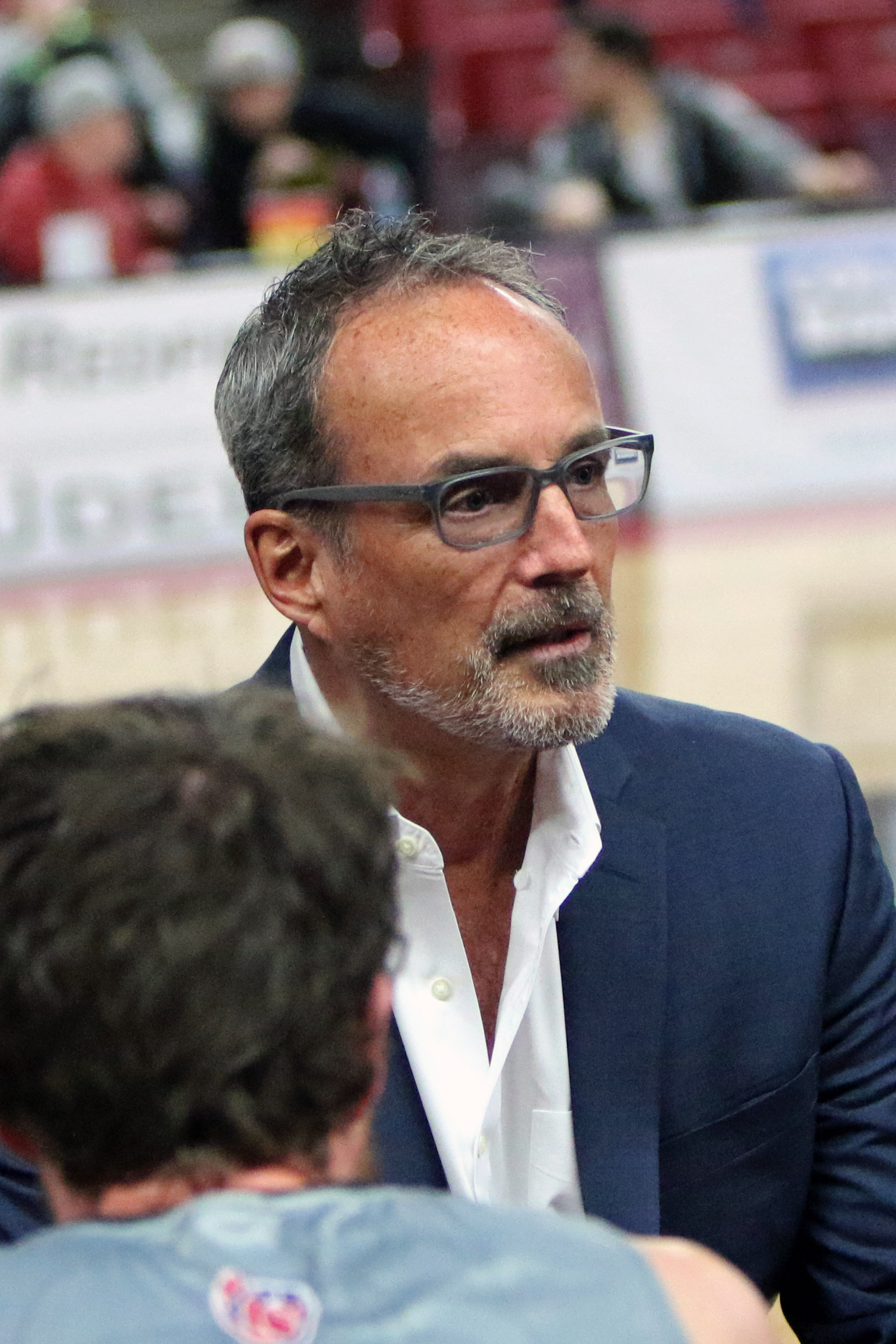
Paul Woolpert coached the National All-Stars

=== CBA Long Distance Shootout ===
Desmond Ferguson of Yakima Sun Kings was the winner. He beat Aaron Cook of Butte Daredevils in the final.

=== Slam-dunk contest ===
Harvey Thomas of the Yakima Sun Kings won the slam-dunk competition. He beat Marvin Phillips of Oklahoma Cavalry in the final.

It was the fourth consecutive All-Star Game in which a player from the host city’s club won both the Slam-Dunk and Long Distance Shoot-out.

=== The Game ===
Odell Bradley was the top scorer with 22 pts off the bench for the National Conference, while Desmond Ferguson added 20 pts. Josh Pace had 19 pts for the Americans.

Marvin Phillips was the leading rebounder with 14.

Four Yakama Sun Kings players were in the starting lineup of the National All-Stars. With this win for the Nationals, Paul Woolpert tied Eric Musselman for most CBA All-Star wins (four).

== All-Star teams ==
=== Rosters ===
National Conference
Pos.	Player	Team	Points	Appearance
Starters
F	(United States) Jason Sasser	Yakima Sun Kings	11 pts	
G	(United States) Tim Ellis	Yakima Sun Kings	9 pts	
G	(United States) Jermaine Blackburn	Yakima Sun Kings	4 pts	
F	(United States) Desmond Ferguson	Yakima Sun Kings	20 pts	2007
F	(United States) Nate Green	Great Falls Explorers	14 pts	
Reserves
F	(United States) Odell Bradley	Butte Daredevils	22 pts	2007
F	(United States) Daryan Selvy	Oklahoma Cavalry	12 pts	
F	(United States) Demorris Smith	Rio Grande Valley Silverados	4 pts	
F	(United States) Marvin Phillips	Oklahoma Cavalry	5 pts	
F	(United States) Aaron Cook	Butte Daredevils	8 pts	
Unavailable
G	(United States) Moochie Norris	Yakima Sun Kings		
Head coach: (United States) Paul Woolpert (Yakima Sun Kings)

American Conference
Pos.	Player	Team	Points	Appearance
Team
G	(United States) Josh Pace	East Kentucky Miners	19 pts	
G	(United States) Moses Marbury	Atlanta Krunk	16 pts	
G	(United States) James Jackson	East Kentucky Miners	8 pts	
G	(United States) Nat Burton	Albany Patroons	11 pts	
F	(United States) Sidney Holmes	Minot SkyRockets	6 pts	
F	(United States) Marshall Phillips	Minot SkyRockets	5 pts	
G	(United States) Mike Dean	East Kentucky Miners	6 pts	
F	(United States) John DeGroat	Pittsburgh Xplosion	13 pts	
C	(United States) John Strickland	Pittsburgh Xplosion	15 pts	
F	(United States) Steve Thomas	Atlanta Krunk	8 pts	
Unavailable
G	(United States) Shaun Fountain	Pittsburgh Xplosion		2007
G	(United States) Ronnie Fields	Minot SkyRockets		2003, 2004, 2006
F	(United States) Amal McCaskill	Albany Patroons		
Head coach: (United States) Chris Daleo (Minot SkyRockets)

=== Result ===
Team 1	Score	Team 2
National Conference	109 - 107	American Conference

== Awards ==
MVP	Topscorer	Slam-dunk champion	Long Distance Shootout Winner
(United States) Odell Bradley	(United States) Odell Bradley	(United States) Harvey Thomas	(United States) Desmond Ferguson

== See also ==
- 2007 CBA All-Star Game
- Continental Basketball Association
