= John Mazur (ice hockey) =

Canadian ice hockey player

- Born: June 1, 1954 (age 72) Winnipeg, Manitoba, Canada
- Height: 5 ft 10 in (178 cm)
- Weight: 175 lb (79 kg; 12 st 7 lb)
- Position: Left wing
- Shot: Left
- Played for: WHA; Houston Aeros; SWHL; El Paso Raiders; SHL; Winston-Salem Polar Twins; Baltimore Clippers
- NHL draft: Undrafted
- Playing career: 1975–1978

John Mazur (born June 1, 1954) is a Canadian former professional ice hockey player.

== Career ==
During the 1977–78 season Mazur played one game in the World Hockey Association (WHA) with the Houston Aeros.

== Career statistics ==
=== Regular season and playoffs ===
			Regular season					Playoffs
Season	Team	League	GP	G	A	Pts	PIM	GP	G	A	Pts	PIM
1973–74	St. Boniface Saints	MJHL	44	32	38	70	128	—	—	—	—	—
1973–74	Flin Flon Bombers	WCHL	2	0	0	0	0	—	—	—	—	—
1974–75	St. Boniface Saints	MJHL	33	13	16	29	70	—	—	—	—	—
1975–76	El Paso/Minot Raiders	SWHL	67	40	56	96	0	—	—	—	—	—
1976–77	Trail Smoke Eaters	WIHL	––	8	7	15	40	—	—	—	—	—
1976–77	Winston–Salem Polar Twins	SHL	2	0	0	0	0	—	—	—	—	—
1976–77	Baltimore Clippers	SHL	2	0	1	1	0	—	—	—	—	—
1977–78	Houston Aeros	WHA	1	0	0	0	0	—	—	—	—	—
1977–78	St. Boniface Mohawks	CSHL	––	2	5	7	21	—	—	—	—	—
1978–79	St. Boniface Mohawks	CSHL	Statistics Unavailable
WHA totals			1	0	0	0	0	—	—	—	—	—
