= Gerry Bell =

Gerry Bell may refer to:

- Gerry Bell (weather forecaster), see 2012 Atlantic hurricane season
- Gerry Bell (ice hockey), played in Amarillo Wranglers (1975–77)

== See also ==
- Jerry Bell (disambiguation)
- Jeremy Bell (disambiguation)
- Gerard Bell, actor, see Bryony Lavery
- Gerald Bell (disambiguation)
- Jerome Bell, singer
