= Amarillo Wranglers =

Amarillo Wranglers may refer to:

- Amarillo Wranglers (1968–1971), minor professional hockey team, affiliate of the Pittsburgh Penguins of the National Hockey League
- Amarillo Wranglers (1975–1977), minor professional ice hockey team in the Southwest Hockey League
- Amarillo Wranglers (NAHL), junior ice hockey team in the North American Hockey League
