= Tingley Coliseum =

Multi-purpose auditorium

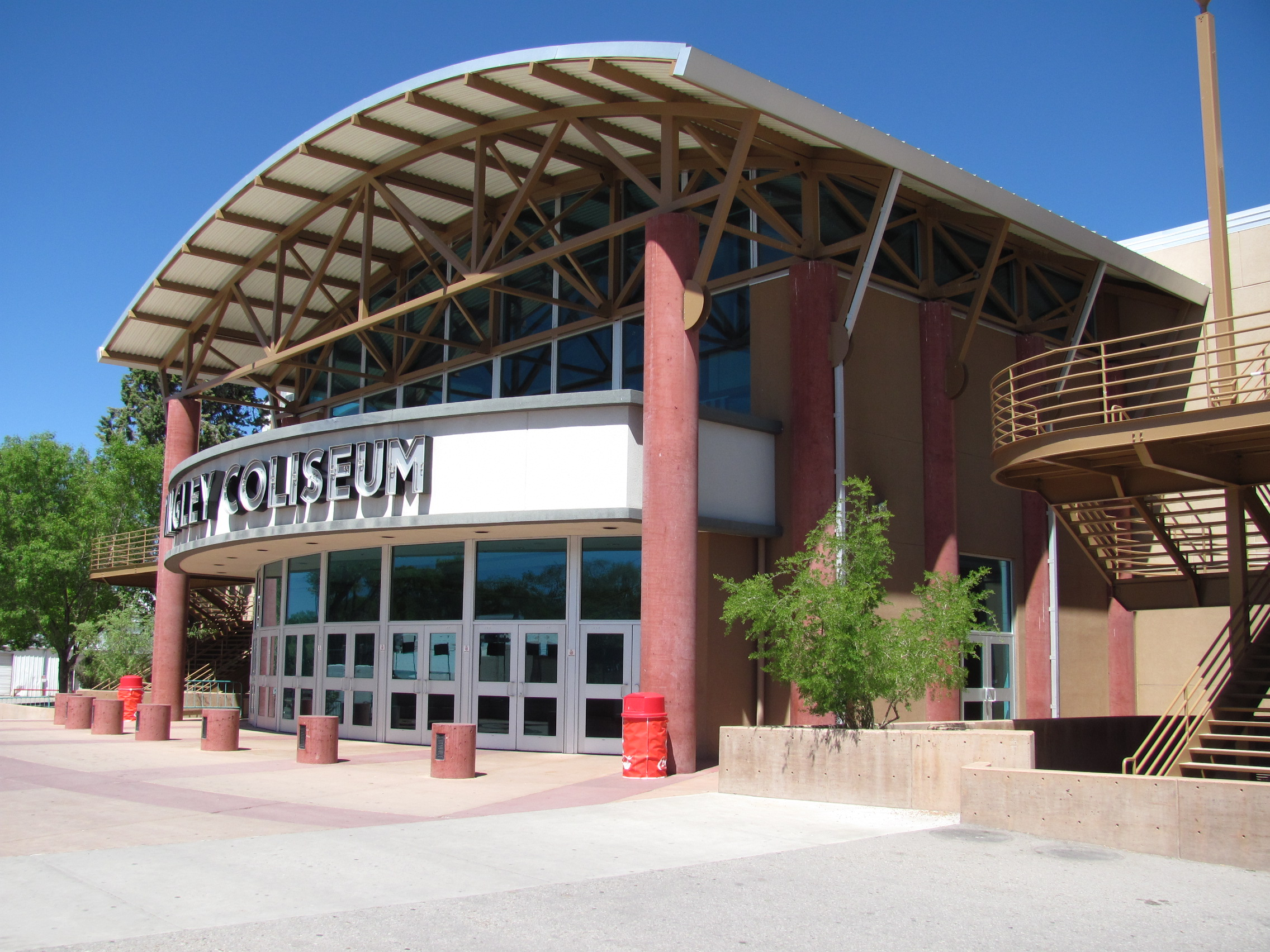

- Location within New Mexico Location within the United States
- Address: 300 San Pedro Drive NE
- Location: Albuquerque, New Mexico
- Coordinates: 35°4′56.69″N 106°34′20.74″W
- Owner: Expo New Mexico
- Capacity: 11,571
- Type: Arena

Construction
- Groundbreaking: 1940
- Opened: 1957

Tenants
- Albuquerque Six-Guns (CHL) (1973–1974); Albuquerque Chaparrals (SWHL) (1975–1977); New Mexico Scorpions (WPHL/CHL) (1996–2005); New Mexico Slam (IBL) (1999–2001); Albuquerque Thunderbirds (NBA D-League) (2005–2010); New Mexico Chupacabras (IFL) (2026–)

Website
- www.exponm.com

Tingley Coliseum is an 11,571-seat multi-purpose arena in Albuquerque, New Mexico. Originally built as a rodeo and horse show auditorium, it is located at 300 San Pedro Drive N.E.

It was home to the Albuquerque Six-Guns and New Mexico Scorpions ice hockey teams and the Albuquerque Thunderbirds of the NBA Development League from 2005 to 2010. The latter two later relocated to the Santa Ana Star Center in Rio Rancho. It was also home to the New Mexico Slam basketball team from 1999 until they folded in 2001. Tingley Coliseum contains 9,286 permanent seats.

Beginning with the 2015 season, Champions Indoor Football added the Duke City Gladiators as an expansion team. They joined the Indoor Football League in 2019.

== History ==
In 1916, the New Mexico State Fair was not held due to financial difficulties and the lack of a suitable location. Many held out hope, but the state fair was canceled every year for over two decades.

It was the end of the state fair until, in 1937, a group of New Mexico businessmen led by Governor Clyde Tingley convinced President Franklin D. Roosevelt to grant Works Progress Administration (WPA) funds for the construction of fairground buildings in the middle of Albuquerque, of which Tingley Coliseum would be the center.

Over the next several years, more than $500,000 in WPA funds and more than a million adobe bricks were used for the construction of buildings. It took much longer than expected, finishing in 1957, seventeen years after construction began. Though the Coliseum took nearly two decades to complete, the rest of the fairgrounds did not take nearly as long, which enabled the State Fair to reopen in 1938.

The Coliseum was dedicated at the opening of the 1957 New Mexico State Fair and was named in honor of Governor Tingley. Roy Rogers and Dale Evans played the entire run of that year's nine-day fair.

== Notable events ==
Tingley Coliseum is used for a myriad of civic gatherings, beyond the State Fair, including concerts, sporting events, and ice shows.

Entertainers who have appeared at Tingley include Journey, Ike & Tina Turner, Garth Brooks, Shakira, WWE, UFC, The Kinks, Mötley Crüe, Ronnie James Dio, Quiet Riot, Dokken, Janet Jackson, Tom Petty and the Heartbreakers, Neil Young, Pearl Jam (1998), AC/DC, Iron Maiden (1982), Metallica, Kiss, Bob Dylan, Gloria Estefan, Jay-Z, Van Halen, Iron Maiden, Tool, Rush, Aerosmith, James Brown, Elton John, Tower of Power (1977), Cher, Ozzy Osbourne, Fleetwood Mac (1979), Eric Clapton, No Doubt, Bon Jovi, Vinnie Vincent Invasion, Chris Brown, Earth, Wind and Fire, For King & Country, Red Hot Chili Peppers, Eric Church, Prince (1997), Olivia Newton-John, Robert Palmer (1988), Billy Joel (1979), Lionel Richie (1984), Eddie Murphy (1987), David Cassidy (1971) and Elvis Presley (1972) among others.

The 1966 National AAU Indoor Track and Field Championships were held at Tingley Coliseum.

It also hosted the 1987 Miss USA pageant. Michelle Royer won.

Floyd Mayweather Jr. fought the second fight of his undefeated career at the Coliseum.

The Professional Bull Riders (PBR) held one of their signature Premier Series events, the Ty Murray Invitational, annually, from 1997 through 2008 at Tingley Coliseum. In 2009, the event was moved to The Pit, on the University of New Mexico campus.

In 2025, the documentary film directed by Baz Luhrmann titled “EPiC: Elvis Presley in Concert” features clips taken during Elvis Presley’s concert in the coliseum on April 19, 1972.
