= El Paso County Coliseum =

Indoor arena in El Paso, Texas, U.S.

Coordinates: 31°45′59″N 106°26′35″W

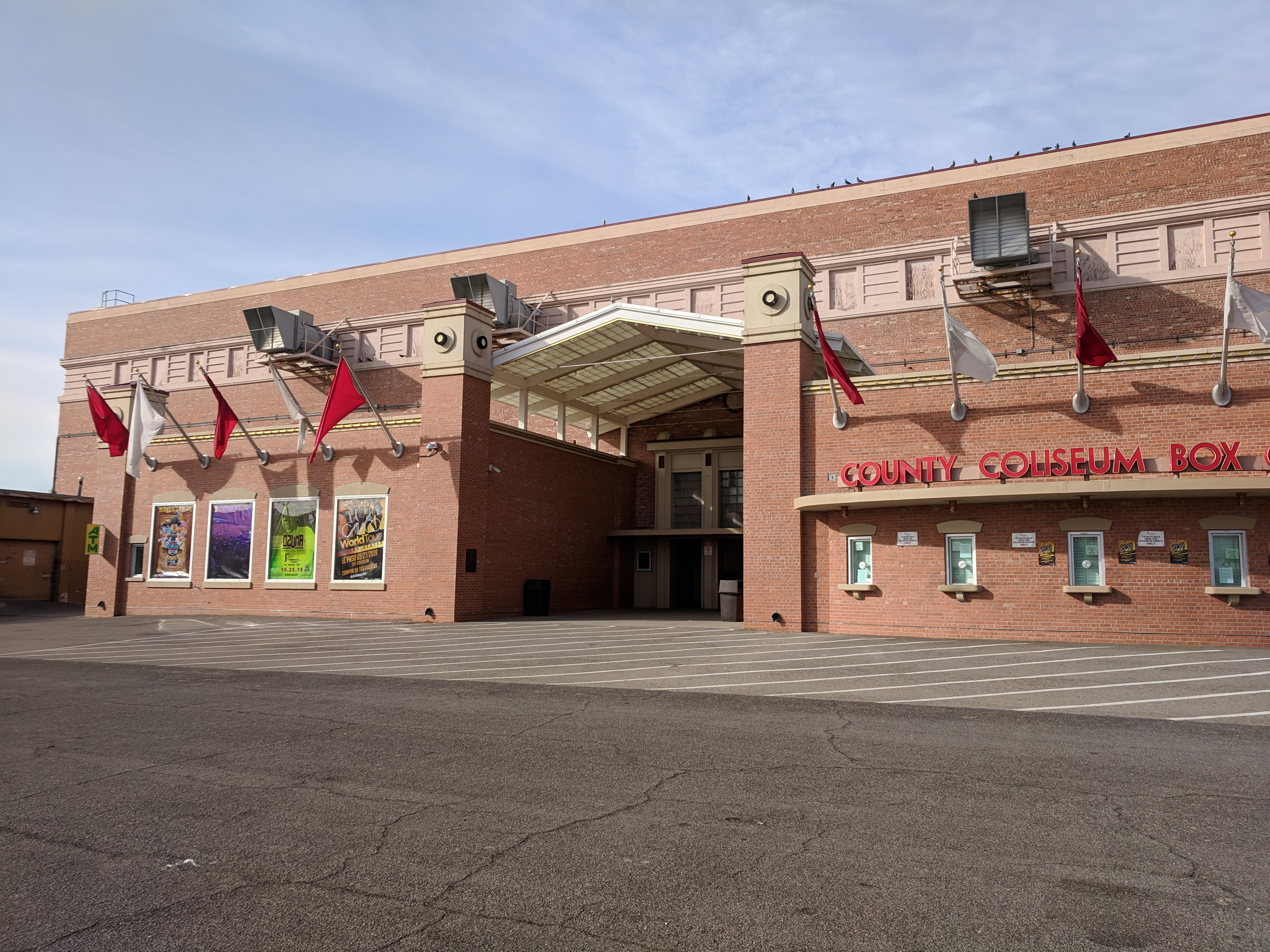
- El Paso County Coliseum entrance.
- Interactive map of El Paso County Coliseum
- Address: 4100 East Paisano Street
- Location: El Paso, Texas, U.S.
- Owner: El Paso Sports Commission
- Operator: El Paso Sports Commission
- Capacity: 6,500 seated. Total in dispute - either 6,500 or 11,000
- Surface: Multi-surface

Construction
- Groundbreaking: 1939
- Opened: May 21, 1942
- Renovated: 2004
- Cost: $321,000; $9.5 million (renovation)

Tenants
- El Paso Raiders (SWHL) (1975–1976); El Paso Buzzards (WPHL/CHL) (1996–2003); El Paso Rumble (Intense) (2004); El Paso Generals (IFL) (2009); El Paso Coyotes (MASL) (2016–2019); Cuervos de Juarez (M2) (2018–2019); West Texas Buccaneers (AAL) (2021)

Website
- epcountycoliseum.com

El Paso County Coliseum is a multi-purpose indoor arena located in El Paso, Texas, United States. It opened on May 21, 1942 and was built originally to support a rodeo and livestock show, but later expanded to cater other types of events. A variety of events that have been held at the Coliseum have included hockey, high school graduations, basketball, boxing, circus, concerts, dog shows, flower shows, Ice capades, roller derby, wrestling and more. In addition to events, the Coliseum was also used to temporarily house prisoners of war, braceros and the Texas State Guard.

== History ==
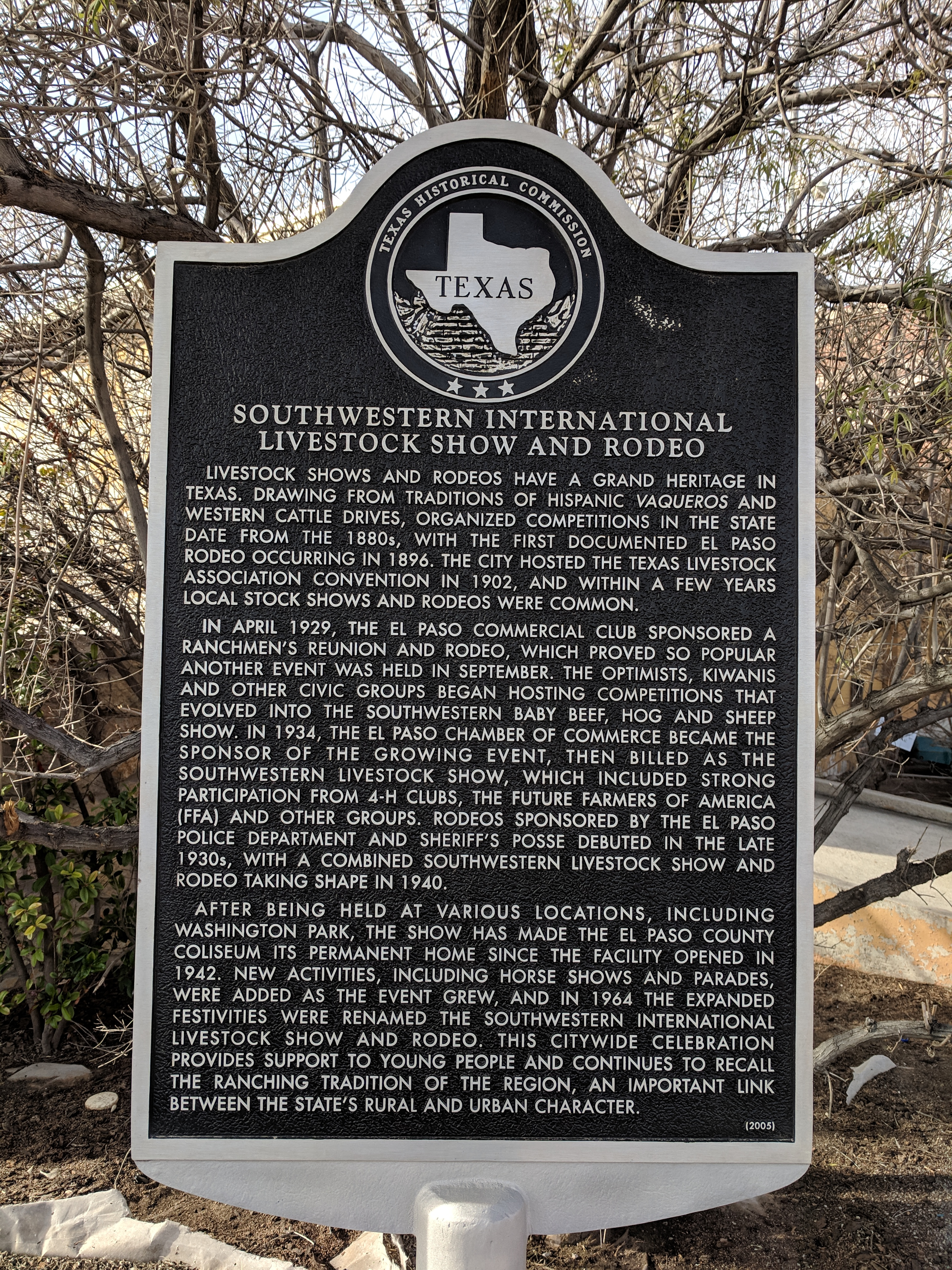
Texas Historical Commission marker at the El Paso County Coliseum.

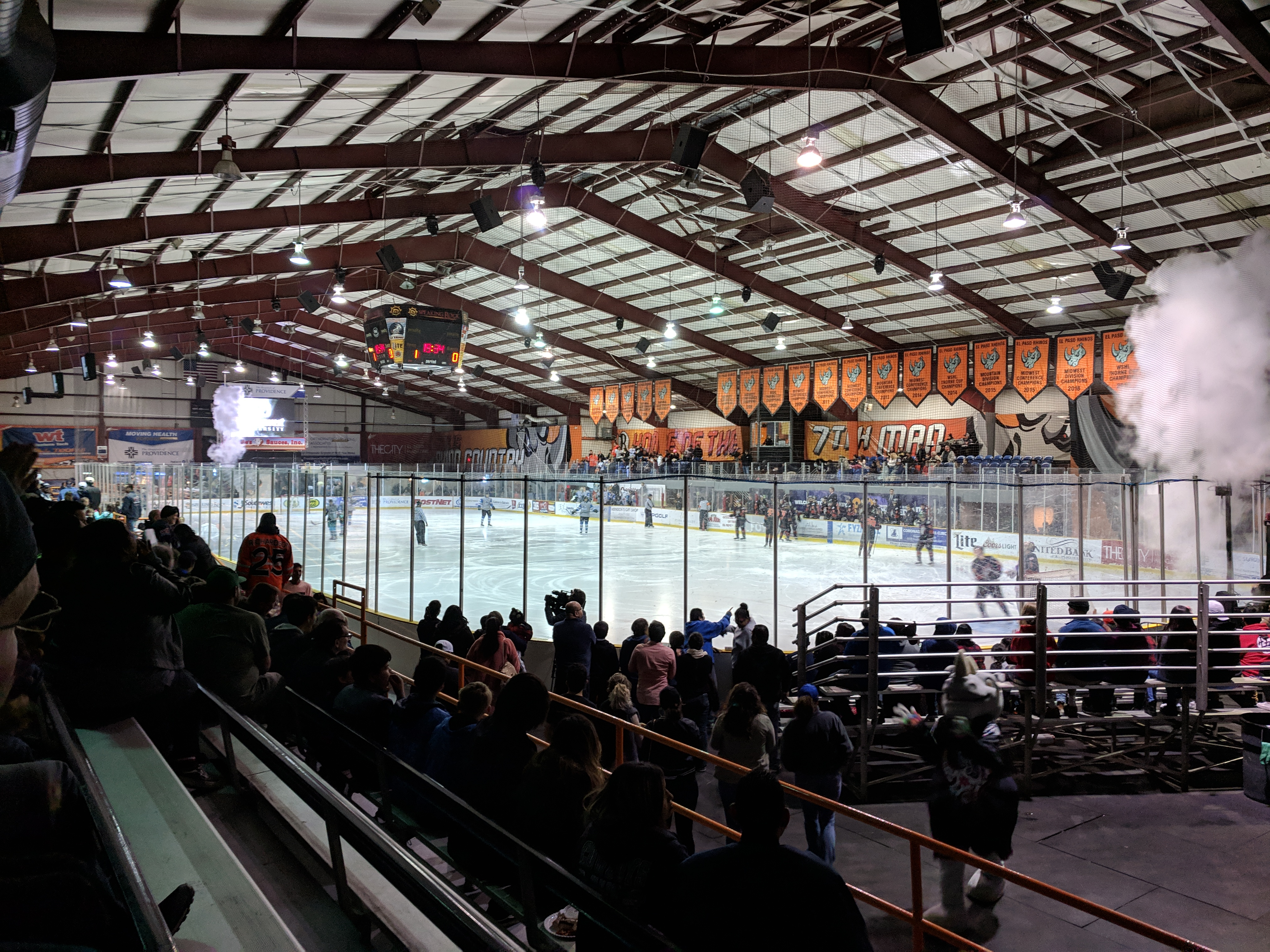
El Paso County Events Center hosting an El Paso Rhinos game on March 8 2019.

The El Paso County Coliseum was originally built to host rodeo events in the city of El Paso. The original plan for the building, which was backed by El Paso County, and could be supported by a Public Works Administration (PWA) grant, estimated that it would cost $100,000. The final cost for the building was $321,000. The building's architect was Percy McGhee. At first it was called the "El Paso County Live Stock & Agricultural Exhibition Building," or referred to as the "Livestock Exposition Building." It is located in South El Paso, near Washington Park. When it was dedicated, it was the largest coliseum between Los Angeles, Fort Worth and Denver. Behind the main coliseum, which was equipped with an air-cooling system, are several livestock buildings.

The building was dedicated on May 21, 1942 in a party that drew local farmers and El Paso business people together for a barbecue dinner that also celebrated "Cotton Week." The dedication barbecue dinner cost $1 per person. The event featured actors playing characters such as "King Cotton," Uncle Sam and "Miss America" who would be escorted by military color guard from Fort Bliss. The band from Bowie High School was on hand to play while attendees ate. The dedication event saw around 5000 attendees and the El Paso Times called it "an epoch in local history." Karl O. Wyler served as master of ceremonies.

The first event the Coliseum hosted was the El Paso Sheriff's Posse Rodeo in June 1942. In 1943, approval was received from Major C.L. Whitmarsh to house Italian prisoners of war inside the Coliseum building. The prisoners were expected to pick cotton. Prisoners were moved to the Coliseum in September 1943, some of them coming from a concentration camp in Lordsburg, New Mexico. Concerned El Pasoans donated games and instruments to the prisoners for recreational purposes. The Italian prisoners remained in the Coliseum until around March 1944. The Texas State Guard used the Coliseum as temporary headquarters in 1946. The Coliseum was again used to house people in 1951, this time temporarily sheltering braceros.

In 1944, El Paso City Council proposed additional civic programs for the Coliseum as the building had not been making a profit. Plans to open up the Coliseum to sporting events such as boxing and wrestling was proposed in 1945. New speakers were installed for free by the Radio Corporation of America (RCA) in 1946.

Ike & Tina Turner performed at the Coliseum on July 2, 1966.

On November 10, 1972, Elvis Presley performed at the coliseum to a sold-out crowd of 9,000.

The Grateful Dead made their only ever El Paso appearance on November, 23, 1973.

On May 15, 1975, Fleetwood Mac began their first American tour with newly hired members Stevie Nicks and Lindsey Buckingham at the Coliseum, a 128-date tour that stretched well into the following year, in support of their soon-to-be-released self-titled album.

On, October 19, 1973, The Jacksons performed at the coliseum as part of The Jackson 5 World Tour which stretched from March 2, 1973 to December 1975, and performed on July 22, 1977.

On June 4, 1980, a concert by Alice Cooper was recorded by ABC Radio as part of their SuperGroups In Concert series

Iron Maiden performed here in 1982, 1986, 1987 and their final show at the coliseum was in 1999 during the Ed Hunter Tour.

Around 1996, the Coliseum began to experience roofing issues due to wind damage. In 2000, discussions about creating a new coliseum were ongoing. In 2001, renovations on the Coliseum began which included adding more restrooms, access for people with disabilities and a meeting room. Urban Associates began additional renovations in January 2003 that was projected to cost $6.7 million and include new heating and cooling, improved seating, new concession stands, new roofing and more. Discussions about privatization of the Coliseum were taking place in 2003. In September 2003, supervision of the Coliseum was given to El Paso Sports Commission Inc., for a five-year contract.

In 2020, El Paso was the winner of Kraft Hockeyville USA, winning $150,000 in rink upgrades and $10,000 worth of new equipment.

On March 14, 2025, the Coliseum hosted Total Nonstop Action Wrestling's Sacrifice event which was streamed live on TNA+. The following night, 2 episodes of TNA Impact were taped.

== Disputed capacity ==
February 11, 2019, President Donald J. Trump came to visit El Paso as a follow-up to his State of the Union address the week before. The attendance at this rally is in dispute and authoritative information is contradictory. El Paso Times reports that

Enrique D Aguilar, fire public information officer, said no special permission was given by the Fire Department, and the Coliseum had about 6,500 people in it during the president's rally — at capacity, but well within its standard allowance.

A United States Department of Transportation case study of PSEs in the El Paso metropolitan area dated August 2008 classifies the Coliseum as a "specially designed facility with event days generating crowds of more than 10,000 people." It states that the Coliseum "is a 5,250-seat multi-purpose arena in El Paso. The Coliseum opened in 1942 and can be adapted to seat up to 11,000 for concerts."
