= All Seasons Arena =

All Seasons Arenas may refer to:

- All Seasons Arena (Mankato), Minnesota, United States
- All Seasons Arena (Minot), North Dakota, United States
