= Bismarck Capitols =

- City: Bismarck, North Dakota
- League: Southwest Hockey League
- Operated: 1976
- Home arena: Schaumberg Ice Arena

The Bismarck Capitols were a semi-professional ice hockey team playing in Bismarck, North Dakota. The Capitols were members of the Southwest Hockey League but played just 20 games before suspending operations due to financial difficulty.

== History ==
For the second season of the Southwest Hockey League, the El Paso Raiders moved to Minot in part as way to help with the travel costs of the Billings Blazers. As a way to aid the move, a second team was placed in North Dakota when the Bismarck Capitols were created, taking the place of the Reno Broncos who had disbanded during their first season. Though the state had a long history of ice hockey, mostly with the University of North Dakota, the Capitols were not successful at drawing a crowd. Just 20 games into the season, Bismarck had a decent record at 8–12 but they were no longer able to continue and ceased operations on November 23. The Capitols were a microcosm of the league and the SWHL wasn't able to finish out the year, imploding on January 24 with all remaining teams dissolving the following day.

== Season record ==
Note: GP = Games played, W = Wins, L = Losses, T = Ties, Pts = Points, GF = Goals for, GA = Goals against

Season	GP	W	L	T	Pts	GF	GA	Finish	Playoffs
1976–1977	20	8	12	0	16	–	–	–	N/A
