= Minot Raiders =

- City: Minot, North Dakota
- League: Southwest Hockey League
- Operated: 1976–1977
- Home arena: All Seasons Arena

Franchise history
- 1975–1976: El Paso Raiders
- 1976–1977: Minot Raiders
- 1977: Minot Rangers

The Minot Raiders are a defunct professional ice hockey team which played in the Southwest Hockey League for a little under a year from 1976 to 1977.

== History ==
The franchise was one of the original six teams and began play as the El Paso Raiders, playing out of the El Paso County Coliseum. After 37 games in El Paso, the team's situation had worsened to the point that they could no longer continue. After the dissolution of the Reno Broncos earlier in the season, Ralph Engelstad didn't want to see two of his new clubs vanish in the during the first year and moved the Raiders north to Minot on January 25. The team was able to stabilize their financial situation in the short term and finished out the year at the All Seasons Arena.

A second team was placed in North Dakota for the start of the league's second season, which would help to alleviate travel costs following the offseason relocation of the Butte Copper Kings. Unfortunately, the Bismarck Capitols only lasted 20 games and the rest of the SWHL wasn't in much better shape. In the midst of the league's troubles, the Raiders were renamed as the 'Rangers' on January 12 but the new moniker lasted less than two weeks. The Rangers, along with the rest of the SWHL, permanently suspended operations on January 24.

== Season record ==
Combined records of the franchise Note: GP = Games played, W = Wins, L = Losses, T = Ties, Pts = Points, GF = Goals for, GA = Goals against

Season	GP	W	L	T	Pts	GF	GA	Finish	Playoffs
1975–1976	72	28	41	3	59	309	382	5th	—
1976–1977	49	22	27	0	44	252	254	3rd	N/A
