= Anthony Richardson (basketball) =

American basketball player (born 1983)

Kansas City Roos
- Position: Assistant coach
- League: Summit League

Personal information
- Born: July 29, 1983 (age 43) Raleigh, North Carolina, U.S.
- Listed height: 6 ft 7 in (2.01 m)
- Listed weight: 225 lb (102 kg)

Career information
- High school: Leesville Road (Raleigh, North Carolina)
- College: Florida State (2001–2005)
- NBA draft: 2005: undrafted
- Playing career: 2006–2015

Career history

Playing
- 2006–2007: Butte Daredevils
- 2007: Kansas Cagerz
- 2007: BSG Ludwigsburg
- 2008–2010: EiffelTowers Den Bosch
- 2010–2011: New Mexico Thunderbirds
- 2011: Reno Bighorns
- 2011–2012: Aishin Sea Horses
- 2012: Reno Bighorns
- 2012–2013: Fort Wayne Mad Ants
- 2013–2014: Busan KT Sonicboom
- 2014: Goyang Orions
- 2014–2015: Wonju DB Promy

Coaching
- 2018–2021: Northland Christian School (MO)
- 2021–2023: William Chrisman HS (MO) (assistant)
- 2023–present: UMKC (assistant)

Career highlights
- KBL All-Star (2014); Dutch Cup winner (2009); 2× DBL All-Star (2009, 2010); First-team All-DBL (2009); USBL champion (2007); USBL Player of the Year (2007); USBL scoring champion (2007); First-team All-USBL (2007); CBA All-Star (2007); McDonald's All-American (2001); Third-team Parade All-American (2001); North Carolina Mr. Basketball (2001)

Anthony Lamont Richardson (born July 29, 1983) is an American former professional basketball player. He was one of the top prospects of the high school class of 2001, being named North Carolina Mr. Basketball and a McDonald's All-American. He played 4 years of college basketball for the Florida State Seminoles, and went undrafted in the 2005 NBA draft. He then earned an all-star selection in the CBA and was named the 2007 USBL Player of the Year while also leading the league in scoring. He played 9 years of professional basketball in Germany, Japan, South Korea, the Netherlands and in the NBA D-League.

== High school career ==
Richardson is the son of Norman Primous and Mary Richardson, and was born and raised in Raleigh, North Carolina, where he attended Leesville Road High School. He played 4 years of varsity basketball at Leesville, where he was coached by Darryl Robinson; he gained national recognition during his senior year, when he contributed to lead the team to the 4A state championship game, which Leesville lost to Richard J. Reynolds High School 94–73. Richardson was ranked the no. 9 power forward and the no. 50 player in the nation by ESPN, while Bob Gibbons ranked him 18th overall, and 1st in the state of North Carolina. During his high school years he played both the power forward and the small forward positions.

He averaged 18 points, 9 rebounds and 3 assists per game in his senior season, and was named 2001 North Carolina Mr. Basketball. His successful senior year earned him a selection as a McDonald's All-American and in the Parade All-America Third Team. In the 2001 McDonald's game, which was played in Durham, North Carolina, he wore jersey number 45 (his usual 54 was taken by Kwame Brown) and he scored 10 points, shooting 4/10 from the field and 2/3 from the free throw line. He also played in another high school all-star game, the Capital Classic, where he scored 7 points (2/9 shooting, 3/4 on free throws).

== College career ==
Richardson was recruited by several NCAA Division I programs, and considered offers from Clemson, Florida State, NC State, East Carolina, Maryland and Wake Forest. He committed to Florida State in the fall of 2000, being the first player to commit for the Seminoles that year, and the sixth McDonald's All-American to sign for Florida State. After initially falling short on his SAT college admissions test, he qualified instead on the ACT. He was diagnosed with a learning disability, and his grades put his NCAA eligibility on the line: he had to follow additional summer courses in order to achieve the required grades, and in September 2001 the NCAA granted him full eligibility.

Richardson chose to wear jersey number 54 (his high school number). Florida State's most decorated recruit since Randell Jackson in 1995, he found it difficult to live up to the pressure as a freshman. He played 27 games, averaging 18.3 minutes per game and posting averages of 7.1 points, 3.7 rebounds and 1 assist per game. He recorded a season-high 19 points against NC State on January 8, 2002. During the season he was once named ACC Rookie of the Week, and at the end of his first year he was selected as an All-ACC freshman team honorable mention, and he was also an All-ACC Academic Selection for his good grades.

In 2002 coach Steve Robinson left the Seminoles and was replaced by Leonard Hamilton, who decided to give Richardson a starting role in the team. As a result, Richardson saw his playing time increased to 29 minutes per game, and as a sophomore he recorded career-highs in all the major statistical categories with 12.4 points, 5.3 rebounds, 1.5 assists, 1.2 steals and 1.1 blocks. He also recorded a new single game high with 20 points (including 10/10 from the foul line) along with 9 rebounds against Georgia Tech on January 14, 2003. He was second in the team for scoring and rebounding behind Tim Pickett.

His junior year saw him starting the first 16 games of the season, and on December 1, 2003, he recorded a new career-high with 27 points on 10/13 shooting (4/5 on free throws) against Northwestern. He then lost his starting role and came off the bench for the rest of the season, averaging 7.3 points, 3.6 rebounds and 1 assist per game. As a senior he only started 8 games out of 29, recording his best shooting percentages but also career-lows in points, rebounds and assists per game. He led his team in free throw percentage in his junior and senior year.

=== College statistics ===
| Year | Team | GP | GS | MPG | FG% | 3P% | FT% | RPG | APG | SPG | BPG | PPG |
|---|---|---|---|---|---|---|---|---|---|---|---|---|
| 2001–02 | Florida State | 27 | 0 | 18.3 | .328 | .299 | .632 | 3.7 | 1.0 | 0.8 | 0.6 | 7.1 |
| 2002–03 | Florida State | 29 | 24 | 29.0 | .470 | .297 | .788 | 5.3 | 1.5 | 1.2 | 1.1 | 12.4 |
| 2003–04 | Florida State | 33 | 16 | 17.9 | .433 | .304 | .815 | 3.6 | 1.0 | 0.8 | 0.6 | 7.3 |
| 2004–05 | Florida State | 29 | 8 | 15.6 | .508 | .326 | .822 | 3.5 | 0.7 | 0.5 | 0.6 | 6.4 |
| Career | | 118 | 48 | 20.1 | .432 | .305 | .770 | 4.0 | 1.1 | 0.8 | 0.7 | 8.3 |

== Professional career ==
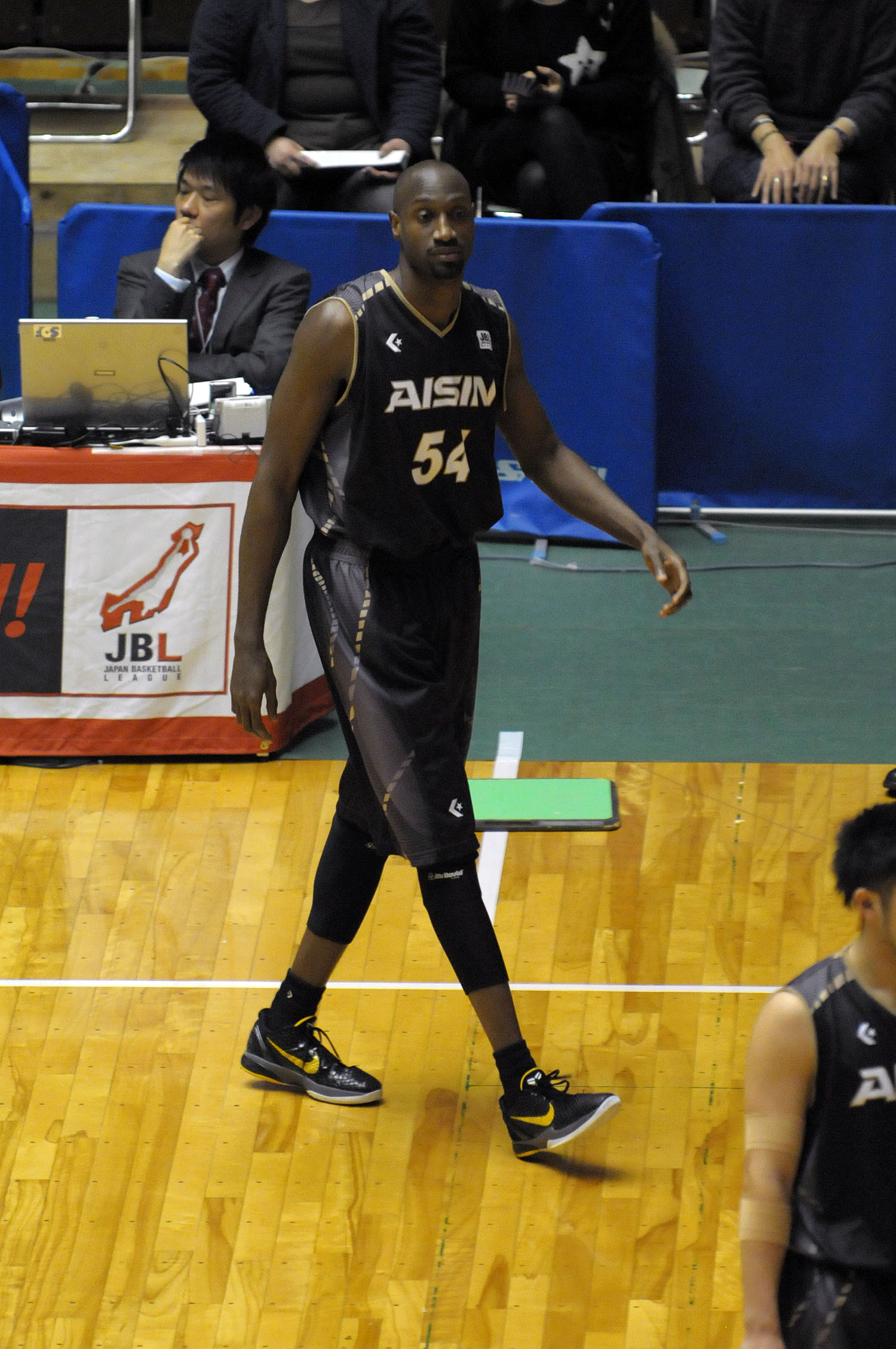

After his senior year of college Richardson was automatically eligible for the 2005 NBA draft, but he was not selected by an NBA franchise. He then signed for the Butte Daredevils of the Continental Basketball Association and in 46 games (42 starts) he averaged 15.5 points, 5.7 rebounds, 2 assists and 1.3 blocks in 31.9 minutes per game in the 2006–07 CBA season. He was named in the all-star team and he also won that year's slam dunk contest, dunking from the free throw line. After his experience in the CBA he moved to the United States Basketball League, signing for the Kansas Cagerz. He led the league in scoring with 20 points per game, won the USBL league title and was named the Player of the Year. He was also part of the all-USBL first team.

In 2007 he participated in the Las Vegas NBA Summer League with the New Orleans Hornets, and he played 5 games (1 start) averaging 13 points, 4.4 rebounds and 0.6 blocks in 24.4 minutes per game. However, the Hornets waived him on October 12, 2007 and Richardson moved to Europe, signing for German team BSG Ludwigsburg: he played 3 games in the Basketball Bundesliga (averaging 4 points and 1.7 rebounds) and 4 games in the 2007–08 ULEB Cup, where he averaged 10.3 points, 4.5 rebounds and 1 assist in 24.3 minutes per game. He then transferred to the Netherlands, joining EiffelTowers Den Bosch where he played two seasons in the top level of Dutch basketball, participating both years in the FIBA EuroChallenge: in this competition he averaged 15.5 points and 4.9 rebounds in 12 games in 2008–09, while in 2009–10 he averaged 12.9 points and 4.8 rebounds in 12 appearances. He also won the 2008–09 NBB Cup while playing for Den Bosch, and was selected as an all-star in 2009 and 2010: he won the slam dunk contest during the 2009 DBL All-Star Gala.

Richardson decided to go back to the United States and was selected in the second round of the 2010 NBA Development League draft by the New Mexico Thunderbirds. He played 13 games with the team, averaging 11.5 points and 7.4 rebounds before transferring to the Reno Bighorns, where he ended the 2010–11 season starting 27 of 30 games played with averages of 14.3 points and 6.8 rebounds in 31.1 minutes per game. In 2011 Richardson moved outside the US again, this time joining Japanese team Aishin Sea Horses. In 41 games in the top tier of Japanese basketball he recorded 10 points, 5.1 rebounds and 1.4 blocks per contest, playing 19.4 minutes. After the season ended he went back to the Reno Bighorns in the NBA D-League, and briefly played for the team (6 games) after signing for the Fort Wayne Mad Ants where he ended the 2012–13 D-League season with overall averages of 13.3 points and 4.7 rebounds per game.

In 2013 he was selected in the first round of the Korean Basketball League draft by Busan KT Sonicboom. He was an all-star selection for the 2013–14 season, during which he played for two teams. He initially played for the Busan KT Sonicboom, where in 23 appearances he averaged 17.7 points, 5.4 rebounds, 2.4 assists and 1.1 blocks, and then signed for the Goyang Orions where he ended the season playing 33 more games, recording 14.2 points and 5.3 rebounds. During the 2014 all-star game in the KBL he won the slam dunk contest. His last professional experience was the 2014–15 KBL season, played with the Wonju DB Promy, where in 63 games he averaged 10.8 points, 3.7 rebounds and 1.2 assists in 15.5 minutes per game.

== Professional Coaching Career ==
From August 2018 to May 2021 Anthony was the Head Boy's Varsity Coach at Northland Christian School, leading the team through multiple seasons and fostering development of student-athletes. Transitioning to in May 2021 to William Chrisman High School as the Assistant Boys Basketball Coach. In this role, he was responsible for defensive coordination and assisting long time head coach achieve school record breaking seasons. In 2023, Anthony joined the University of Missouri-Kansas City as an Assistant Men's Basketball Coach. He is currently serving in this position, contributing to the team's development and success.
