= Jerry Bell =

Jerry Bell may refer to:

- Jerry Bell (American football) (born 1959), American football player
- Jerry Bell (pitcher) (born 1947), American baseball player
- Jerry Bell (baseball executive) (born 1937), American baseball executive

== See also ==
- Jeremy Bell (disambiguation)
- Gerry Bell (disambiguation)
- Jerome Bell, musician
- Gerard Bell, actor, see Bryony Lavery
- Gerald Bell (disambiguation)
