= Salt Lake Community College =

Public college in Salt Lake County, Utah, US

- Former names: Salt Lake Area Vocational School (1948–1959); Salt Lake Trade Technical Institute (1959–1967); Utah Technical College at Salt Lake (1967–1987)
- Motto: Step Ahead
- Type: Public community college
- Established: 1948
- Parent institution: Utah System of Higher Education
- Affiliations: NJCAA; Scenic West Athletic Conference
- President: Greg Peterson
- Faculty: 346 full-time faculty
- Students: 26,300 (fall 2022)
- Location: Salt Lake County, Utah, United States; 40°40′20″N 111°56′40″W
- Campus: Urban
- Colors: Royal Blue and Gold
- Mascot: Brutus the Bruin Bear
- Website: www.slcc.edu

Salt Lake Community College (SLCC) is a public community college in Salt Lake County, Utah. It is the state's largest two-year college with the most diverse student body. It serves almost 50,000 students on eight campuses, as well as through online classes. The college has a student-to-faculty ratio of 19:1. Since SLCC is a community college, it focuses on providing associate degrees that students can transfer to any other four-year university in the state to satisfy their first two years of requirements for a bachelor's degree. SLCC has open enrollment and serves the local community, with about 95% of the student body considered Utah residents.

== Campuses ==
=== Taylorsville Redwood Campus (1967) ===
Located at 4600 South Redwood Road in Taylorsville, the Taylorsville Redwood Campus is the primary campus and harbors the school's student center and main offices. Serving over 15,000 students a year, the campus is spread across two city blocks in 12 academic buildings, housing a library (about 90,000 volumes), athletic facilities, an amphitheater, and a student union.

Anime Banzai and Anime Salt Lake, which are two different anime conventions, were both initially held at the Taylorsville Redwood campus. The Rocky Mountain Revue, a preseason basketball tournament sponsored by the NBA's Utah Jazz, was hosted in the Lifetime Activities Center until 2008. The arena has hosted professional basketball teams over the years, including the Utah Snowbears, the Salt Lake Dream, the Utah Eagles, and the Salt Lake City Stars.

=== South City (1992) ===
East entrance of South City Campus

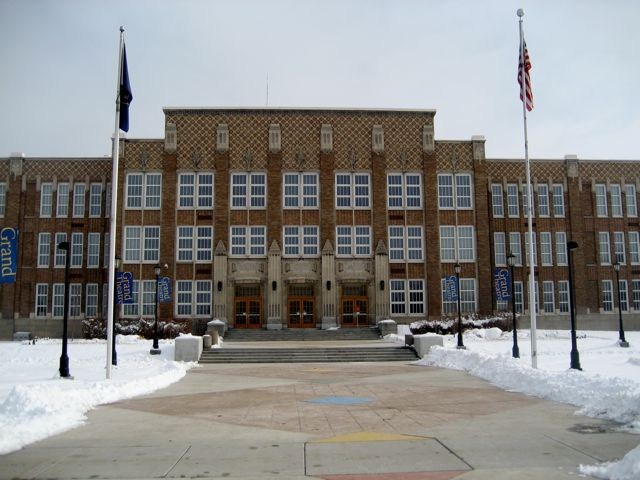
West entrance of South City Campus

Located at 1575 South State Street in Salt Lake City, the South City Campus occupies the former home of South High School. The campus houses classrooms, laboratories, and the Grand Theatre, home of the Grand Theatre Foundation and Community Institute. The Grand Theatre facility includes the Historic Fashion Collection, some 1,900 costumes ranging from 1890s to the present.

South City Campus added the Center for Arts and Media building in 2013, thanks to grants from the State of Utah and several community partners, including the George S. & Delores Doré Eccles Foundation and Adobe. This addition provides classroom and work space for 17 programs in the School of Arts and Communication, serving roughly 9,000 students.

=== Jordan Campus (2001) ===
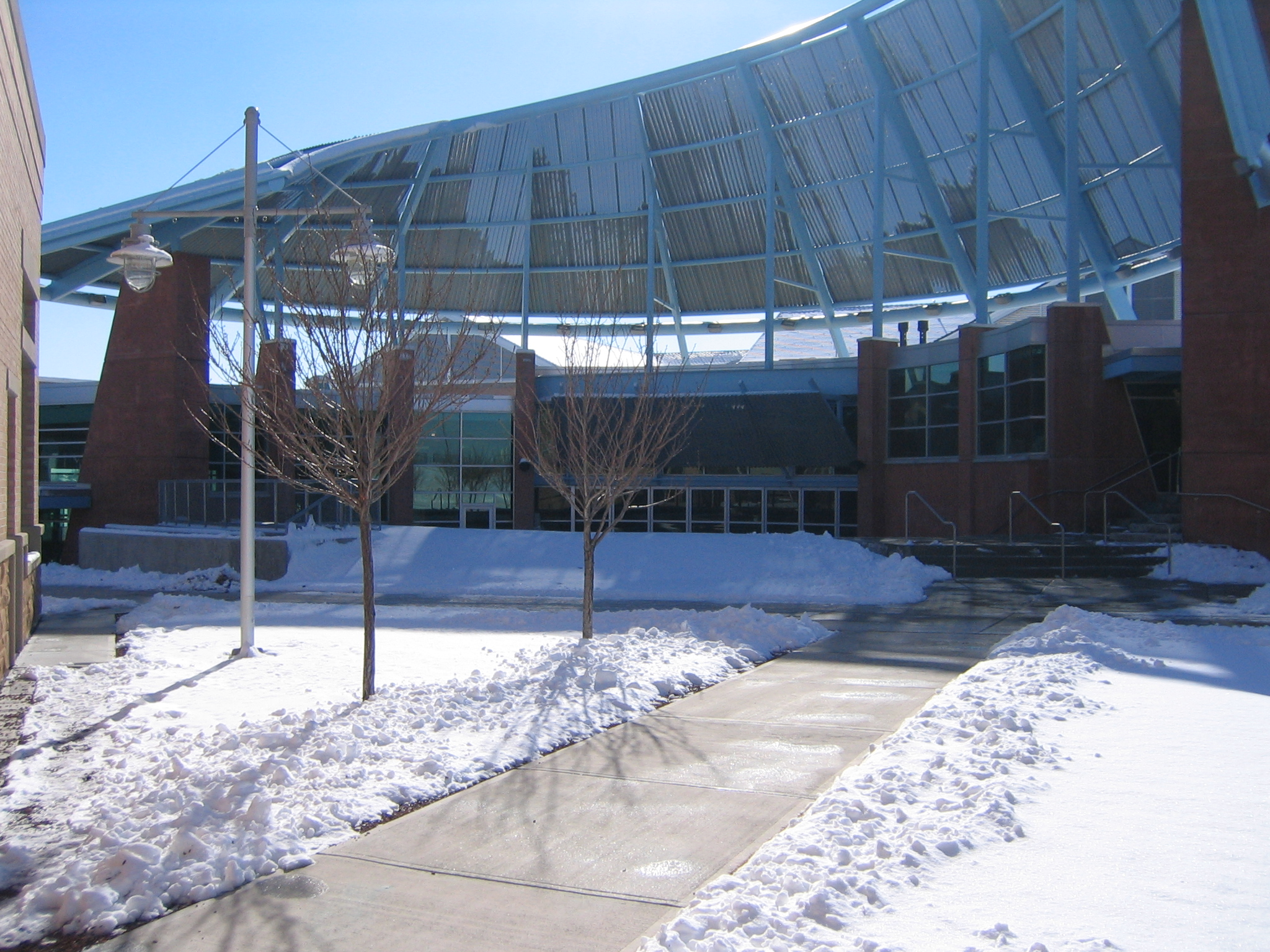
Salt Lake Community College Jordan Student Center building

Located at 3491 West 9000 South in West Jordan, the Jordan Campus is SLCC's third full-service campus. It houses a library, food court, financial aid, a dental clinic for the dental hygienist program, academic advising offices, and Cate Field (where the SLCC baseball team plays its home games).

The nursing program opened at the campus by 2007 in a five-story Health Science building. A UTA TRAX station is planned near the college. Other noncollege buildings on the campus include the Jordan School District applied technology center, Itineris Charter School built by Bill Gates, and an LDS Institute of Religion.

=== Miller Campus (2001) ===
Located at 9750 South 300 West in Sandy and opened in 2001, the Miller Campus was donated to SLCC by Larry H. Miller, the late owner of the Utah Jazz and the Salt Lake Bees. It is home to SLCC's Culinary Institute, and continuing education programs such as legal secretary, digital media technology, real-estate appraisal, and public safety/criminal justice. The Miller Business Resource Center offers four corporate training programs, and the Miller Business Innovation Center helps startup companies with operational and educational services. Training facilities for the Utah Department of Public Safety (DPS) on the campus include: Highway Patrol training, DPS development education center, the Utah Peace Officer Standards and Training academy, and the Department of Corrections training academy.

=== Meadowbrook Campus ===
The Meadowbrook Campus is home to general-education courses and several vocational and School of Applied Technology programs, including diesel systems technology; heating, ventilation, air conditioning; professional truck driving; professional pilot; and nondestructive testing.

=== Herriman Campus (2023) ===
Located at 14551 South Sentinel Ridge Blvd in Herriman and opened in 2023, the Herriman Campus is a collaboration between SLCC and the University of Utah. The two organizations jointly administer the campus, with the goal being to offer associate degrees at SLCC and allow students to continue their education at the University of Utah.

== Organization and administration ==
In September 2014, the Utah Board of Regents named Deneece Huftalin as the SLCC president. She served previously as vice president of student services. She replaced Cynthia Bioteau.

The Thayne Center is a nonprofit organization established in 1994 (originally named the Emma Lou Thayne Community Service Center) to coordinate a variety of service-related programs for SLCC. The college provides the bulk of the center's budget.

== Academics ==
SLCC offers over 200 degree and certificate programs in academic, technical, and vocational fields. It is accredited by the Northwest Association of Schools and Colleges, and many credits are transferable to the state's four-year colleges. More SLCC graduates attend the University of Utah than graduates of any other institution of higher learning.

== Student life ==
=== Sports ===
The SLCC Bruins have competed in the National Junior College Athletic Association (NJCAA) since 1985. Currently, the school fields men's teams in baseball, basketball, and soccer, and women's teams in basketball, softball, volleyball, and soccer. The Bruins have produced 54 NJCAA All-American athletes since 1985, and has produced 513 Academic All-Region honorees and 192 Academic All-Americans.

The men's basketball program advanced to the NJCAA championship game in 2008, but lost. The following season, the Bruins returned to the title game, this time defeating Midland College to claim the first national championship in school history. The Bruins returned to the title game in 2016, winning their second championship by defeating Hutchinson Community College, 74–64.

The men's soccer team captured the NJCAA national championship in 2021, just five years after the program transitioned from club status to formal NJCAA competition, by upsetting number-one Iowa Western in the title match. Two players from that squad, Ryen Jiba and Levonte Johnson, were later selected in the first round of the 2023 MLS SuperDraft.

The Bruins' men's baseball team captured the NJCAA championship in 2025, upsetting a heavily favored squad from Walters State College 9-6 in the final game of the JUCO World Series. SLCC entered the tournament as a number-eight seed, whereas Walters State was the top seed and led the entire nation in scoring, averaging 11.7 runs per contest. SLCC was able to contain Walters State to claim the crown, becoming the lowest-seeded program ever to win the junior college national title.

Prominent professional athletes who trained and competed at SLCC include Eddy Alvarez (baseball), Justin Braun (soccer), Eddie Gill (basketball), Gary Payton II (basketball), and Chris Shelton (baseball).

=== Mascot ===
Salt Lake Community College's mascot is a bruin, "Brutus". He appears at local parades and performs at the women's volleyball and men's basketball games. Brutus has his own Facebook page.
