= Anime Salt Lake =

Anime convention in Taylorsville, Utah

Coordinates: 40°40′20″N 111°56′40″W

- Status: Defunct
- Genre: Anime, pop culture
- Venue: Salt Lake Community College Redwood Campus
- Location: Taylorsville, Utah
- Inaugurated: 2012
- Most recent: 2014
- Attendance: 926 in 2012
- Organizer: Verses Versus Productions

Anime Salt Lake was an anime convention held at the Salt Lake Community College (SLCC) Redwood Campus in Taylorsville, Utah, United States.

== Programming ==
The convention featured an artists' alley, dealers' room, fan discussion panels, live-action roleplaying, panels, screenings, and video game contests.

== History ==
The convention was founded by members of the SLCC Japanese Club, but the club closed due to having no adviser. The convention was then run by Verses Versus Productions and had involvement from many SLCC students.

=== Event history ===
Dates	Location	Atten.	Guests
March 2–3, 2012	Salt Lake Community College Redwood Campus; Taylorsville, Utah	926	Bryan Young, COO-Interactive Entertainment, and Quik Wits Comedy Improv.
March 22–23, 2013	Salt Lake Community College Redwood Campus; Taylorsville, Utah		COO-Interactive Entertainment, Chris Rager, and Brett Young.
June 13–14, 2014	Salt Lake Community College Redwood Campus; Taylorsville, Utah		COO-Interactive Entertainment and Chris Rager.
