= Nick VanderLaan =

American basketball player (born 1979)

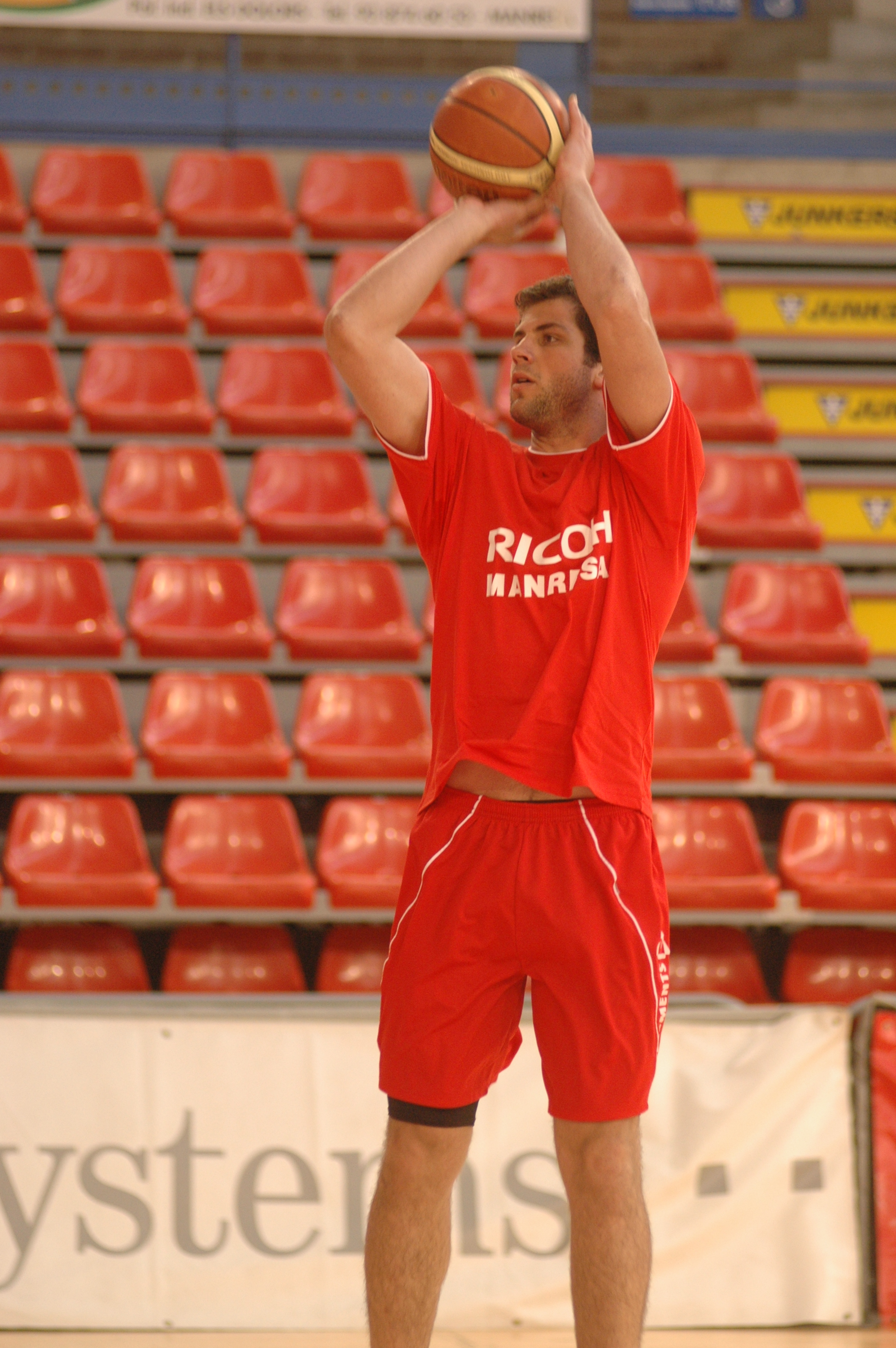
- VanderLaan with Ricoh Manresa in 2007

Personal information
- Born: October 27, 1979 (age 47) Long Beach, California
- Listed height: 6 ft 10 in (2.08 m)
- Listed weight: 265 lb (120 kg)

Career information
- High school: Kennedy (Sacramento, California); Kent School (Kent, Connecticut); St. Thomas More School (Oakdale, Connecticut)
- College: California (1999–2001); Virginia (2002–2003); Concordia-Irvine (2003–2004)
- NBA draft: 2004: undrafted
- Playing career: 2004–2007
- Position: Center
- Coaching career: 2010–2011

Career history

Playing
- 2004: Utah Snowbears
- 2005: Long Beach Jam
- 2005: Idaho Stampede
- 2006–2007: Butte Daredevils
- 2007: Los Angeles D-Fenders
- 2007: Ricoh Manresa

Coaching
- 2010–2011: Concordia-Irvine (asst.)

Career highlights
- LEB Gold champion (2007); All-CBA Second Team (2007); CBA rebounding leader (2007); CBA All-Star (2007); First-team NAIA All-American (2004); GSAC Player of the Year (2004); First-team All-GSAC (2004)

Nicholas James VanderLaan (born October 27, 1979) is an American former professional basketball player. He played three seasons of Division I college basketball for California and Virginia before completing his college career at Concordia-Irvine in 2004. As a senior in 2003–04, he was named an NAIA All-American First Team honoree. He played professionally for three seasons, spending time in the American Basketball Association (ABA), Continental Basketball Association (CBA), NBA Development League and in the Spanish second-tier league (LEB). His best season came in 2007, when he led the CBA in rebounding and helped Ricoh Manresa win the LEB championship.

== High school career ==
Born in Long Beach, California, VanderLaan first attended high school in his hometown of Sacramento before completing his secondary education in Connecticut. Following his sophomore year at Kennedy High School in 1997, VanderLaan moved to Kent, Connecticut, for his junior year. As a junior at Kent School in 1997–98, he was named the MVP of the school's basketball team after averaging 26 points and 15 rebounds per game. During the season, he had a quadruple-double with 48 points, 22 rebounds, 11 blocks and 10 assists in a 101–97 double-overtime victory.

On November 17, 1998, VanderLaan signed a National Letter of Intent to play college basketball for the University of California, Berkeley.

As a senior at Oakdale's St. Thomas More School in 1998–99, VanderLaan averaged 19 points and 14 rebounds per game. He was named co-MVP of a team that finished with a 28–4 overall record and a second-place finish in the Class A New England Prep School tournament.

In high school, VanderLaan also played American football as a tight end and defensive end.

== College career ==
=== California (1999–2001) ===
As a freshman at California in 1999–2000, VanderLaan played in 33 games and had 16 starting assignments. He averaged 8.5 points and 6.7 rebounds per game, becoming only the fourth Cal freshman to have at least 200 rebounds. He was Cal's leading rebounder in 15 of the team's final 23 games, and finished the season second on the team in rebounding. He earned All-Tournament honors at the Top of the World Classic in Alaska after making his collegiate debut with a 20-point performance against Texas Christian, and scoring a career-high 23 points two games later in the title game against Oklahoma. At the season's end, he was named an honorable mention for the Pac-10 All-Freshman team.

As a sophomore in 2000–01, VanderLaan played in 29 of Cal's 31 games and had 21 starting assignments. He averaged 6.2 points and 5.3 rebounds per game, finishing as Cal's second-leading rebounder for the second consecutive season. On December 21, 2000, VanderLaan recorded his only double-double of the season with 14 points and 12 rebounds in an 85–64 win over Georgia. VanderLaan started 21-straight games for Cal in 2000–01, but lost his starting job to Solomon Hughes in the final three weeks of Pac-10 play after he missed two games in February with a sprained right ankle.

In March 2001, VanderLaan decided to transfer to another school for his junior year, citing personal reasons.

=== Virginia (2001–2003) ===
In May 2001, VanderLaan transferred to the University of Virginia. He was forced to sit out the 2001–02 season due to NCAA transfer regulations, but was able to practice with the team.

As a redshirted junior in 2002–03, VanderLaan averaged 5.3 points and 4.5 rebounds in 31 games for the Cavaliers. He again finished second on the team in rebounding. He shot 50.8 percent (64-of-126) from the field, scored in double figures five times, and started in 14 games. On December 19, 2002, he scored a season-high 17 points against Gardner–Webb. Two days later, he had a season-high 11 rebounds against Rutgers.

=== Concordia-Irvine (2003–2004) ===
In August 2003, VanderLaan transferred from Virginia to Concordia University Irvine, moving again because of limited playing time with the Cavaliers in 2002–03. With one year of eligibility remaining, he had to play in a program that was not NCAA Division I. As a senior playing for the Eagles in 2003–04, he was named to the All-GSAC Team and received GSAC Player of the Year honors. He was also named an NAIA All-American First Team honoree and earned NAIA All-Tournament Team honors. On February 9, 2004, he was named GSAC Player of the Week after leading the Eagles to two wins with averages of 21.5 points and 11.5 rebounds. VanderLaan helped lead Concordia-Irvine to the final of the 2004 NAIA Tournament, where they were defeated 74–70 by Mountain State University despite an 18-point, 11-rebound effort from VanderLaan. He played and started in all 38 games for the Eagles in 2003–04, averaging team highs in points (16.1) and rebounds (11.6), while also averaging 1.2 assists, 1.0 blocks and 0.9 steals per game. He set a new single-season and school record with 29 double-doubles.

=== College statistics ===
Year	Team	GP	GS	MPG	FG%	3P%	FT%	RPG	APG	SPG	BPG	PPG
1999–2000	California	33	16	22.8	.452	.000	.634	6.7	.6	.8	.2	8.5
2000–01	California	29	21	20.1	.467	.000	.539	5.3	.7	.6	.2	6.2
2002–03	Virginia	31	14	15.3	.508	.000	.545	4.5	.7	.4	.6	5.3
2003–04	Concordia-Irvine	38	38	26.4	.547	.333	.626	11.6	1.2	.9	1.0	16.1

== Professional career ==
=== Golden State Warriors (2004) ===
After going undrafted in the 2004 NBA draft, VanderLaan joined the Golden State Warriors in July 2004 for the Southern California Summer Pro League. He appeared in four out of six games for the Warriors during the tournament, with his best performance coming in the team's final game, where he recorded 10 points and eight rebounds in 21 minutes off the bench.

=== ABA (2004–2005) ===
VanderLaan joined the newly established Utah Snowbears for their inaugural season in the American Basketball Association (ABA). He played in the team's first two games of the season (November 19–20) before being placed on the injured list on November 24 and replaced on the active roster by former NBA player Tony Farmer.

In January 2005, VanderLaan was tested by Polish team Anwil Włocławek. He did not play for Włocławek during his stint with the team, and upon returning to the United States, he joined the ABA's Long Beach Jam. He made his debut for the Jam on January 28, recording two points, four rebounds and one block in a 139–114 win over Tijuana. He played out the season with the Jam and helped them finish with a 20–11 overall record, after they went 18–10 in the regular season and 2–1 in the post-season. Their final game came on March 9, where despite a double-digit scoring effort from VanderLaan, the Jam were defeated 130–115 by his former team, the Utah Snowbears.

=== Idaho Stampede (2005) ===
On November 6, 2005, VanderLaan signed with the Idaho Stampede of the Continental Basketball Association (CBA). He recorded six points and 10 rebounds over the Stampede's first three games of the season before being waived on November 22.

=== Butte Daredevils (2006–2007) ===
On November 2, 2006, VanderLaan returned to the CBA, signing with the Butte Daredevils for the 2006–07 season. On January 23, 2007, he was named CBA Player of the Week for the week of January 16–22. He averaged 11 points and 16 rebounds in three games during the week, highlighted by a league-high 25-rebound performance. Later that month, he was named in the National Conference All-Star team for the 23rd Annual CBA All-Star Classic. In the All-Star Game on February 6, VanderLaan grabbed a game-high 16 rebounds and helped the National Conference defeat the American Conference 134–131 in overtime. In the Daredevils' season finale on March 25, VanderLaan had a double-double with 13 points and a game-high 17 rebounds in a 110–103 win over the Great Falls Explorers. The Daredevils finished their first season in the CBA with a 21–27 record, good for third place in the National Conference. VanderLaan appeared in 47 of the team's 48 games in 2006–07, making 43 starts and averaging 13.0 points, a league-leading 11.7 rebounds, and 1.3 assists in 31.1 minutes per game. He also shot 53.8% from the field and 69.3% from the free throw line. VanderLaan subsequently earned All-CBA Second Team honors.

=== Los Angeles D-Fenders (2007) ===
On April 3, 2007, VanderLaan was acquired by the Los Angeles D-Fenders of the NBA Development League. He made his debut for the D-Fenders that night, recording 10 points, eight rebounds, six assists, one steal and one block in 25 minutes off the bench in a 121–104 win over the Albuquerque Thunderbirds. In their season finale on April 14, he recorded 15 points and a D-Fenders season-high 19 rebounds in a 90–83 loss to the Idaho Stampede. The D-Fenders missed the playoffs in 2006–07 with a 23–27 record. In five games, VanderLaan averaged 12.6 points, 12.4 rebounds and 1.4 assists in 31 minutes per game.

=== Ricoh Manresa (2007) ===
On April 30, 2007, VanderLaan signed with Spanish team Ricoh Manresa for their LEB playoff run. He helped Manresa go undefeated (7–0) in the playoffs, as they made it through to the final where they defeated Climalia León 94–88 to claim the LEB championship. VanderLaan appeared in all seven playoff games for Manresa, averaging 3.9 points and 2.7 rebounds in 8.0 minutes per game.

=== New Jersey Nets (2007) ===
On July 3, 2007, VanderLaan was named in a 14-man New Jersey Nets roster for the Orlando Pro Summer League. He did not make an appearance for the Nets as part of the final 12-man squad.

== Coaching career ==
VanderLaan was an assistant coach for the Concordia University Irvine men's basketball team during the 2010–11 season.
