= North Dakota State Fair =

Annual event in North Dakota, United States

Coordinates: 48°13′59″N 101°15′39″W

- Genre: State fair
- Locations: Minot, North Dakota
- Country: United States
- Years active: 1922–1941; 1946–2010; 2012–2019; 2021–; state sanctioned 1966 (excluding 1942–1945, 2011, 2020)
- Attendance: 310,000 (2012), 320,486 (2013)
- Website: North Dakota State Fair

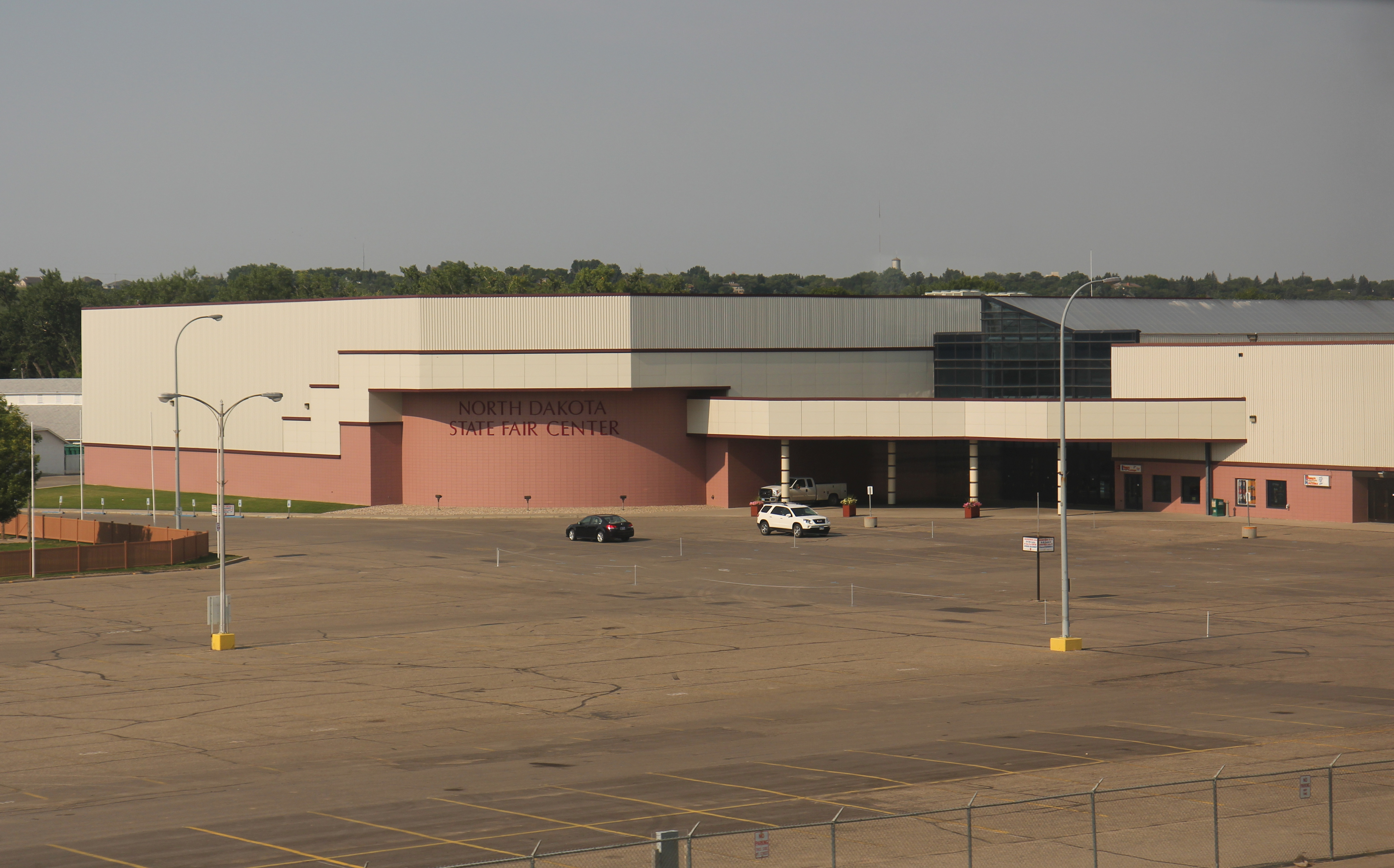
All Seasons Arena

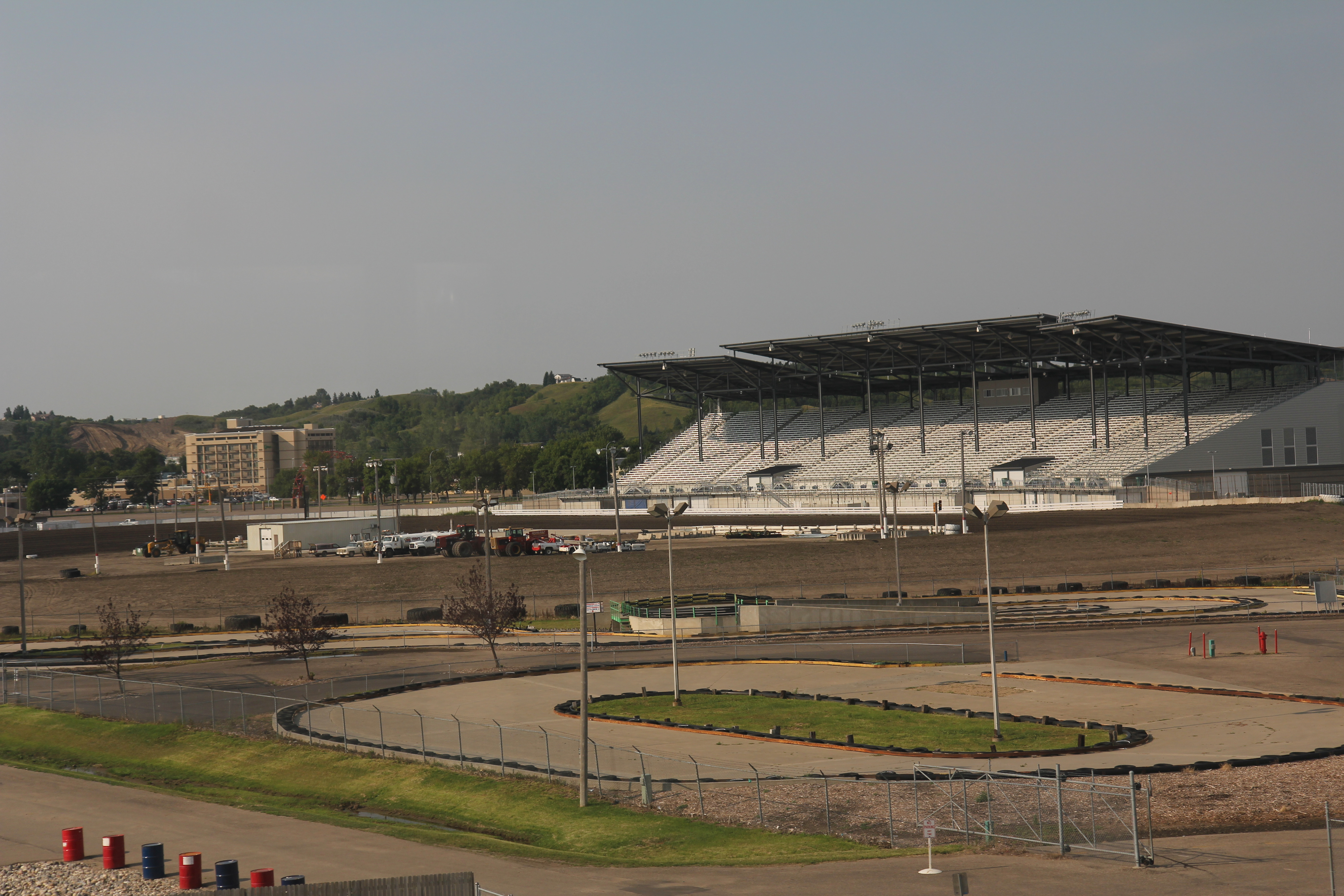
Nodak Speedway

The North Dakota State Fair is an annual state fair held each July in Minot, North Dakota, USA. The fair has carnival rides, agricultural expositions, government and commercial exhibitions, and a variety of musical and performance entertainment.

The fairgrounds are located along Burdick Expressway in east Minot. The facilities on the site are used for a variety of other events; the grandstand is regularly used for Nodak Speedway stock car races, and the All Seasons Arena is frequently used for conventions, sporting events and festivals, including Norsk Høstfest.

The fair was first held in Minot in 1922 but was not officially sanctioned by the state government until 1966. The North Dakota State Fair is the largest event in the state, drawing over 300,000 people each year, up from around 250,000 in 2006. Fair attendance tends to increase year by year, with two noted exceptions in 2011 and 2020. The 2011 fair was cancelled because of the 2011 Souris River flood a month prior, which left much of the grounds underwater. This announcement came after originally planning to hold the fair without competitive events. The 2020 fair was cancelled due to the COVID-19 pandemic, although attendance returned to over normal levels by the following year.

Security guards, the Minot Police and North Dakota Highway Patrol are the fair's patrollers.
