= Butte Civic Center =

Multi-purpose arena in Butte, Montana

Coordinates: 46°0′6.40″N 112°31′9.39″W

- Interactive map of Butte Civic Center
- Location: 1340 Harrison Avenue; Butte, Montana; United States
- Owner: Butte-Silver Bow
- Operator: Butte-Silver Bow
- Capacity: Basketball: 6,250; Hockey:5,100; Boxing:7,000
- Surface: Multi-Surface

Construction
- Opened: 1952; 74 years ago
- Cost: Unknown

Tenants
- Butte Copper Kings (SWHL) (1975–1976); Butte Daredevils (CBA) (2006–2008)

The Butte Civic Center is a 7,500-seat multi-purpose arena in Butte, Montana, USA. Opened in 1952, it hosts locals sporting events and concerts as well as political events. It was the home of the Continental Basketball Association's Butte Daredevils, who played there from their founding in 2006 until they folded in 2008. In December 2007 it played host to the funeral of local hero Evel Knievel.

The arena holds;

- Basketball: 6,250
- Hockey/Ice Events: 5,100
- Boxing: 7,000
