= Daryan Selvy =

American basketball player

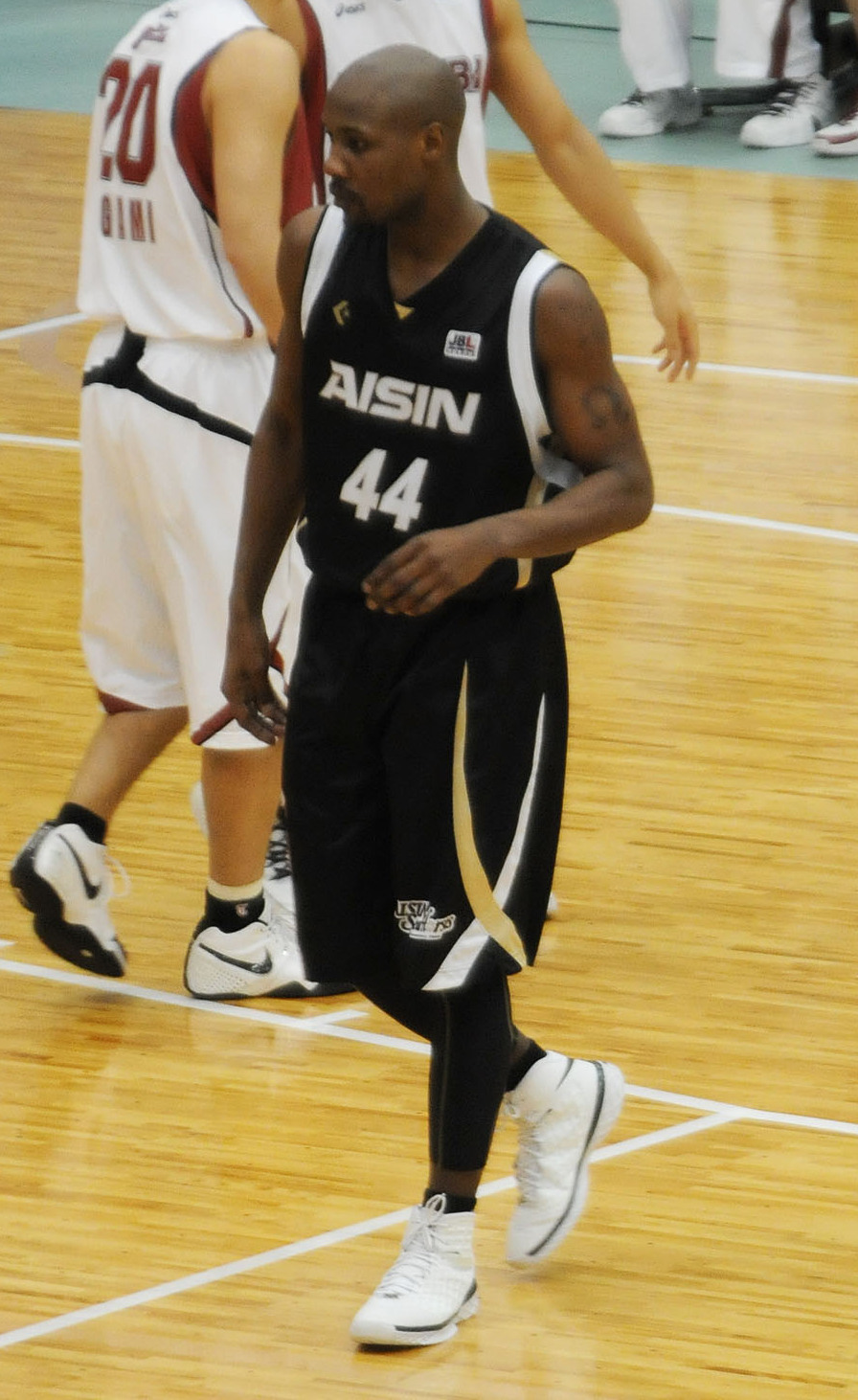
- Selvy with SeaHorses Mikawa in 2008

Personal information
- Born: January 26, 1979 (age 47) Memphis, Tennessee, U.S.
- Listed height: 6 ft 6 in (1.98 m)
- Listed weight: 215 lb (98 kg)

Career information
- High school: West Memphis (West Memphis, Arkansas)
- College: Carl Albert State (1998–2000); Oklahoma (2000–2002)
- NBA draft: 2002: undrafted
- Playing career: 2002–2010
- Position: Small forward / power forward

Career history
- 2002: Oklahoma Storm
- 2004: Bakken Bears
- 2006: Oklahoma Storm
- 2007–2008: Oklahoma Cavalry
- 2008–2010: SeaHorses Mikawa
- 2009: Barako Bull Energy Boosters

Career highlights
- JBL champion (2009); CBA champion (2008); CBA Player of the Year (2008); CBA All-Star (2008); All-CBA First Team (2008); Basketligaen champion (2004)

Daryan Cortas Selvy (born January 26, 1979) is an American former professional basketball player. He played college basketball for the Oklahoma Sooners. Selvy played professionally in the United States Basketball League (USBL), Continental Basketball Association (CBA), and overseas in Denmark, Japan and the Philippines. He was the CBA Player of the Year in 2008.

== Early life ==
Selvy was born in Memphis, Tennessee. He attended West Memphis High School in West Memphis, Arkansas. Selvy began his collegiate career with two seasons at Carl Albert State College before he transferred to play for the Oklahoma Sooners in 2000. He played as a reserve and averaged 6.8 points per game as a senior during the 2001–02 season.

== Professional career ==
Selvy was selected by the Oklahoma Storm in the 2002 United States Basketball League draft. He played in 16 games for the Storm during the 2002 season with an average of 7.4 points per game. Selvy joined the Bakken Bears of the Basketligaen midseason in 2004 and won the league championship. He returned to the Storm in 2006 for a single appearance.

Selvy played for the Oklahoma Cavalry of the Continental Basketball Association (CBA) during the 2007–08 season. He averaged 22.7 points per game and was chosen as the CBA Player of the Year. The Cavalry won the 2008 CBA championship.

Selvy played for SeaHorses Mikawa and won the Japan Basketball League championship in 2009. He then joined the Barako Bull Energy Boosters for the 2009 PBA Fiesta Conference.
