= Albuquerque Chaparrals =

- City: Albuquerque, New Mexico
- League: Southwest Hockey League
- Operated: 1975–1977
- Home arena: Tingley Coliseum

The Albuquerque Chaparrals were a senior amateur ice hockey team playing in Albuquerque, New Mexico. The Chaparrals were members of the Southwest Hockey League for its entire existence.

== History ==
When Ralph Engelstad founded the Southwest Hockey League in 1975, he was able to take advantage of the paucity of ice hockey teams in the region. After the dissolution of the Albuquerque Six-Guns in 1974, the Tingley Coliseum was available for a new tenant and agreed to be the home for the Chaparrals. Coached by Bob Gernander, the team finished second out of six in its first season. Unfortunately, Albuquerque was far less successful in its sophomore year and were in last place about two-thirds of the way through the year. In late January, the league was unable to continue due to a lack of funds and suspended play. All teams, including the Chaparrals, immediately ceased operation and never played again.
