= Gerald Bell =

Gerald Bell may refer to:

- Gerald Gordon Bell (1890–1970), Canadian flying ace
- Gerald Bell (American football) (born 1959), American football player

== See also ==
- Gerry Bell (disambiguation)
- Jerry Bell (disambiguation)
