= Jeremy Bell =

Jeremy Bell may refer to:

- Jeremy Bell, violinist for Penderecki String Quartet
- Jeremy Bell (producer), for Percy Jackson and the Olympians (TV series) etc.
- Jeremy Bell (basketball), played for Plymouth Raiders

== See also ==
- Jerry Bell (disambiguation)
