= Odell Bradley =

American basketball player (born 1981)

Personal information
- Born: September 6, 1981 (age 45) Nashville, Tennessee
- Listed height: 6 ft 4 in (1.93 m)
- Listed weight: 240 lb (109 kg)

Career information
- High school: Whites Creek (Nashville, Tennessee)
- College: IUPUI (2000–2004)
- NBA draft: 2004: undrafted
- Position: Forward

Career history
- 2004: Henan Dragons
- 2005–2006: Alaska Aces
- 2006–2008: Butte Daredevils
- 2008: Pittsburgh Xplosion

Career highlights
- CBA All-Star Game MVP (2008); All-CBA Second Team (2007); MCC Player of the Year (2004); First-team All-MCC (2004)

Odell Bradley (born September 6, 1981) is an American former professional basketball player. He was a forward in the United States Basketball League and the Continental Basketball Association.

== Early life ==
Bradley was born September 6, 1981, in Nashville, Tennessee. He played basketball at White Creek High School.

== College career ==
Bradley played at Indiana University-Purdue University Indianapolis for the IUPUI Jaguars. While there, he led his team to the NCAA tournament. In his last season there he averaged 23 points per game and 8 rebounds per game. While there, he won the Summit Player of the Year Award. He was named an honorable mention All-American by the Associated Press.

== Professional career ==
Bradley was drafted by the United States Basketball League for the Cedar Rapids River Raiders. He later played in the Continental Basketball Association (CBA) where he led his team on scoring. Bradley was named to the All-CBA Second Team while playing for the Butte Daredevils in 2007 and was the CBA All-Star Game MVP in 2008. He also played for the American Basketball Association, where he made the All ABA Championship Finals Team.
