= Utah Eagles =

- League: CBA 2006-Jan. 23, 2007 (Announced ceasing of operations)
- Founded: 2006
- Folded: 2007
- History: Utah Eagles 2006–2007
- Arena: Lifetime Activities Center at Salt Lake Community College
- Capacity: 5,000
- Location: Taylorsville, Utah
- Team colors: Red, black, gold, white
- Head coach: Scott Fields
- Ownership: Apex Sportstainment, LLC
- Championships: 0

The Utah Eagles were a basketball team in the Continental Basketball Association (CBA). They played their games in Taylorsville, Utah, and although they started play in the 2006-2007 season, they folded mid-season.

== 2006–2007 season ==
The Utah Eagles were owned by Apex Sportstainment, who also owned the Great Falls Explorers and Butte Daredevils at the same time.

The Eagles played their home games at the Lifetime Activities Center on the Redwood Campus of Salt Lake Community College - the same gymnasium used for the NBA's annual Rocky Mountain Revue.

The team's roster featured a number of players with local ties, including Harold Arceneaux, a former Weber State player, Bryant Markson, a former University of Utah player and Mike Hall, a former BYU player. John Millsap, the younger brother of Utah Jazz player Paul Millsap, also played for the Eagles. The roster also included talented players from other regions of the country.

Utah won its first game, beating Minot SkyRockets 134–120 on December 2, 2006. It finished its first season with a 6–16 record.

On January 23, 2007, the CBA announced that the team would fold after their game against the Butte Daredevils the following day.

Although the CBA was able to reschedule the remaining opponents' games so that all franchises would finish a 48-game schedule, two games could not be rescheduled and were deemed forfeits by league mandate. Those two losses meant the Eagles finished with a 6–18 record.
