= Billings Blazers =

- City: Billings, Montana
- League: Southwest Hockey League
- Operated: 1975–1977
- Home arena: METRA

The Billings Blazers were a senior amateur ice hockey team playing in Billings, Montana. The Blazers were members of the Southwest Hockey League for its entire existence.

== History ==
The Southwest Hockey League was formed in 1975 as a vehicle to further professional ice hockey in the western United States. That same year, the METRA was completed and had not yet secured a permanent tenant. Ralph Engelstad took advantage of this new development and placed two of the inaugural franchises in Montana. The Billings Blazers played their first game that fall and were coached by former NHLer Jack Bownass. The team finished the year one game under .500 and were successful enough to remain in place for the following season. The second year began with the loss of their in-state rival but the travel situation was resolved by two teams being located in neighboring North Dakota. Now playing under Bob Campbell, the team wasn't nearly as good on the ice for their sophomore season, however, the team's record was far from their biggest problem. The newest team in North Dakota folded just 20 games into the season and the rest of the league was in dire financial trouble. The SWHL managed to continue on for a few more months but by late January the well had dried up. Billings played their final game on January 24, after which the league folded along with all five remaining teams.

Despite the failure of the league, ice hockey proved to be popular in Billings. The very next season the Western Hockey League arrived with the relocation of a brand new team, the Billings Bighorns.

== Season record ==
Note: GP = Games played, W = Wins, L = Losses, T = Ties, Pts = Points, GF = Goals for, GA = Goals against

| Season | GP | W | L | T | Pts | GF | GA | Finish | Playoffs |
|---|---|---|---|---|---|---|---|---|---|
| 1975–1976 | 70 | 33 | 34 | 3 | 69 | 306 | 313 | 4th | — |
| 1976–1977 | 53 | 20 | 33 | 0 | 40 | 238 | 282 | 4th | N/A |
