= Tucson Icemen =

Southwest Hockey League team (1976 to 1977)

- City: Tucson, Arizona
- League: Southwest Hockey League
- Operated: 1976–1977
- Home arena: Tucson Community Center

Franchise history
- 1975–1976: Butte Copper Kings
- 1976–1977: Tucson Icemen

Championships
- Regular season titles: 1976–1977

The Tucson Icemen were a minor professional ice hockey team in the Southwest Hockey League from 1976 to 1977. Of the Southwest League's teams, the Icemen were the most successful, winning 31 of 41 games played in the league.

== History ==
The team was founded as the Butte Copper Kings and played at the Butte Civic Center in Butte, Montana for the 1975–76 season.

== Former players ==
- Bob Ferguson
- Les Jackson
