= All Seasons Arena (Minot) =

Multipurpose venue in Minot, North Dakota

Coordinates: 48°14′09″N 101°15′46″W

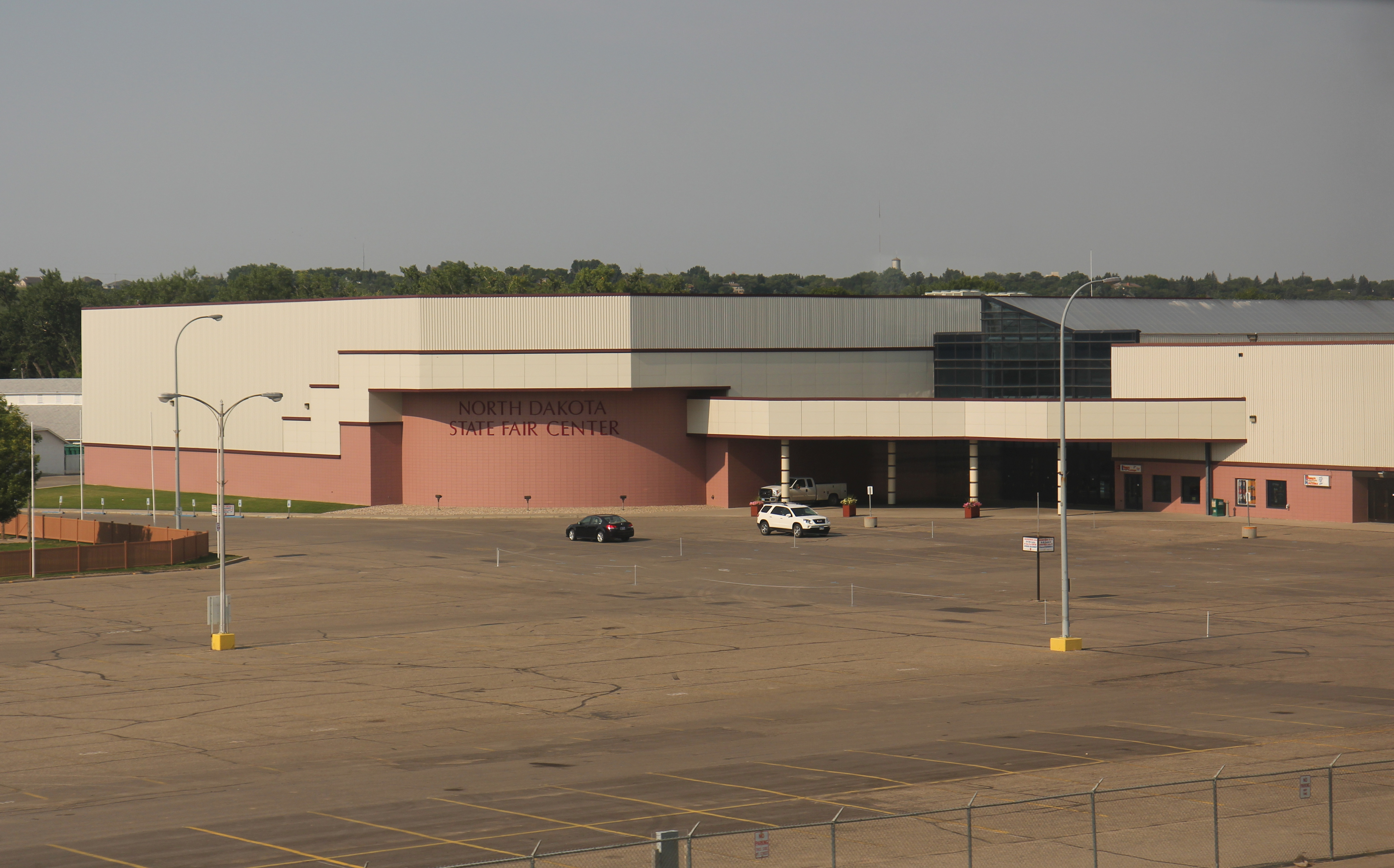
- circa 2013

- Location in the United States Location in North Dakota
- Interactive map of All Seasons Arena
- Location: Minot, North Dakota, U.S.
- Capacity: 3,900

All Seasons Arena is a multipurpose indoor venue in the north central United States, on the North Dakota State Fairgrounds in Minot, North Dakota. It has a seating capacity of 3,900.
