= Desmond Ferguson =

American basketball player and coach

Personal information
- Born: July 22, 1977 (age 49) Lansing, Michigan, U.S.
- Listed height: 6 ft 7 in (2.01 m)
- Listed weight: 203 lb (92 kg)

Career information
- High school: Everett (Lansing, Michigan)
- College: Missouri (1995–1996); Detroit Mercy (1997–2000)
- NBA draft: 2000: undrafted
- Playing career: 2000–2011
- Position: Small forward
- Number: 5

Career history
- 2001–2002: Flint Fuze
- 2002–2003: Great Lakes Storm
- 2004: Rockford Lightning
- 2004: Portland Trail Blazers
- 2005–2006: Idaho Stampede
- 2006–2007: Minot Skyrockets
- 2007–2008: Yakima Sun Kings

Career highlights
- CBA All-Star (2002); 2× All-CBA First Team (2007, 2008)
- Stats at NBA.com
- Stats at Basketball Reference

Desmond Ferguson (born July 22, 1977, in Lansing, Michigan) is an American former professional basketball player and coach. He last played with the Halifax Rainmen of the PBL. He attended and played college basketball for the Missouri Tigers as a freshman and his last three seasons with the Detroit Mercy Titans.

He was signed by the National Basketball Association's Portland Trail Blazers to a 10-day contract in March 2004, and appeared in seven games with them during the 2003–04 NBA season. He was later taken by the Charlotte Bobcats during the 2004 NBA expansion draft and was waived sometime before the season began. Ferguson only played in the NBA for two weeks, with his final game ever being on April 14, 2004, in a 105–104 loss to the Los Angeles Lakers. The game went to double overtime, but Ferguson only played for 3 1/2 minutes total and recorded 3 points.

Ferguson was a two-time All-Continental Basketball Association (CBA) First Team selection in 2007 and 2008.

Ferguson retired from playing in 2011, becoming a high school coach at his alma mater, Everett High School in Lansing. He left that post in 2017 to focus on his business interests.
