= Amarillo Wranglers (1975–1977) =

- City: Amarillo, Texas
- League: Southwest Hockey League
- Operated: 1975–1977
- Home arena: Amarillo Civic Center
- Colors: Orange, Blue and White

Amarillo Wranglers Hockey Team 1976

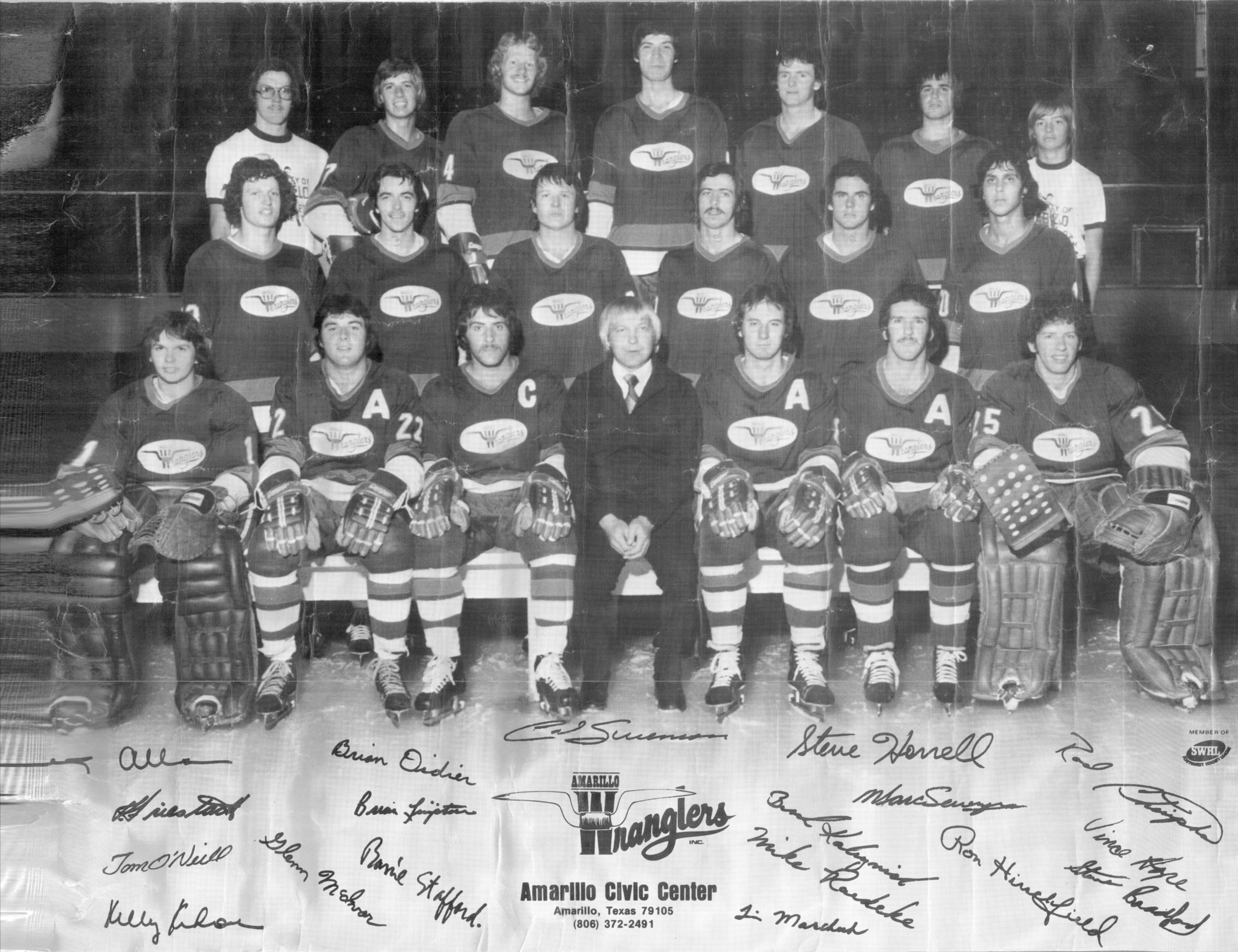
Amarillo Wranglers Hockey Team 1975

The Amarillo Wranglers were a minor professional ice hockey team in the Southwest Hockey League from 1975 to 1977. This was the second Wranglers ice hockey team established in Amarillo, Texas; the first being the Pittsburgh Penguins farm team described in a separate entry.

The Wranglers were established by Las Vegas businessman Ralph Engelstad, founder of the Southwest Hockey League. The league model was unique in that it promoted the educational development of its players. Players received a stipend of $60.00 per month, were provided with room and board, and were provided with tuition and fees to a local university or junior college. Players not drafted by higher leagues could complete their education.

The Wranglers wore orange, blue, and white jerseys modeled after the New York Islanders.

The Amarillo Wranglers were Southwest League Champions for the 1975-1976 season under Coach Cal Swenson.

The Wranglers underwent reorganization and briefly played as the Amarillo Lone Stars beginning in December 1976. The Southwest Hockey League folded in January 1977.

In March 2013, the Wranglers held their 36th reunion in Amarillo, TX. At the NAHL Amarillo Bulls final home game in 2013, the Wranglers were heralded as the city’s first hockey champions. A banner is now on display in the Amarillo Civic Center commemorating the Wranglers’ championship season.

President - Bill O’Grady

Coach - Cal Swenson

== Season record ==
Note: GP = Games played, W = Wins, L = Losses, T = Ties, Pts = Points, GF = Goals for, GA = Goals against

Southwest Hockey League

Season	GP	W	L	T	Pts	GF	GA	Finish	Playoffs
1975–1976	72	40	30	2	82	320	290	1st	1st
1976–1977	44	26	18	0	52	218	187	2nd	N/A

== Amarillo Wranglers all-time roster ==
Name; Position; Years played

- Doug Allan; Goaltender; 1975–77
- Gerry Bell; Forward; 1976–77
- Steve Blue; Forward; 1976–77
- Steve Bradford; Forward; 1975–77
- Rod Chiupka; Forward; 1975–76
- Brian Didier; Defense; 1975–76
- Rick Dormanl; Forward; 1976–77
- Blaine Fennell; Defense; 1976–77
- Rick Finlayson; Forward; 1975–76
- Peter Friestadt; Goaltender; 1975–77
- Kirk Fyffe; Forward; 1975–77
- Bill Hall;Defense; 1976–77
- Don Hansford; Defense; 1976–77
- Ken Harrison; Forward; 1976–77
- Ron Hirschfield; Forward; 1975–77
- Vince Hope; Defense; 1975–77
- Bob Johnson; Forward; 1976–77
- Brock Kaluznick; Forward; 1975–77
- Kelly Kehoe; Forward; 1975–77
- Brian Livingston; Defense; 1975–76

Name; Position; Years played

- Tim Marchuk; Defense; 1975–77
- Brent McCracken; Forward; 1975–76
- Glenn McIvor; Defense; 1975–77
- Monte Miron; Defense; 1975–76
- Tom O’Neill; Defense; 1975–76
- Paul Peters; Forward; 1975–76
- Vern Quaroni; Forward; 1975–77
- Mike Raedeke;Forward; 1975–76
- Brian Rozanski; Forward; 1976–77
- John Severyn; Defense; 1976–77
- Marc Severyn; Forward; 1975–77
- Pat Severyn; Forward; 1975–77
- Bret Shepard; Forward; 1976–77
- Rex Shepard; Defense; 1976–77
- Barrie Stafford; Forward; 1975–77
- Andy Stewart; Goaltender; 1976–77
- George Thompson; Defense; 1976–77
- Ross Weseen; Forward; 1975–76
- Scott Williams; Forward; 1976–77
