= Southwest Hockey League =

American ice hockey league

The Southwest Hockey League was a senior ice hockey league that operated in the Southwestern United States from 1975 to 1977. The Southwest Hockey League (SWHL) was established in 1975 to train players for professional leagues.

Ralph Engelstad, a former University of North Dakota Fighting Sioux hockey goaltender, Las Vegas casino owner, construction magnate, and entrepreneur, conceived and financed the SWHL in the early 1970s, along with his younger brother, Richard. Six cities awarded teams were: Albuquerque, New Mexico; Amarillo, Texas; Billings, Montana; Butte, Montana; El Paso, Texas; and Reno, Nevada.

The purpose of SWHL was to provide a development circuit for young American and Canadian players interested in attending college and playing hockey. It was modeled after a similar system employed by the Canadian National Hockey Team. Teams were responsible for each player's room and board, tuition for a local college or university, and a monthly 60 dollar stipend. SWHL Commissioner and Vice-President Winston "Bing" Juckes, a former professional hockey player, ran tryout camps in August 1975. he SWHL received more than 1,600 player applications. 350 attended the try-out camps. 130 players were invited to Final Camp in White Rock, British Columbia, held from August 25 to September 6, 1975. The players stayed at a summer camp resort facility in Blaine, Washington and were transported by bus back and forth from the arena in White Rock. 108 players were selected by the six teams.

In the end, the SWHL was not financially viable, and was disbanded in January 1977 with 30 games left in the season.

== Teams ==
- Amarillo Wranglers / Lone Stars (1975–1977)
- Albuquerque Chaparrals (1975–1977)
- Butte Copper Kings (1975–1976)
- Billings Blazers (1975–1977)
- Bismarck Capitols (1976–1977)
- Butte Copper Kings (1975–1976)
- El Paso Raiders (1975–1976)
- Minot Raiders / Rangers (1976–1977)
- Reno Broncos (1975)
- Tucson Icemen (1976–1977)

== Champions ==
- 1975–76 : Amarillo Wranglers
- 1976–77 : Tucson Icemen
