= Butte Daredevils =

- League: CBA
- Founded: 2006
- Folded: 2008
- History: Butte Daredevils; 2006–2008
- Arena: Butte Civic Center
- Capacity: 6,250
- Location: Butte, Montana
- Team colors: Red, White, and Blue
- Head coach: Justin Wetzel, Pat O'Heron
- Ownership: Apex Sportstainment, LLC

The Butte Daredevils were a basketball team in the Continental Basketball Association (CBA) that played from 2006 to 2008. They played their home games at the Butte Civic Center in Butte, Montana. The franchise hosted the 2007 CBA All-Star Game.

== Team history ==
The Butte Daredevils were named in honor of Butte native Evel Knievel. Their logo, featuring a motorcycle helmet and patriotic flag, makes reference to him. The team was owned by Apex Sportstainment, who also owned the Utah Eagles and Great Falls Explorers in 2006.

In January 2008, it was announced that the franchise was in an undisclosed amount of debt due to low crowd figures and business sponsorships.

The team folded in August 2008 via a letter to the Montana Standard newspaper after months of speculation.

== Season by season record ==
Season	GP	W	L	Pct.	QW	Points	Finish	Playoffs
2006–07	48	21	27	.438	87	150	3rd CBA National Division	—

== See also ==
- Montana Golden Nuggets
- Billings Volcanos
