= Lester S. Willson =

Union soldier and Montana merchant

Lester Sebastion Willson
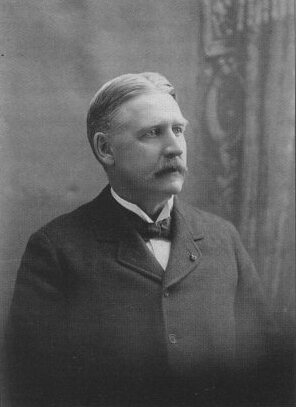
- Lester Sebastion Willson, c. 1898
- Born: Lester Sebastion Willson; June 16, 1839; Canton, New York, US
- Died: January 26, 1919 (aged 79); Bozeman, Montana, US
- Spouse: Emma D. Weeks
- Children: 3, including Fred
- Military career
- Branch: U.S. Army Volunteers
- Service years: 1861-1865
- Rank: Brevet Brigadier General
- Unit: 60th New York Volunteers
- Conflicts: American Civil War; Battle of Antietam; Battle of Chancellorsville (WIA); Battle of Wauhatchie; Battle of Lookout Mountain; Battle of Missionary Ridge; Peavine Creek; Battle of Ringgold Gap; Chattanooga campaign; Atlanta campaign; Savannah Campaign; Carolinas campaign
- Other work: merchant; state legislator

Lester Sebastion Willson (June 16, 1839 – January 26, 1919) was a U.S. Civil War officer in the Union Army, Assistant Quartermaster General of New York, and a Montana merchant and politician in Bozeman, Montana. He was married at Albany, New York, on March 2, 1869, to Miss Emma D. Weeks, a native of Vermont. He died in Bozeman, Montana, on January 26, 1919.

== Early years ==
Lester Willson was born in Canton, New York, on June 16, 1839, the son of Ambrose and Julia Willson. He was one of seven children and had at least two brothers, Davis and George. His brother Davis would play a prominent role in Lester's later career as a businessman in Montana. He attended public schools in Canton and graduated from a prominent Academy before working as a clerk for two years and then volunteering for the Union Army in 1861.

== Civil War experiences ==
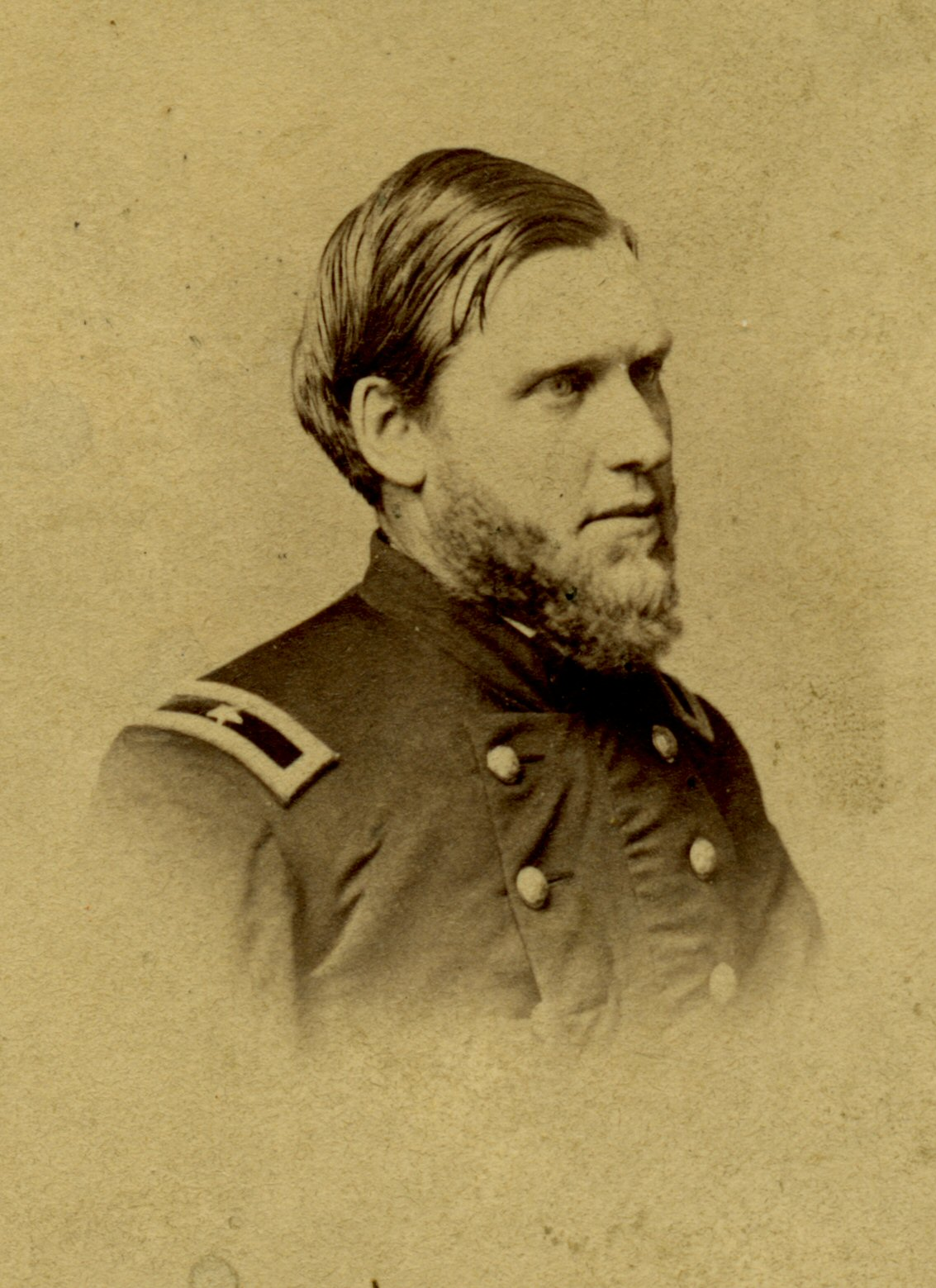
Willson in 1865

Willson enlisted in Company A, Sixtieth New York Volunteers, August, 1861, was enrolled second sergeant September 9, 1861, a lieutenant October 3, 1862, first lieutenant and adjutant November 17, 1862. He was offered a captaincy on the same day the adjutant's commission was received, but declined. He was made captain August 2, 1864, lieutenant-colonel October 1, 1864, and colonel May 17, 1865. Willson left the regiment July 17, 1865, as a colonel. On March 12, 1867, he was brevetted brigadier-general of volunteers "for gallant and meritorious services under General Sherman, resulting in the fall of Atlanta, Georgia."

=== Campaigns ===
During the winter of 1861-62, Willson participated in guarding the Baltimore and Ohio Railroad and campaigns in Virginia under generals Nathaniel Banks and John Pope. He fought at the Battle of Antietam, September 17, 1862. On May 5, 1863, he was severely wounded at the Battle of Chancellorsville Virginia. He did not return to duty until September 1863 under General Joseph Hooker when the XI and XII Corps of the Army of the Potomac moved westward to reinforce the Army of the Cumberland around Chattanooga, Tennessee. There Willson participated in the battles of Wauhatchie, Lookout Mountain, Missionary Ridge, Peavine Creek, and Ringgold Gap.

In 1864-65 he campaigned under General William Sherman and participated in the Chattanooga campaign, the Atlanta campaign, the Savannah Campaign and the Carolinas campaign.

As an aide, assistant inspector-general, and assistant adjutant-general, Willson was present at significant events during these campaigns. In Atlanta, his regiment, the 60th New York Volunteers share the honor of unfurling the union flag on top of the city hall with the 111th Pennsylvania Infantry. As assistant adjutant-general under the command of General John W. Geary he received the surrender of Savannah at the hands of its mayor R. D. Arnold, and was the first officer to enter the city at the head of his own regiment. The regiment entered the city unopposed and met the mayor and a delegation of the City Council instead of troops. Once Willson received the surrender his regiment quickly began providing protection to the citizens of Savannah from the mobs that had begun breaking into houses and plundering.

Throughout the war Willson enjoyed the confidence of his superiors and on more than one occasion he was entrusted with intricate and dangerous duties by General Sherman. Major General George S. Greene credited him with being a most faithful and intelligent officer, and of his regiment (60th New York Volunteers) Greene has said, "It was one of the best in the service."

=== New York State Militia ===
At the close of the war Willson held the rank of lieutenant colonel. His successful service and close association with many senior officers caused him to be appointed assistant quartermaster-general of the New York State Militia with the rank of colonel. For two years he was responsible for post-war dealings with the railroad companies regarding the transportation of troops, supplies, etc., the reconciliation of balances between the state and the general government, and the disposition of accumulated supplies belonging to the state.

Working alongside Lester was his cousin Charles Rich and army friend, Loren W. Tuller. In December, 1865 after hearing a presentation on the western U.S. by then Speaker of the House of Representatives, Schuyler Colfax, Lester Willson got the wanderlust. He convinced his co-workers to that they should go to Montana and start a mercantile business. Unfortunately, Lester could not leave his New York job unfinished and did not join Rich and Tuller until 1867. However, he did invest in the business enterprise and enlisted the participation of his younger brother Davis to join Rich and Tuller in the 1866 journey to Montana. After reaching Omaha, Nebraska, in May 1866, Davis Willson, Rich and Tuller invested over $5000 in supplies, merchandise and transportation to embark on an overland journey to Bozeman, Montana. Their journey took them west along the Platte River Road to Fort Laramie, Wyoming, and then northwest along the Bozeman Trail. They arrived safely in Bozeman on September 2, 1866, with little interference by hostile Indians along the Bozeman Trail. They operated a successful store out of a tent for two months and by the end of 1866, they had moved into a rented cabin on main street with a sign that read: "Tuller and Rich - Cheap Cash Store". Davis quickly established a corral attached to the cabin and named it "Empire Corral". The business flourished as they freighted supplies to the mining camps in Bannack and Virginia City, Montana.

By the spring of 1867, Lester Willson had found a prospective wife, Emma D. Weeks, and had finished his important postwar work for the New York State Militia. He resigned the office in March, 1867 to engage in business in Montana.

== Montana merchant ==
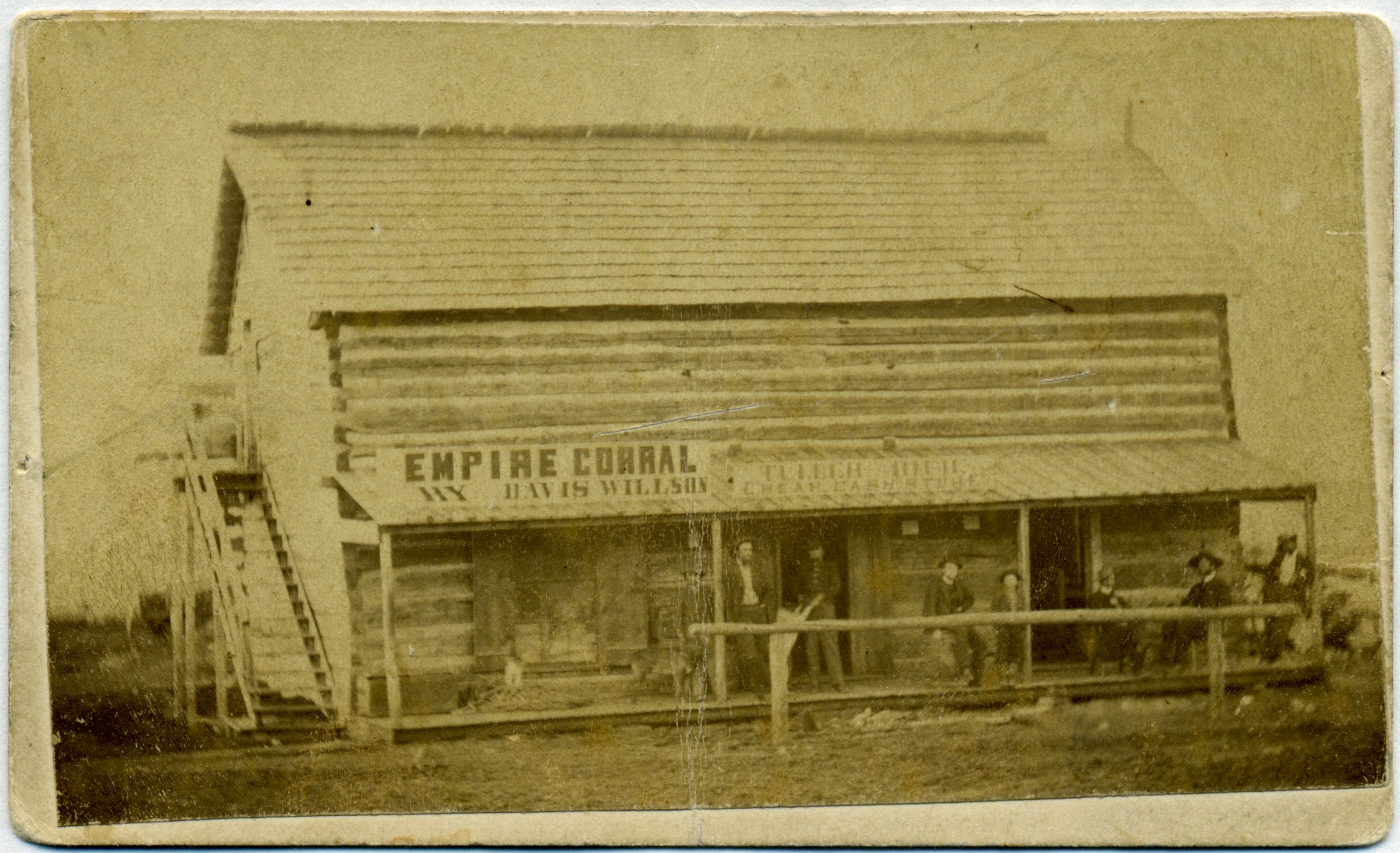
Tuller and Rich Store, Bozeman, 1866

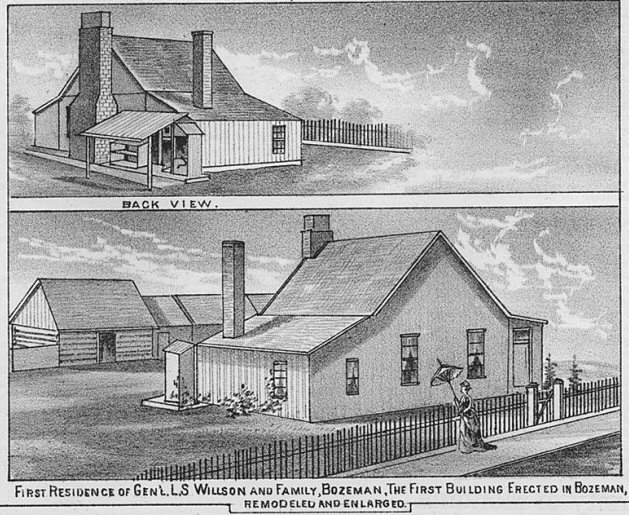
Lester and Emma Willson's 1st home in Bozeman, 1869

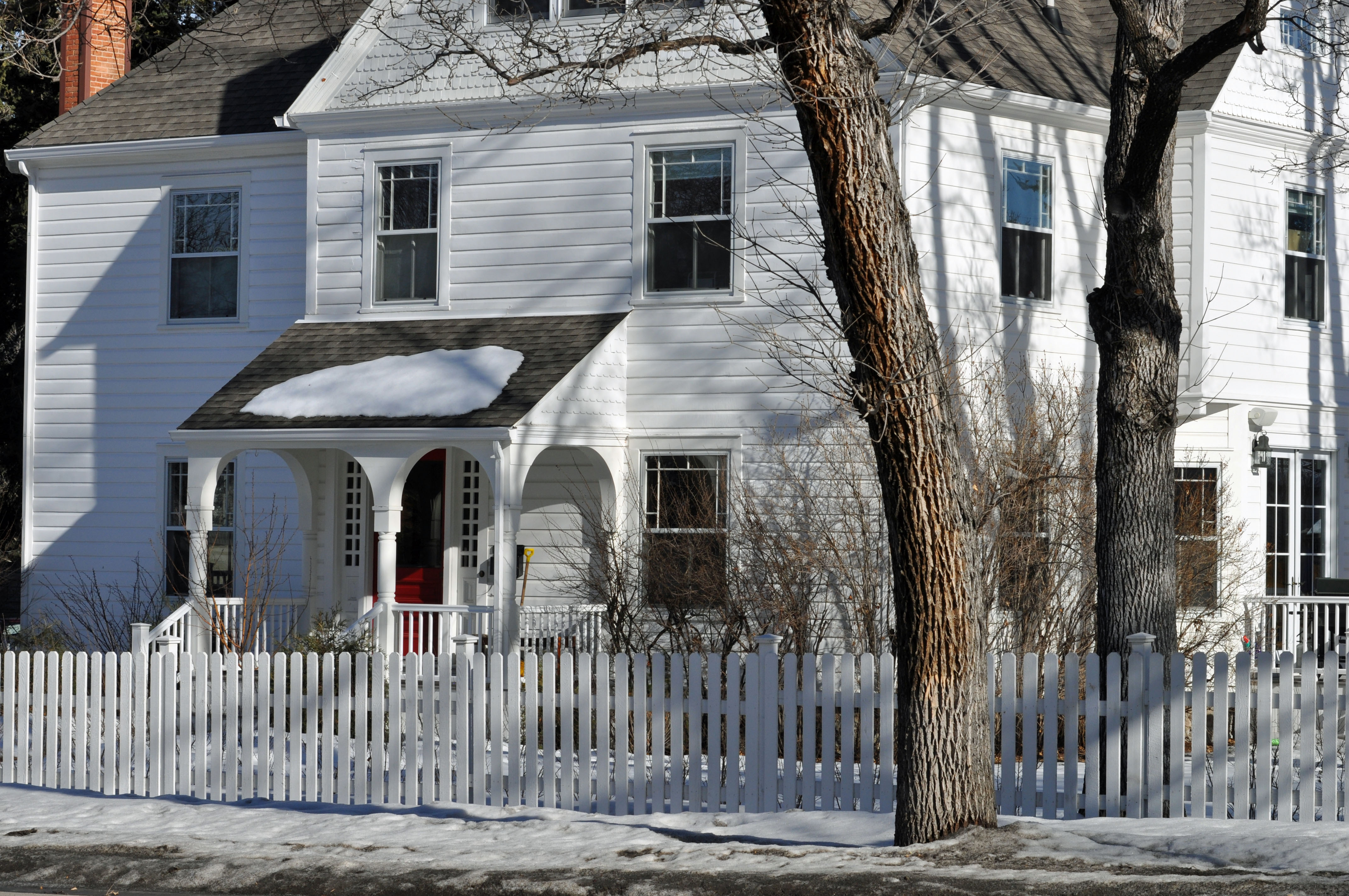
Willson House, built in 1886 by Lester Willson

Lester Willson left New York in April 1867 taking a much less arduous route to Bozeman. The Bozeman Trail was now closed because of Indian trouble so Lester traveled by Union Pacific passenger train from Chicago to Platte City, Missouri. From there, stagecoaches carried General Willson to Denver, Colorado, Salt Lake City, Utah, and on to Virginia City, Montana. He met with then Territorial Governor of Montana, Thomas F. Meagher in Virginia City and arrived in Bozeman on May 22, 1867. He became an active partner with his brother Davis, Rich and Tuller in running the mercantile business which was now flourishing because of the construction of Fort Ellis just west of town. In January, 1868 he returned to New York and proposed to Miss Emma D. Weeks. By May, he was back in Bozeman helping run the business. In January 1869, Willson returned to Albany, New York, to marry Miss Emma D. Weeks on March 2, 1869, and bring her back to Bozeman. Returning via a Missouri River steamboat to Fort Benton, Montana, Lester, Emma and her piano were back in Bozeman by mid-May 1869. They soon moved into a remodeled cabin originally built by Daniel E. Rouse in 1864 in what was at the time one of the finest residences in Bozeman. Tuller left the business in 1868 and Davis Willson in 1870 to rejoin for a short period in 1872. Davis Willson eventually became a Presbyterian minister in the 1880s and the pastor of a small Gallatin Valley church. Lester Willson sold "The Willson Company" in 1914 five years before his death in 1919.

In August 1870, Lester and Emma had the opportunity to entertain the civilian members of the Washburn–Langford–Doane Expedition for dinner in their home on the evening before they left Bozeman on their historic expedition to Yellowstone.

Willson was a board member on the first executive board of the Agricultural College of Montana when it was established in 1893.

In 1882, along with Nelson Story, J.E. Martin, Broox Martin, and Edwin Lewis, Willson helped capitalize one of the first banks in the county, the Gallatin Valley National Bank. The bank failed during the Panic of 1893 and never reopened.

== Montana politician ==
While serving in New York, Willson became active in the Union Party (Republican), politics which he brought with him to Montana. Shortly after arriving in Bozeman, Willson was instrumental in the establishment of a Bozeman chapter of the Union League, a quasi-ritualistic, patriotic society (Republican) in the hope that Montana politics would soon be dominated by Republicans. Willson soon became a Union Party elector for the 1867 federal elections. In September, 1868 he won a seat in the Montana Territorial Legislature representing Gallatin County, Montana.

Willson was a Mason and a member of Bozeman Lodge No. 18, A. F. & A. M. He was charter member of the William English Post No. 10, Grand Army of the Republic and was a department commander of Montana. Willson also belonged to the Military Order of the Loyal Legion of the United States in New York, and to the Republican Club of the city of New York. In 1883-86 he served as territorial quartermaster-general with the rank of brigadier-general.

== Legacy ==
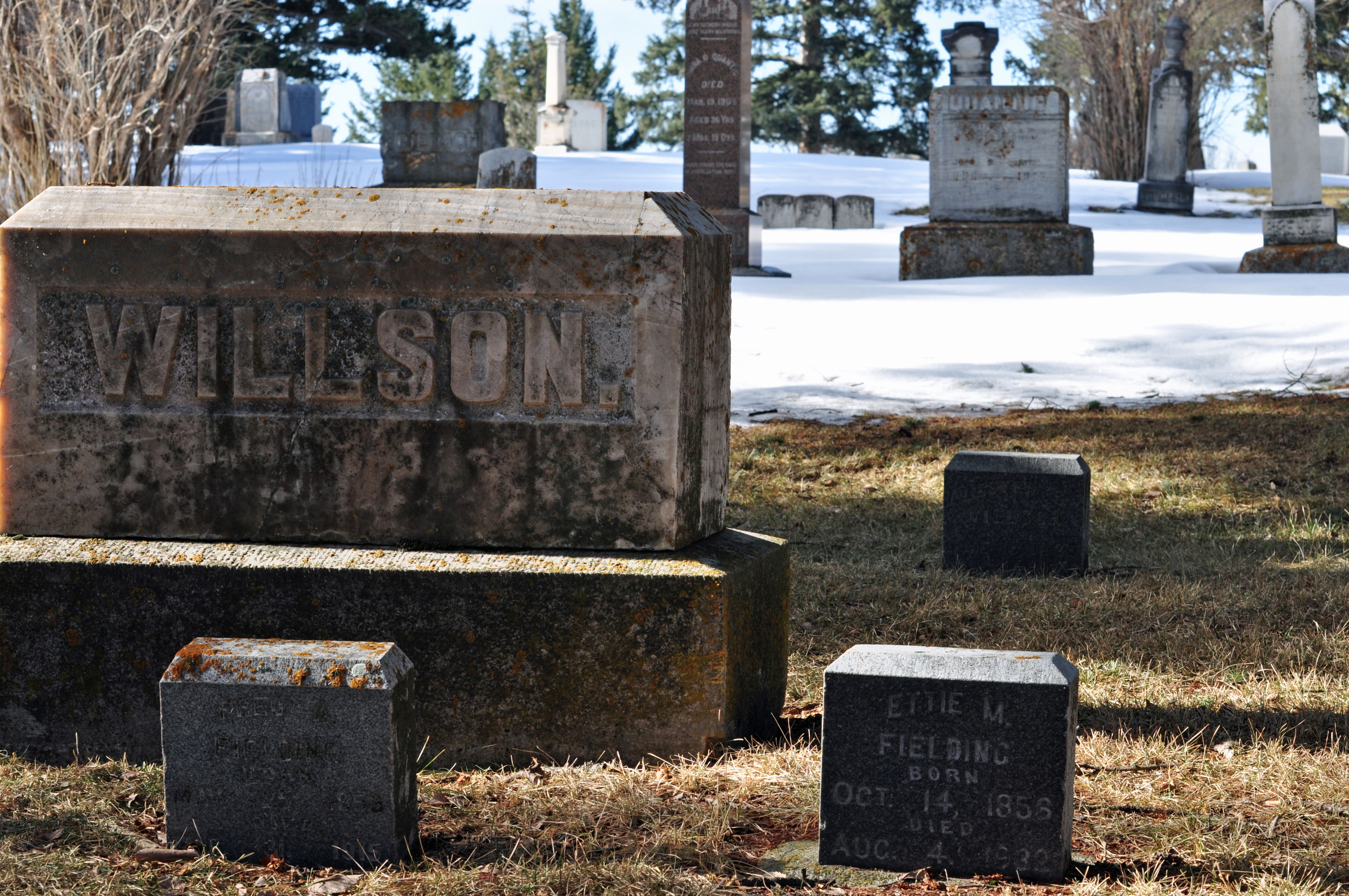
Willson family plot at Sunset Hills Cemetery. Lester S. Willson headstone is in the right rear.

In 1886 Lester and Emma built a home at 504 Central Avenue, just blocks from downtown. It still stands today on Willson Avenue, a major residential thoroughfare intersecting Bozeman's West Main Street. After his death, the city renamed Central Avenue to Willson Avenue.

Emma and Lester Willson had three children. Only one, Fred Fielding Willson survived to adulthood. Fred Willson became a prominent Bozeman architect and was responsible for a great many Bozeman buildings still standing today. He designed the Gallatin County High School, which was named Willson School in his honor when the building was converted from a high school to a middle school. The building now serves as the administrative hub for Bozeman Public Schools.

Lester Willson died on January 26, 1919.
