= Club Moderne =

- U.S. National Register of Historic Places
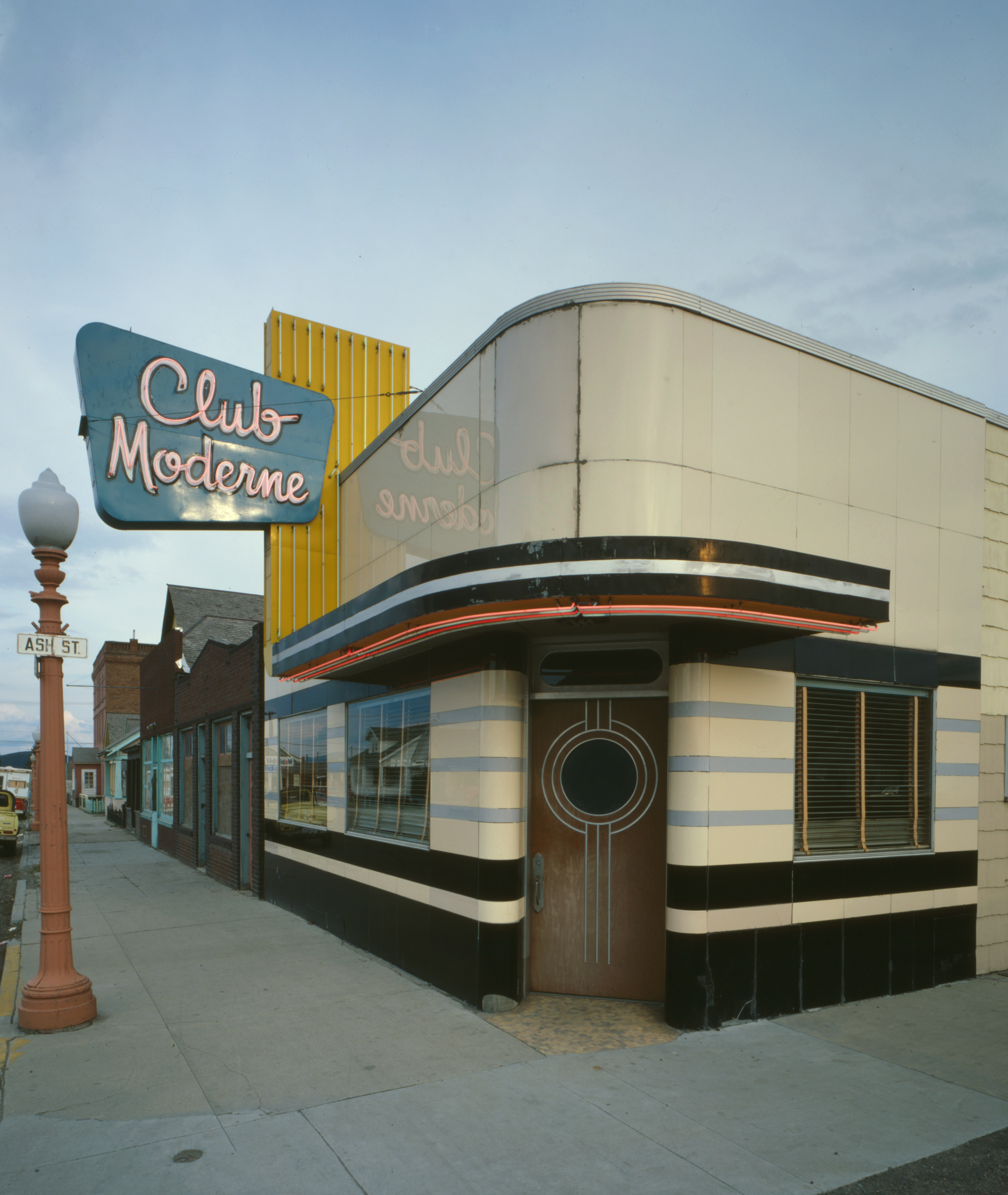

- Location within Montana Location within the United States
- Location: Anaconda, Montana
- Coordinates: 46°7′40″N 112°56′38″W
- Built: 1937
- Architect: Fred Willson, Frank Wullus
- Architectural style: Moderne
- NRHP reference No.: 86001498
- Added to NRHP: August 14, 1986

The Club Moderne is a bar in Anaconda, Montana, United States, in the Streamline Moderne style. It was designed by architect Fred F. Willson and built by Frank Wullus in 1937 for John Francisco. The facade was clad in Carrara glass. The interior was similarly custom-designed and remained in a high state of preservation, with appropriate renovations in 1948. Chosen as "America's Favorite Historic Bar" in 2016 in a contest sponsored by the National Trust for Historic Preservation, beating out another notable Montana venue, the Sip 'n Dip Lounge, The building was heavily damaged by fire on the evening of October 3, 2016. The current owner, who owned the bar since 1997, expressed an intent to rebuild. Following a soft reopening on April 28, 2017, the remodeled bar reopened to the public on May 13, 2017. The owners had to replace much of the interior and refurbish the exterior, but attempted to retain its traditional look and feel. The bar and a few original furnishings were preserved along with some of the original facade.
