= Belgrade City Hall and Jail =

US historic place in Belgrade, Montana

- U.S. National Register of Historic Places
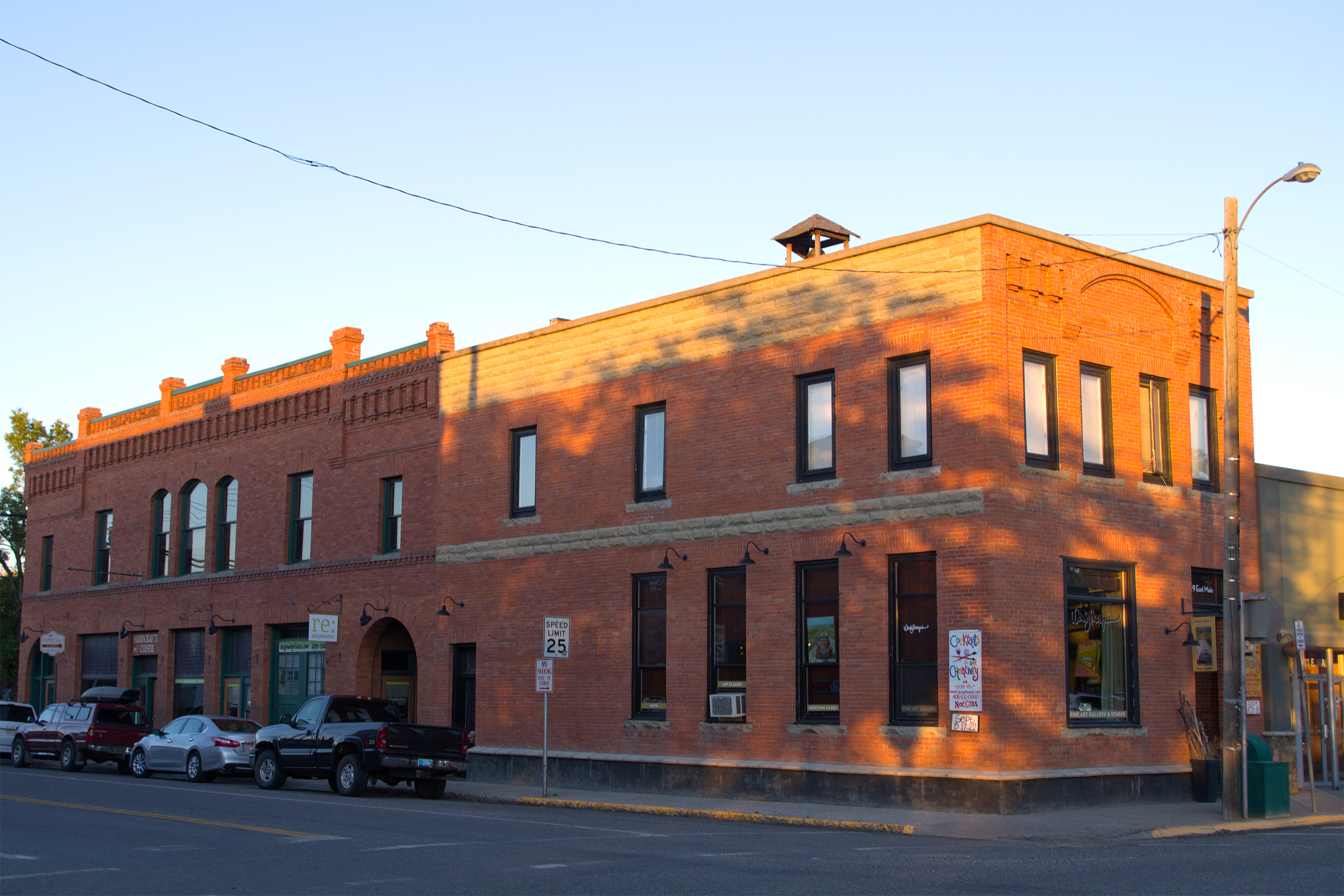
- City Hall and Jail building, at left, and another linked building on the corner (perhaps a 1902 bank building?)

- Location within Montana Location within the United States
- Location: Broadway at Northern Pacific Blvd., Belgrade, Montana
- Coordinates: 45°46′33″N 111°10′33″W
- Area: less than one acre
- Built: 1912
- Architect: Fred F. Willson
- Architectural style: Gothic
- NRHP reference No.: 82000592
- Added to NRHP: October 25, 1982

The Belgrade City Hall and Jail, on Broadway at Northern Pacific Blvd. in Belgrade, Montana, was built in 1912. It was listed on the National Register of Historic Places in 1982.

It was designed by Bozeman architect Fred F. Willson and was built in 1912. It is a two-story flat-roofed brick building with a parapet. Brick is laid in common bond with every seventh course being a header row. Sills on the front facade are made of cut sandstone from Columbus, Montana. Its style is characterized as "a late example of castellated Gothic rendered in the western vernacular. The major stylistic features are limited to the corbelled out brick along the cornice line and a stepped parapet of chimney-like features that break the skyline." Although it is rendered in brick, it is an implementation of the Western false front architecture usually rendered in wood, which used parapets and cornices to appear bigger, and which used more pretentious materials and workmanship on the street facade, with side and rear being much less adorned.

It has served as, or included, the city Hall, a police and fire station, a jail, a courthouse, a library, a post office, a theatre, and a community hall/basketball court. In 1981 it provided city offices and a senior citizens' headquarters on its first floor, and a community hall above. The community hall includes an auditorium with stage, dressing rooms, and a balcony.
