= Sacajawea Hotel =

- U.S. National Register of Historic Places
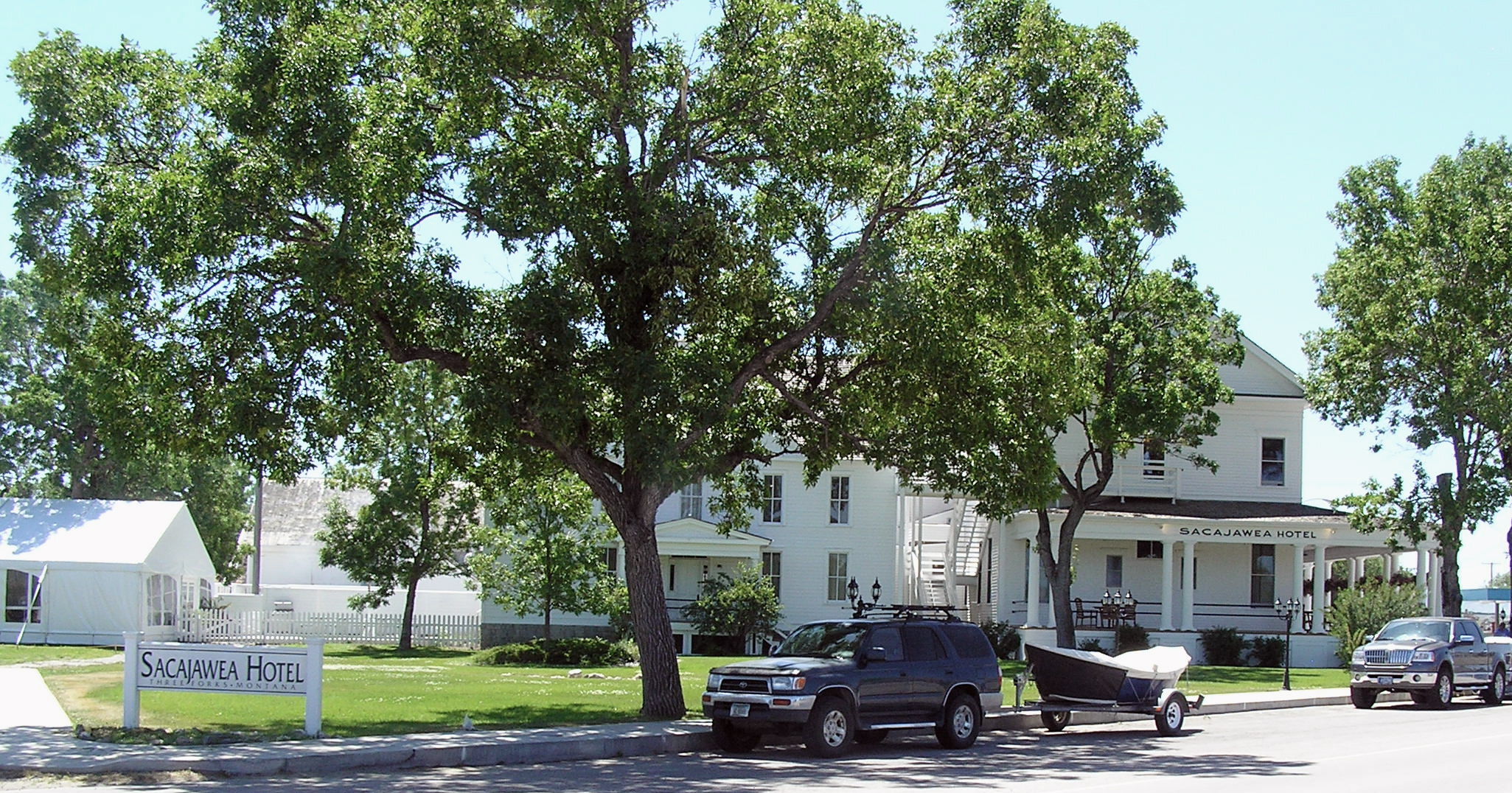
- Sacajawea Inn

- Location within Montana Location within the United States
- Location: 5 Main St., Three Forks, Montana
- Coordinates: 45°53′44″N 111°33′3″W
- Area: 1.8 acres (0.73 ha)
- Built: 1882
- Architect: Adams, John Q.; Wilson, Fred
- Architectural style: Colonial Revival
- NRHP reference No.: 80002418
- Added to NRHP: January 24, 1980

The Sacajawea Hotel, also known as Sacajawea Inn, is a hotel in Three Forks, Montana, United States. Built in 1910, it was listed on the National Register of Historic Places in 1980. The listing included three contributing buildings over a 1.8-acre (0.73 ha) area. Sacajawea Hotel is a member of Historic Hotels of America, the official program of the National Trust for Historic Preservation.

== History ==
The hotel served passengers on the Chicago, Milwaukee, St. Paul and Pacific Railroad, which terminated in Three Forks until 1927, when the line was extended to Gallatin Gateway. The original building was the Madison Hotel, built in 1862 on the original Three Forks townsite, and moved on log rollers a mile to its present location. At the time, the Milwaukee Depot was across the street, though the railroad That building now is the eastern portion of the current structure, housing support facilities. In 1910, the main lobby and 29 rooms were constructed by railroad agent John Q. Adams, who hired architect Fred Willson to create a grand but warm and welcoming design.

== Present day ==
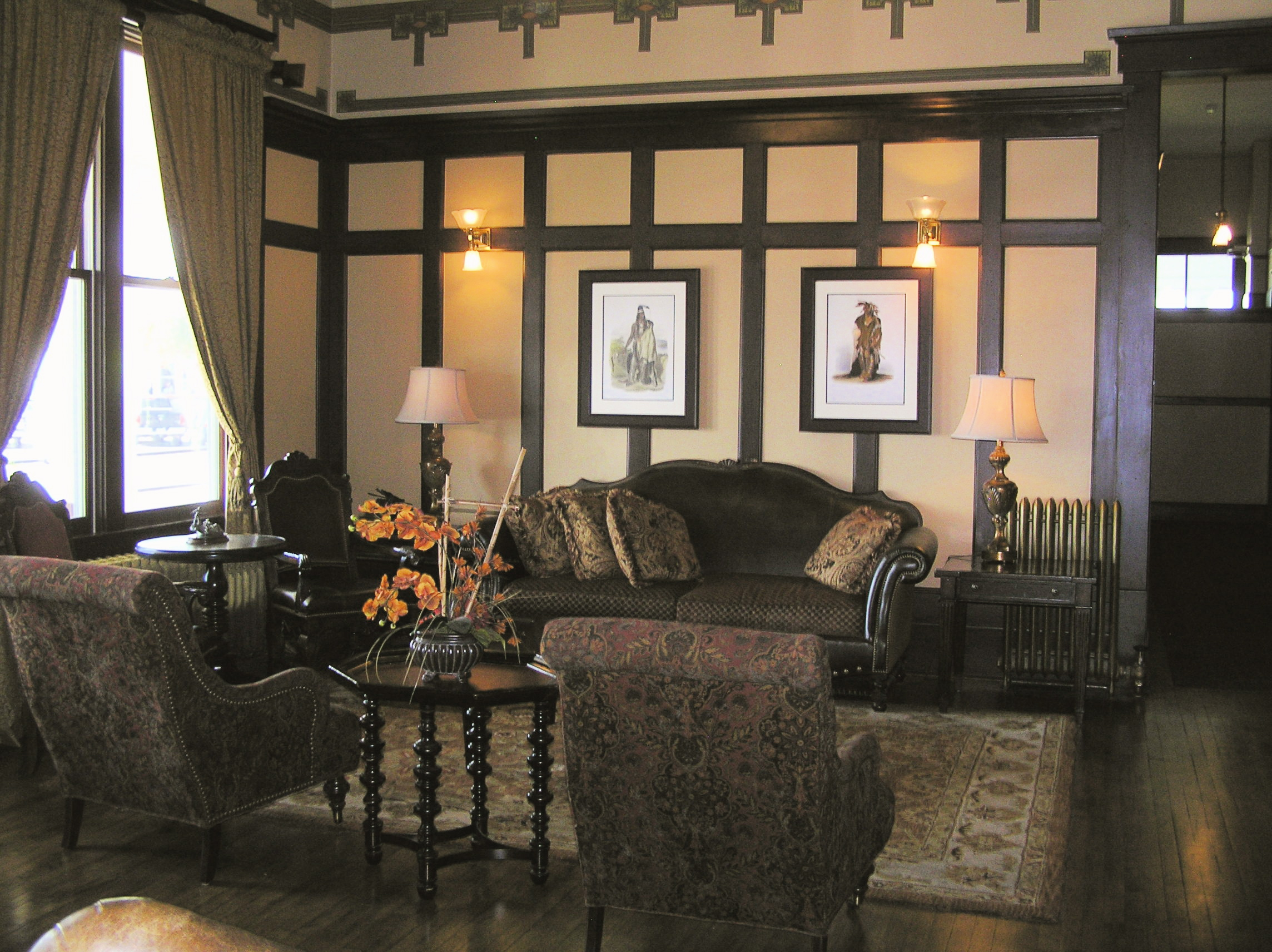
Lobby of the Sacajawea Hotel, 2012

The condition of the hotel had declined significantly by the 1990s. It was renovated with all new plumbing and electrical system, as well as new cedar roof by Smith and Jane Roedel, who owned the hotel from 1991 to 1997.

In 2002 it was put up for sale and was bought in 2009 by the Folkvord family, which owns the bread company Wheat Montana. The hotel was closed for seven months for renovation, was refurbished and reopened. The hotel now includes a bar in the basement, restaurant with bar and adjoining meeting room, and 29 hotel rooms. They also offer bicycles for use on a trail that was created from one of the abandoned railroad trails.
