= Eagle's Store =

United States historic place

- U.S. National Register of Historic Places
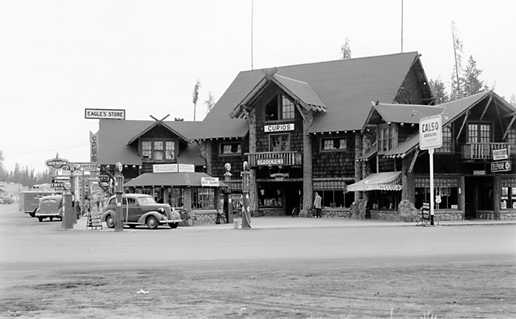
- Eagle's Store, August 24, 1939

- Location within Montana Location within the United States
- Location: 3 Canyon St., West Yellowstone, Montana
- Coordinates: 44°39′34″N 111°5′53″W
- Area: less than one acre
- Built: 1927
- Built by: Sam Eagle
- Architect: Fred F. Willson
- Architectural style: Rustic
- MPS: West Yellowstone MRA
- NRHP reference No.: 86002957
- Added to NRHP: November 6, 1986

Eagle's Store is a family business in West Yellowstone, Montana, whose three-story log building is listed on the National Register of Historic Places. The original store was established in 1908 on the same site and was razed in 1927 to make room for the present building, constructed in Rustic architectural style. Two blocks from the west entrance to Yellowstone National Park, Eagle's Store is the oldest operating business in West Yellowstone and is still run by the same family who founded it.

== History ==
Eyeing the growing popularity of tourism to Yellowstone National Park, the Union Pacific Railroad constructed its Oregon Short Line segment to the West Gate of Yellowstone Park between 1905 and 1907. In 1907, a Yellowstone Park employee, Samuel Peter Eagle, requested a United States Forest Service permit to lease commercial space next to the railroad's right of way. In June 1908, the Forest Service surveyed a six-block townsite on the western boundary of Yellowstone Park and issued business permits on one-acre (0.4 ha) plots. The first three business operators were Eagle and his partner, Alex Stuart, who built a general store; L. A. Murray, who opened the Yellowstone Hotel in 1909; and Charles Arnet, who opened the Yellowstone Store. While these and other ventures primarily served railway passengers in the early 20th century, the introduction of the automobile in 1916 brought many more visitors to Yellowstone Park, and business flourished, turning West Yellowstone into a permanent town.

In 1908, Stuart left the partnership to open his own business; he bought the lease to Arnet's store in 1910. Eagle's Store continued to be operated by Eagle and his descendants.

When it opened, Eagle's Store stocked "candies, tobaccos, Kodaks, postals, cigars, fishing rods and rented dusters." A white marble soda fountain manufactured by the Liquid Carbonic Company of Minnesota was added in 1910 for $1391.80., The local post office was located in Eagle's Store from 1909 to 1935, with Sam Eagle as the postmaster. Following the construction of its new building in 1930, the store began to offer a wider selection of merchandise and services. As of 2012, it sells sportswear, western wear, hiking and backpacking gear, fishing tackle, Native American arts and crafts, and souvenirs. The newer building retained the mahogany bar and soda fountain installed in 1910 and added a front bar and stools.

== Design ==
The original Eagle's Store, built by Eagle and Stuart, was a 12 feet (3.7 m) by 12 feet (3.7 m) structure with a false front. Eagle enlarged the store in 1913 and then had it razed in 1927 to build the three-story structure that stands today.

The current structure, begun in 1927 and completed in 1930, was designed by Bozeman architect Fred F. Willson, who also designed the Coca-Cola bottling plant that is part of the Bozeman Brewery Historic District. Willson donated his services to the project to promote the Western Rustic architectural style. The design was similar to Old Faithful Inn in Yellowstone Park, which utilizes the National Park Service rustic style, of which exposed logs are a key element. Willson set fir logs measuring 18 feet (5.5 m) to 36 feet (11 m) long into a base of rhyolite and concrete. Buttresses were made of basalt.

== Family business ==
All 10 of the children of Sam Eagle (1881–1950) and his wife, Ida Christine Carlson (1883–1962), worked in the store as children, as have many other descendants and relatives. Now in its fourth generation of ownership. Many family members are avid skiers, including Heather McPhie, a great-granddaughter of Sam and Ida, who competed in the 2010 Winter Olympics in Vancouver. The family has set up a charitable foundation, which benefits people with disabilities, education, and youth programs.

== See also ==
- National Register of Historic Places listings in Gallatin County, Montana

== Sources ==
- Shea, Paul (2009). West Yellowstone. Charleston, SC: Arcadia Publishing. ISBN 978-0-7385-7087-7.
