= Bobcat Stadium (Montana State University) =

Outdoor athletic stadium at Montana State University, Bozeman

Martel Field at Bobcat Stadium
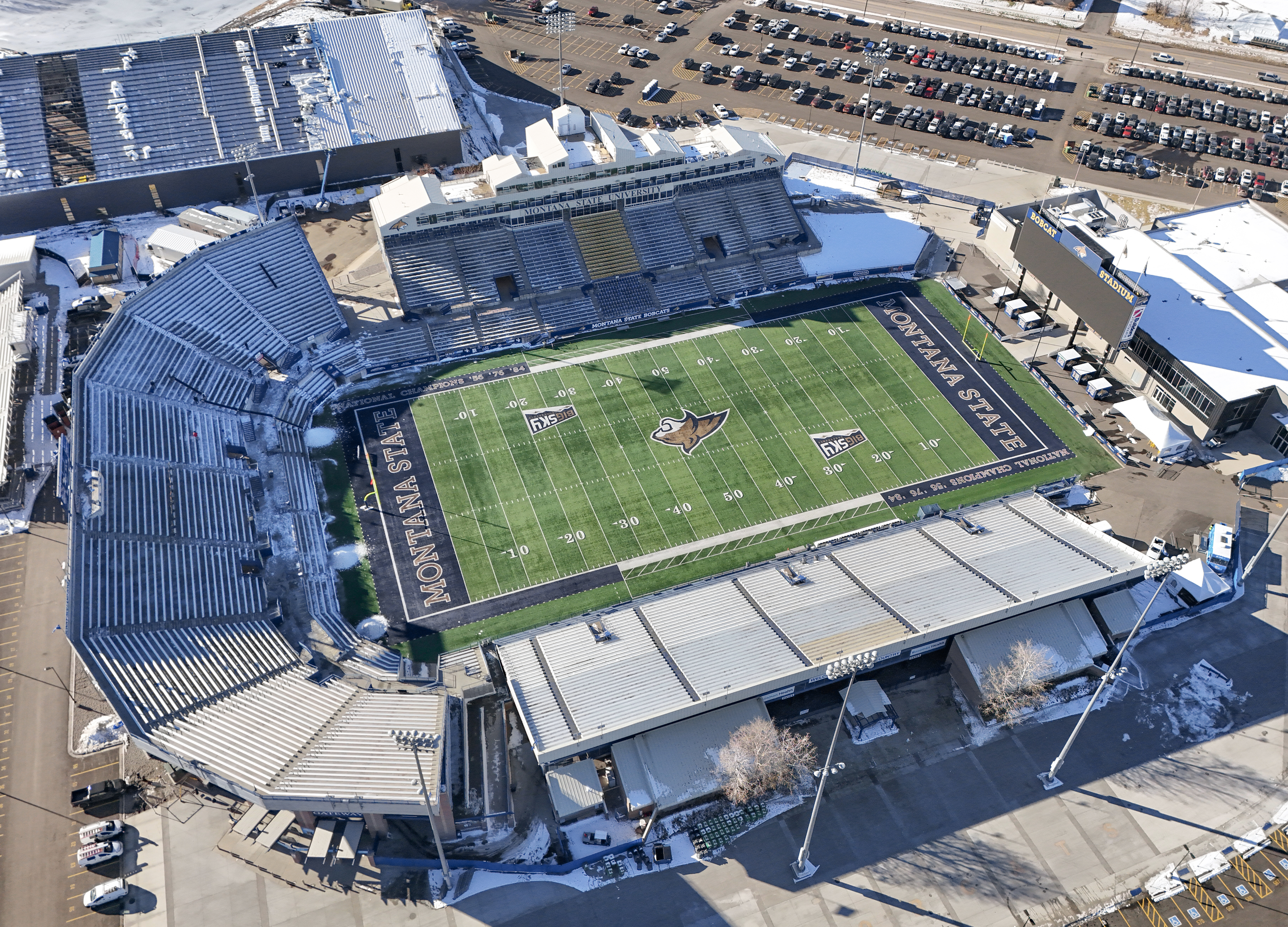
- Aerial view from northeast in December 2024

- Location in the United States Location in Montana
- Interactive map of Martel Field at Bobcat Stadium
- Former names: Reno H. Sales Stadium (1973–1997)
- Address: 1 Bobcat Circle
- Location: Montana State University; Bozeman, Montana, U.S.
- Coordinates: 45.659°N 111.049°W
- Elevation: 4,940 feet (1,505 m) AMSL
- Owner: Montana State University
- Operator: Montana State University
- Capacity: 20,767
- Surface: FieldTurf (2008–present); Natural grass (1973–2007)
- Record attendance: 25,437 (December 20th, 2025)

Construction
- Groundbreaking: 1972
- Opened: 1973 – Reno H. Sales; 53 years ago
- Renovated: 1998 – Bobcat Stadium
- Expanded: 2011
- Cost: $500,000 (original) $12 million upgrade (1998) $10 million upgrade (2011)
- Architect: Bauer Group Architects

Bobcat Stadium is an outdoor athletic stadium in the western United States, located on the campus of Montana State University in Bozeman, Montana. It is the home of the Montana State Bobcats college football team of the Big Sky Conference.

At the south end of campus, the stadium has a seating capacity of 20,767 and a NW-SE configuration, with the press box along the southwest sideline. Originally natural grass, the playing field was switched to FieldTurf in 2008 and is at an elevation of 4,940 feet (1,510 m) above sea level.

== History ==
=== Reno H. Sales Stadium ===
The stadium opened in 1973 as Reno Sales Stadium, built for about $500,000. Before that year, the Bobcats played elsewhere. Sales (1876–1969) was a lineman on the first Bobcat football team in 1897 and was the college's only graduate in 1898. Later in life he was an engineer and philanthropist. Born in Iowa, Sales moved with his family as a youngster to Montana in 1881 and they homesteaded near Salesville (now Gallatin Gateway); he was the chief geologist for Anaconda Copper for 41 years. During his long life, Sales was widely known as "Mr. Bobcat," and for his generosity and devotion to his alma mater.

=== Bobcat Stadium ===
Prior to the 1998 season, the stadium was renovated for about $12 million and renamed "Bobcat Stadium." The facility was designed to accommodate further expansion in the southeast end zone.

On October 6, 2010, the university was granted approval by the board of regents to proceed with the planning, design and eventual construction of new endzone seating and related enhancements to Bobcat Stadium. Some of the enhancements include new visiting team and referee locker rooms, restrooms, an 18-by-37-foot (5.5 m × 11.3 m) LED video board in the north end zone, and a new scoreboard atop the new section. The new 7,200-seat end zone "bowl" connects the two sideline grandstands. The renovation was projected to cost $8–10 million; $4 million was required to be raised privately with the remaining amount to be financed and paid for through ticket and other athletics related revenue. No new student fees or other public money was to be used for the project. A day before the project was presented to the board of regents, it was an announced that an anonymous individual donated $1 million to the project in honor of former Bobcat legend Sonny Holland.

Ground was broken for the expansion on January 28, 2011, and the work was completed in time for the home opener against UC Davis on September 10.

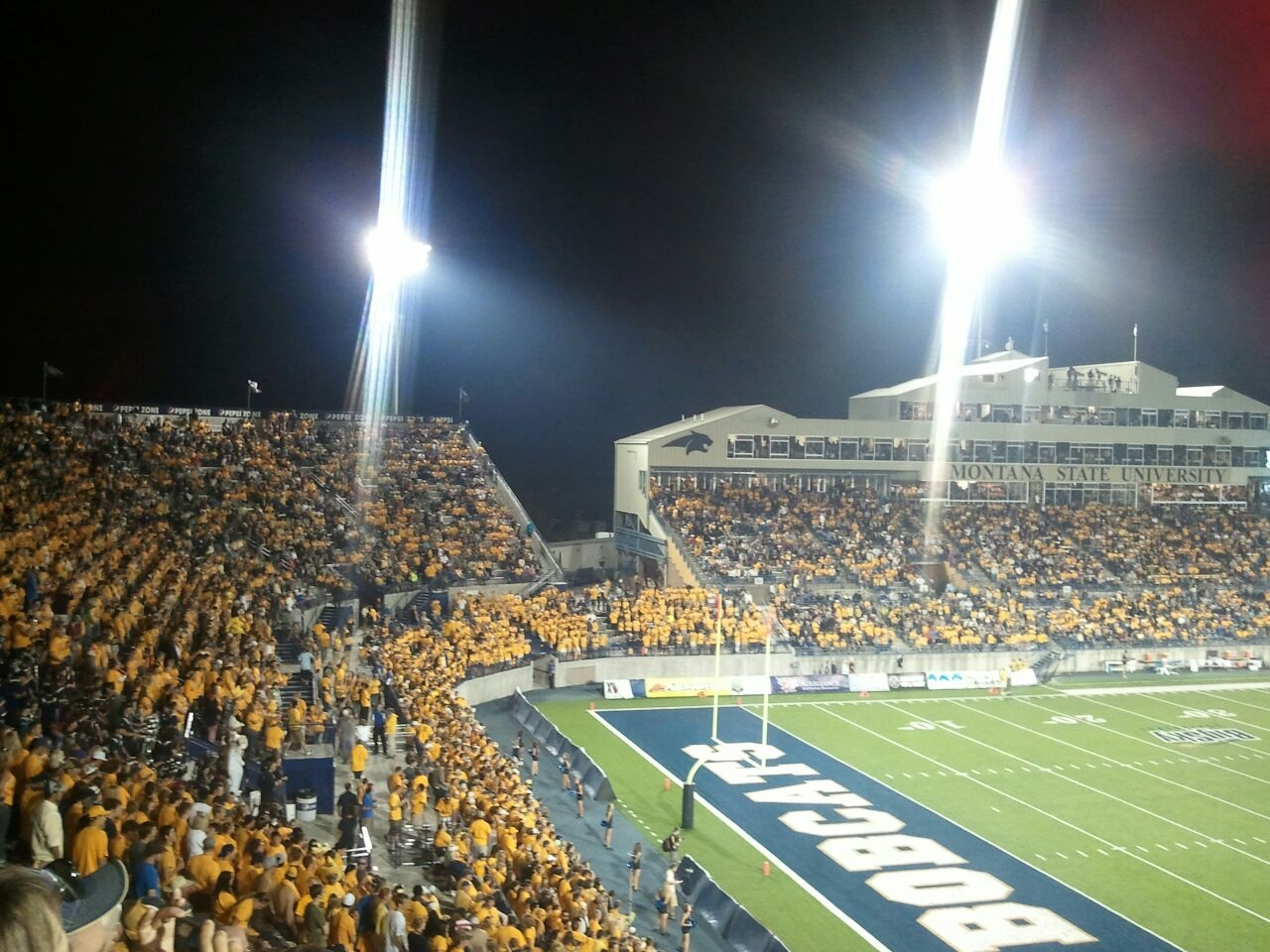
2012 home opener; the first night game in Bobcat Stadium history

The upgraded stadium has 17,777 seats, but capacity is routinely expanded through the use of standing room only areas and temporary bleachers in the north endzone. An attendance record of 20,767 was established during the 2012 season opener vs. Chadron State on August 30. Bobcat Stadium set a new record with 21,007 at the 2013 season opener against Monmouth on August 29. The record was further broken twice during the 2022 season, first in the season opener vs. McNeese State on September 4, then again in season finale against archrival Montana, when 22,047 attended the Brawl of the Wild with College GameDay also in town.

The attendance record was broken three times in the 2025 season, with 22,117 attending the home opener against South Dakota State on September 6, and 22,227 showing up for the contest against Eastern Washington on September 27. Attendance was first reported as 25,437 for the FCS Semifinals against Montana on December 20 but subsequent reporting from Bobcat Athletics set the official attendance at 22,227 tying the all-time record.

The venue was further enhanced with floodlights through the use of donations obtained in the fall of 2011. Since 2012, MSU has had the capability to host night games and meet television broadcasting lighting requirements.

=== Athletic Facility Master Plan ===
In 2017, MSU Athletics published its 20-year Athletic Facility Master Plan which envisions renovating and constructing athletic facilities to serve student-athletes and fans. As part of Phase One of the masterplan, MSU constructed the Bobcat Athletic Complex, a 40,000-square-foot football operations facility that encloses the northwest end of the stadium, and hosted its grand opening on October 8, 2021. The Bobcat Athletic Complex provides student-athletes with study spaces, locker rooms, and team meeting rooms, as well as training, health, and rehabilitation facilities, strength training room, nutrition room, and fueling station. It also houses the football program, including a team lounge and offices for coaches and staff. The $18-million-dollar facility was funded by private donors.

The masterplan also includes future renovations to the East Sideline, North End Zone, and West Sideline. The East Sideline renovations envision a new stadium entry and 6,400 seats, including general and accessible seating, premium seating options, and club-style seats. The concourses will consist of improved restroom facilities, new concession opportunities, retail spaces, and access to a premium lounge.

The North End Zone renovations will be designed to integrate with and enhance the Bobcat Athletic Complex, serving to complete the bowl by connecting the East and West Sidelines. The North End Zone will provide 2,000 additional seats, including general and accessible seating, while also providing concourse space below with restrooms and concessions. A new scoreboard, videoboard, and stadium sound system are included as part of this project, or as a stand-alone project, coordinating with the North End Zone seating and the Bobcat Athletic Complex.

The existing West Sideline and Press Box Tower will be completely renovated to improve fan amenities and the spectator experience. Minor renovations to the seating bowl are envisioned, including improved access to the renovated Tower. The Tower renovations will include upgrading the concourse, concessions, restrooms, retail points, and stadium entry points, improving the second-level corporate hospitality area, third-level Stadium Club and Sky Suites, and fourth-floor Sky Suites, and completely renovating the fifth-level press box, media, and coaches’ spaces. The entire Tower façade will be redesigned to create the centerpiece for the stadium bowl.

== Previous venues ==
=== Gatton Field ===
Through the 1971 season, the Bobcats played home games for four decades at Gatton Field. It was located directly south of Romney Hall, across Grant Street Promenade and northeast of the Brick Breeden Fieldhouse, which opened in 1957. The playing field ran east–west and had lighting as far back as the 1940s. It was razed in early 1972, and is now the site of the Student Wellness Center (opened in 2024). and Norm Asbjornson Hall (opened in 2018). Bobcat Stadium is approximately a half-mile (0.8 km) due south, across Kagy boulevard.

The field was named for Cyrus J. Gatton, a former Montana State football player from 1913 to 1916. Born in Iowa and raised in Bozeman, Gatton enlisted in the U.S. Army Air Service during World War I and was killed in northeast France while flying for the 11th Aero Squadron on November 4, just a week before the Armistice. The class of 1917 voted in 1920 that when the school built a new football field it should be named for Cyrus Gatton, and the request was honored ten years later.

=== Van Winkle Stadium ===
The new stadium was not completed for the 1972 season; the Bobcats played their home games at Van Winkle Stadium at Bozeman High School, with expanded temporary seating. Despite the change of venue, MSU lost just one home game, won the Big Sky title (5–1), and finished 8–3 overall.

== See also ==
- List of NCAA Division I FCS football stadiums
