= Gallatin County Courthouse (Montana) =

- U.S. National Register of Historic Places
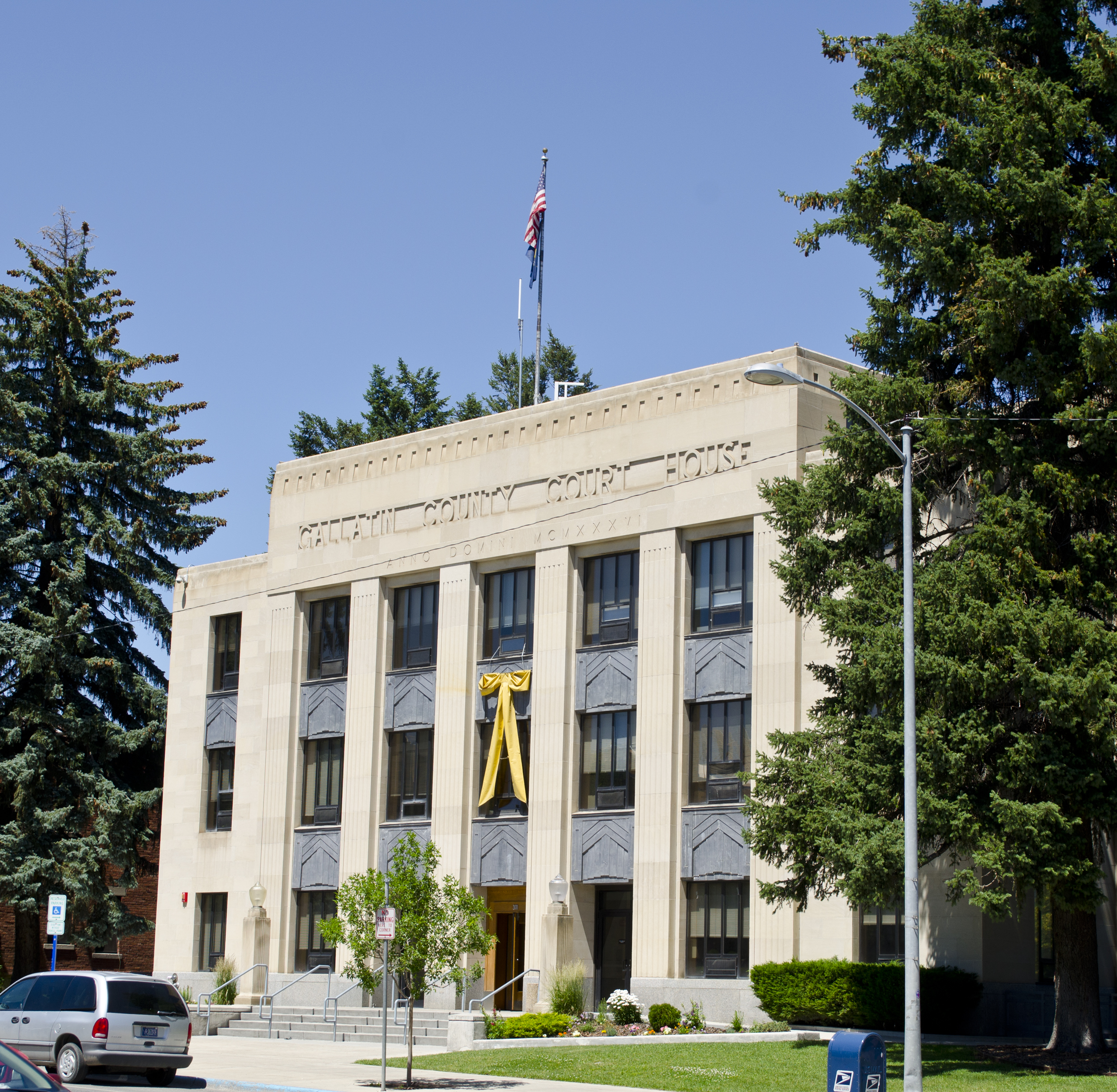

- Location within Montana
- Interactive map showing the location of Gallatin County Courthouse
- Location: 311 W. Main, Bozeman, Montana
- Coordinates: 45°40′47″N 111°02′28″W
- Area: less than one acre
- Built: 1935
- Architect: Fred F. Willson
- Architectural style: Art Deco
- MPS: Bozeman MRA
- NRHP reference No.: 87001794
- Added to NRHP: December 21, 1987

The Gallatin County Courthouse, at 311 W. Main in Bozeman, Montana, is an Art Deco style courthouse built in 1935–36. It was listed on the National Register of Historic Places in 1987.

It is the most notable example of Art Deco style in Bozeman. It was designed, perhaps as early as 1933, by local architect Fred F. Willson, who practiced in Bozeman from 1900 to 1956.
