= Fred F. Willson =

American architect (1877–1956)

Fred Fielding Willson
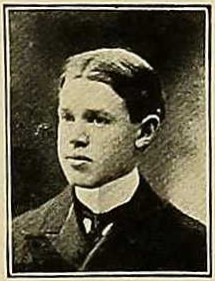
- Willson in the Columbia University yearbook, 1902
- Born: November 11, 1877; Bozeman, Territory of Montana
- Died: August 13, 1956 (aged 78); Bozeman, Montana
- Education: Columbia University
- Occupation: Architect

Fred Fielding Willson (November 11, 1877 – August 13, 1956), most commonly known as Fred F. Willson, was an architect in Bozeman, Montana, who designed many buildings that are listed on the National Register of Historic Places.

== Early life ==
He was born in Bozeman, Montana, on November 11, 1877, the son of American Civil War general Lester S. Willson and Emma Weeks Willson. After attending Bozeman public schools and the Bozeman Academy, he studied at Montana State College, for which he later designed buildings. Willson designed buildings on campus such as Hamilton Hall, the Student Union Building, the heating plant, Herrick Hall, the Chemistry Building, and Fort Ellis Ranch House. He left Montana State as a junior to attend Columbia University, where he received his Bachelor of Arts in architecture in 1902.

== Early career ==
After graduating from Columbia, Willson worked in Helena, Montana, for architect C.S. Haire for two years. In November 1904, to broaden his architectural experiences, Willson started an extended tour of Europe, including France, Germany, Italy and the United Kingdom. He documented his impressions of European architecture and daily life in Europe during the early 20th century in his personal diaries. While in France, he studied at the Ecole des Beaux Arts in Paris. Willson returned to New York in 1906 to work for the architecture firm Visscher & Burley. In late 1906, took charge of the offices of architects Link & Haire in Butte, Montana, where he worked until returning to Bozeman in 1910.

== Bozeman architecture ==
Fred Willson played a significant role in the architectural face of downtown Bozeman and surrounding residential areas. His European experience significantly influences his designs which include representatives of multiple architectural styles—Georgian, Mission Revival, Art Deco and Craftsman. In 1927 Willson designed a new, three-story structure for Eagle's Store on the site of the original store built in West Yellowstone, Montana, in 1908. Willson donated his expertise in order to promote the National Park Service rustic architectural style.

Between January 1910 and 1928 Willson worked as an architect under his own name. Between 1928 and 1932 he was in the partnership of Shanley, Willson & Hugenin. From 1932 until his death in 1956, Willson again was an independent architect. Many of his buildings are landmarks in downtown Bozeman—the Gallatin County Court House, the Baxter Hotel, the Hamill and Blackmore Apartments. The Willson Middle School, originally the Gallatin County High School, was his design and now bears his name. An early design was the Gallatin County Jail (1911), which still remains today housing the Gallatin Historical Society and Pioneer Museum on Main Street.

In a 1954 address at Montana State University, Willson expressed his architectural philosophy:

Since no two problems are the same, the architect must visit the site, become intimately acquainted with the family or owner who is to occupy the structure. He must try to get himself into their way of thinking, living or operating. He must study their personality, mode of living, individual family requirements and provide a structure suitable for their needs. Few people realize the care and thought necessary to secure the maximum of useable (sic) space and still have an attractive interior and exterior. He must have knowledge of balance, proportion, scale and harmony. There is a fundamental reason for every feature embodied in a structure. It must have refinement, simplicity, beauty and good taste. Thus an architect's business is to make the things of daily life beautiful.

— Fred F. Willson, MSU Knowledge Quest, 1954

== Family and civic life ==
Willson was active in the Bozeman community and in professional organizations. He served as a member of the city council and the city commission. He was a member of the Montana State Board of Architectural Examiners for Licensing, a Masonic Lodge and local Benevolent and Protective Order of Elks member. He also served as the regional director of the American Institute of Architects. Fred Willson married Helen Fisher on October 15, 1913. They had three children: Lester, Virginia and Beverly. Willson died in Bozeman, Montana, on August 13, 1956. He is buried in the Willson family plot, Sunset Hills Cemetery, Bozeman.

== Works and legacy ==
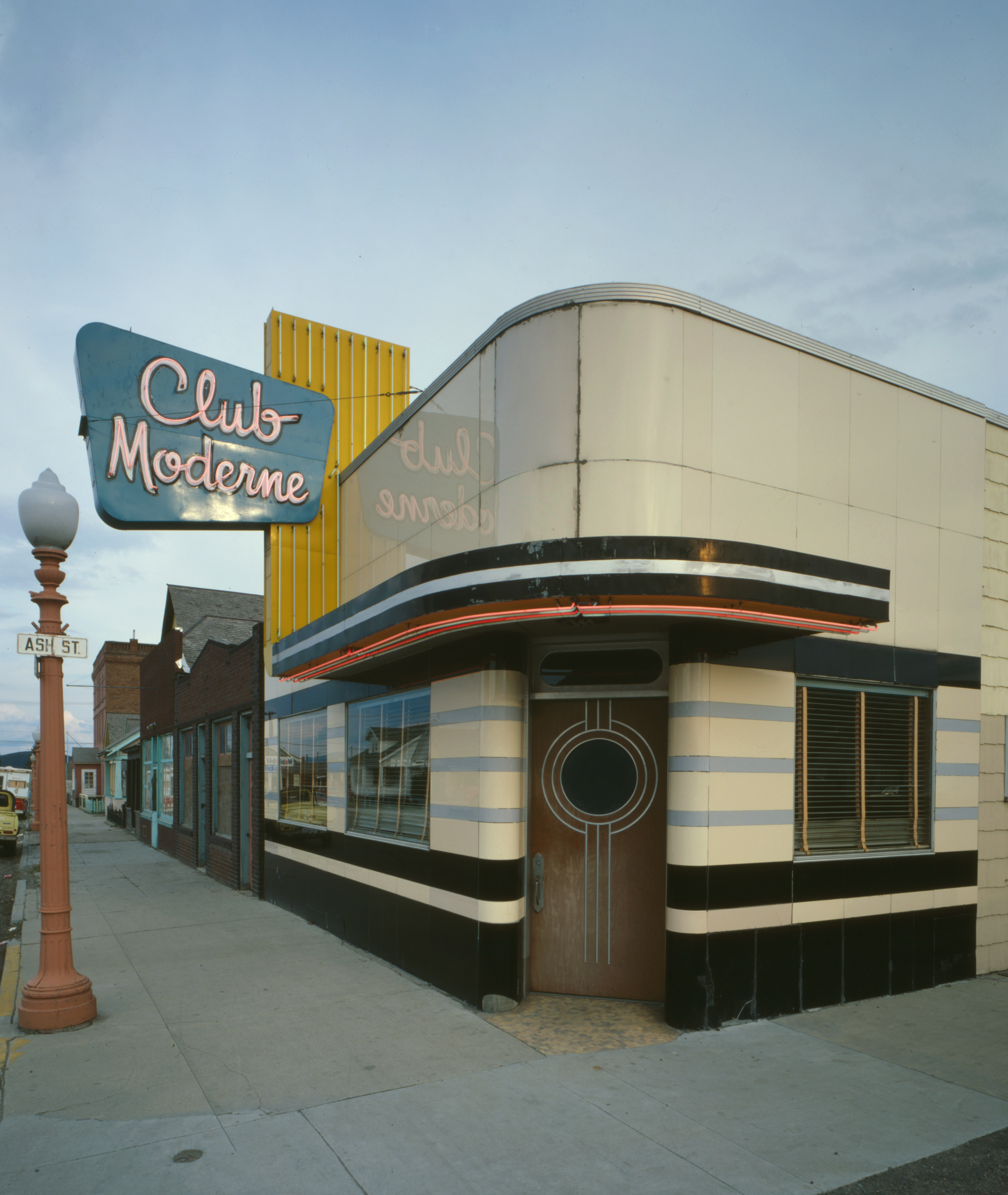
Club Moderne, Anaconda, Montana, built 1937

Between 1910 and his death in 1956, Willson was responsible for at least 330 architectural projects in Bozeman and other cities of Montana. Many of his projects are now listed on the National Register of Historic Places. His papers and many of his drawings are now held by Archives and Special Collections at the Montana State University Library.

=== NRHP listed works ===
- Barrett Hospital, Chapman and S. Atlantic Streets, Dillon, Montana
- Jack Bartlett House, 8 W. Harrison, Bozeman, Montana
- Belgrade City Hall and Jail, Broadway at Northern Pacific Blvd., Belgrade, Montana, (1912)
- Blackmore Apartments, 120 S. Black St., Bozeman, Montana
- Bozeman Armory, 24 W. Mendenhall, Bozeman, Montana (now the Armory Hotel Bozeman)
- Coca-Cola bottling plant that is part of the Bozeman Brewery Historic District, 700-800 N. Wallace St., Bozeman, Montana
- Bozeman Sheet Metal Works, 26 S. Grand, Bozeman, Montana
- Bozeman YMCA, 6 W. Babcock, Bozeman, Montana
- Club Moderne, 811 E. Park Anaconda, Montana, (1937)
- Daly Gym, 400 Main St. Anaconda, Montana (1915)
- Dokken-Nelson Funeral Home, 113 S. Willson, Bozeman, Montana
- Eagle's Store, 3 Canyon St., West Yellowstone, Montana
- Emerson School, 111 S. Grand Ave., Bozeman, Montana
- First Baptist Church, 120 S. Grand, Bozeman, Montana
- Gallatin County Courthouse, 301 W. Main, Bozeman, Montana
- Gallatin County High School, 404 W. Main, Bozeman, Montana
- Gallatin County Jail, 317 W. Main St., Bozeman, Montana (1911)
- Graf Building, 219—221 W. Arthur, Bozeman, Montana
- Hamill Apartments, 427 E. Main, Bozeman, Montana
- Hotel Baxter, 105 W. Main St., Bozeman, Montana
- One or more works in Main Street Historic District, 100 block. W. Main-300 block. E. Main, Bozeman, Montana
- One or more works in Northern Pacific-Story Mill Historic District, roughly bounded by the Northern Pacific Railroad right-of-way and the Story Mill spur line from Wye to Bridger Canyon Rd., Bozeman, Montana
- Sacajawea Hotel, Three Forks, Montana
- One or more works in South Tracy-South Black Historic District, 200-600 blocks. of S. Tracy & S. Black Aves., Bozeman, Montana
- One or more works in South Willson Historic District, Willson Ave. between Curtiss and Arthur Streets., Bozeman, Montana
- Story Motor Company, 202 W. Main, Bozeman, Montana

=== Other notable works ===
- Lehrkind Brewery Building, Bozeman, Montana
- Mary Innes School, Dillon, Montana
Works by Fred F. Willson
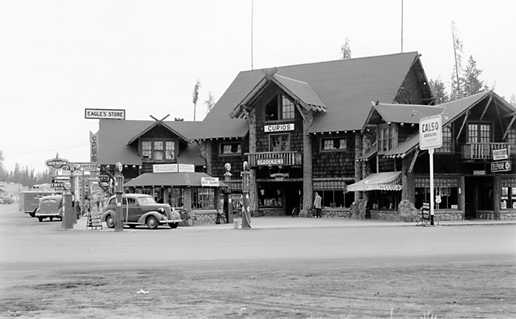
Eagle's Store, 1939

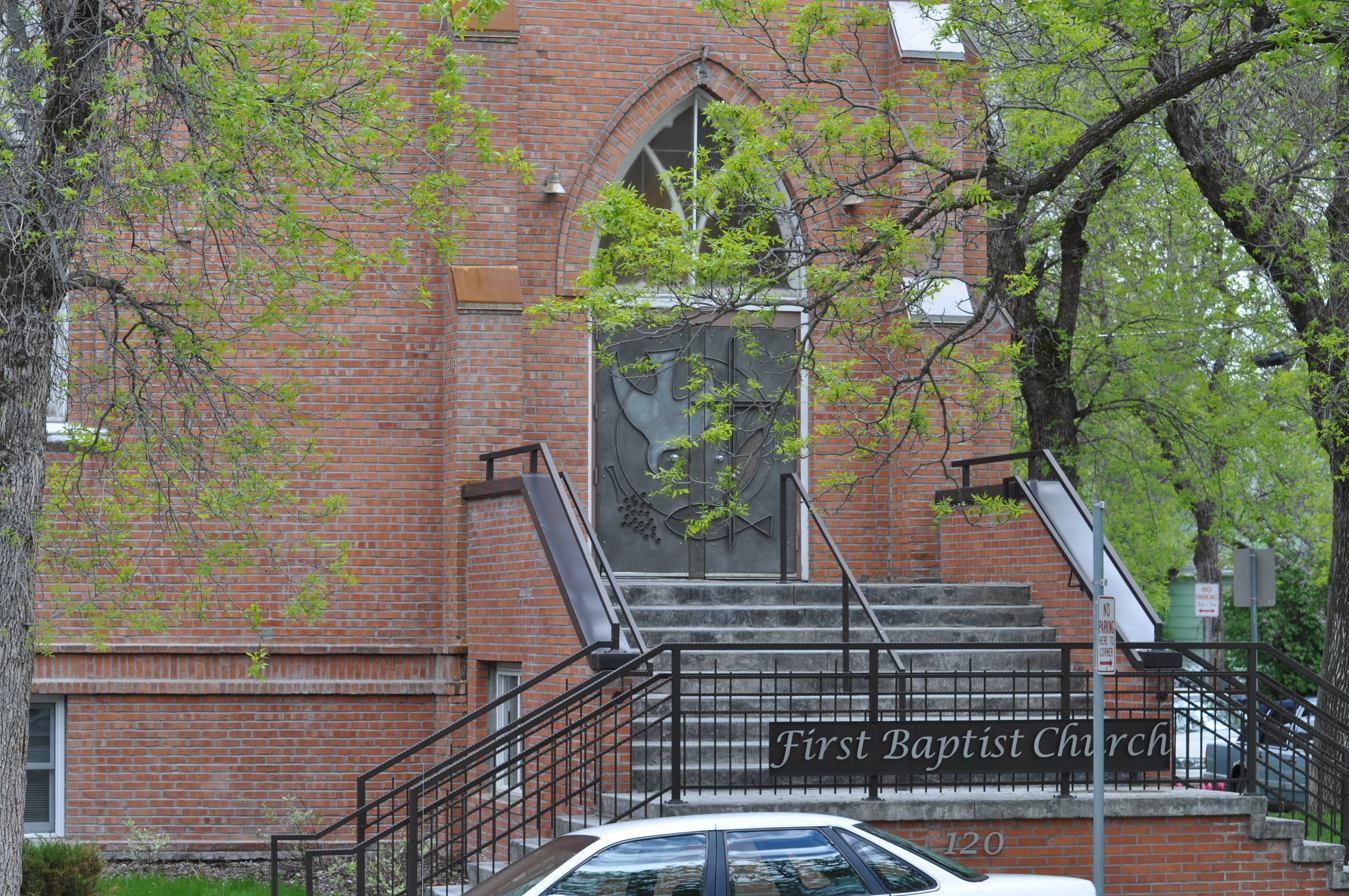
First Baptist Church, Bozeman

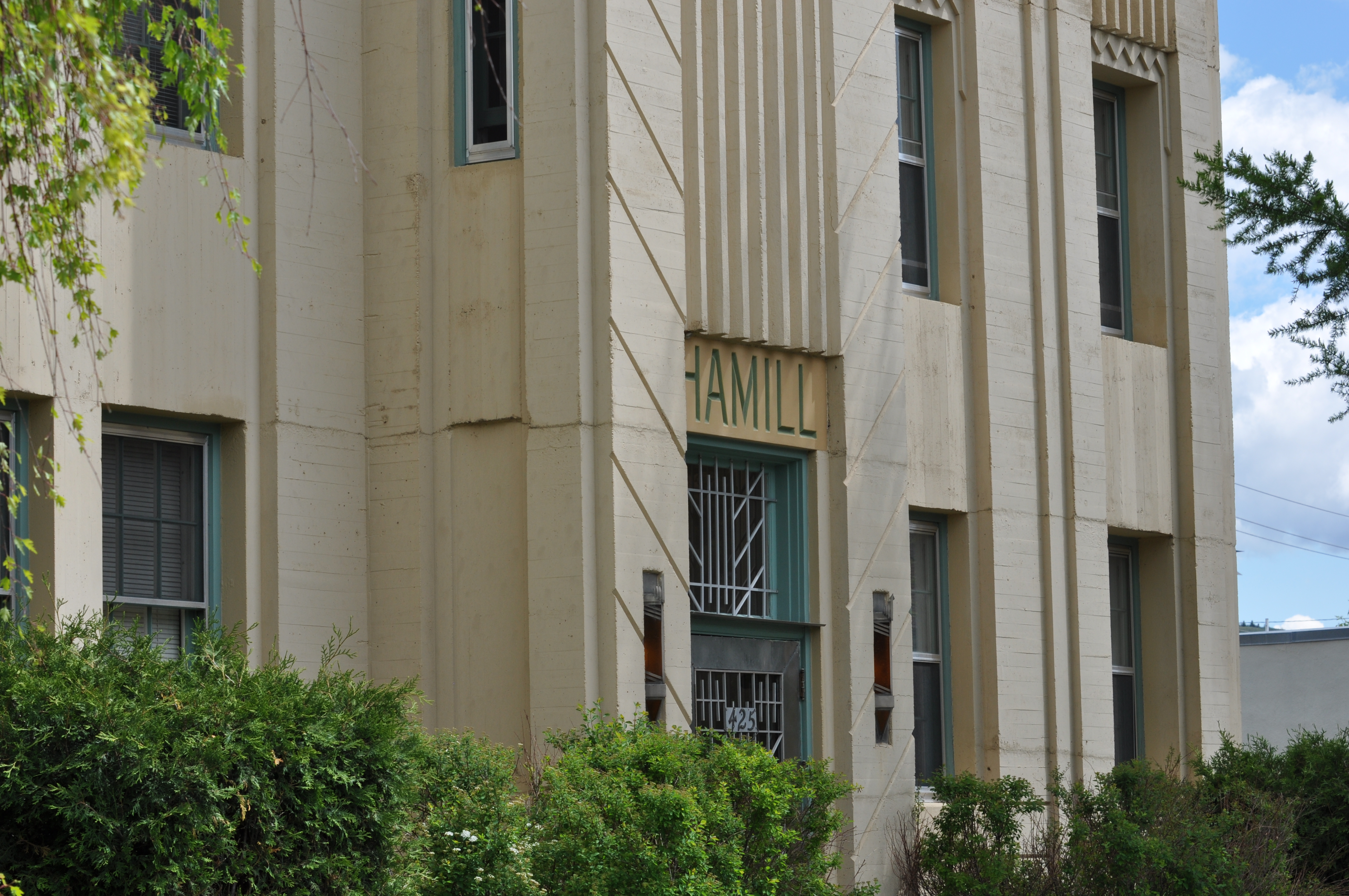
Hamill Apartments, Bozeman

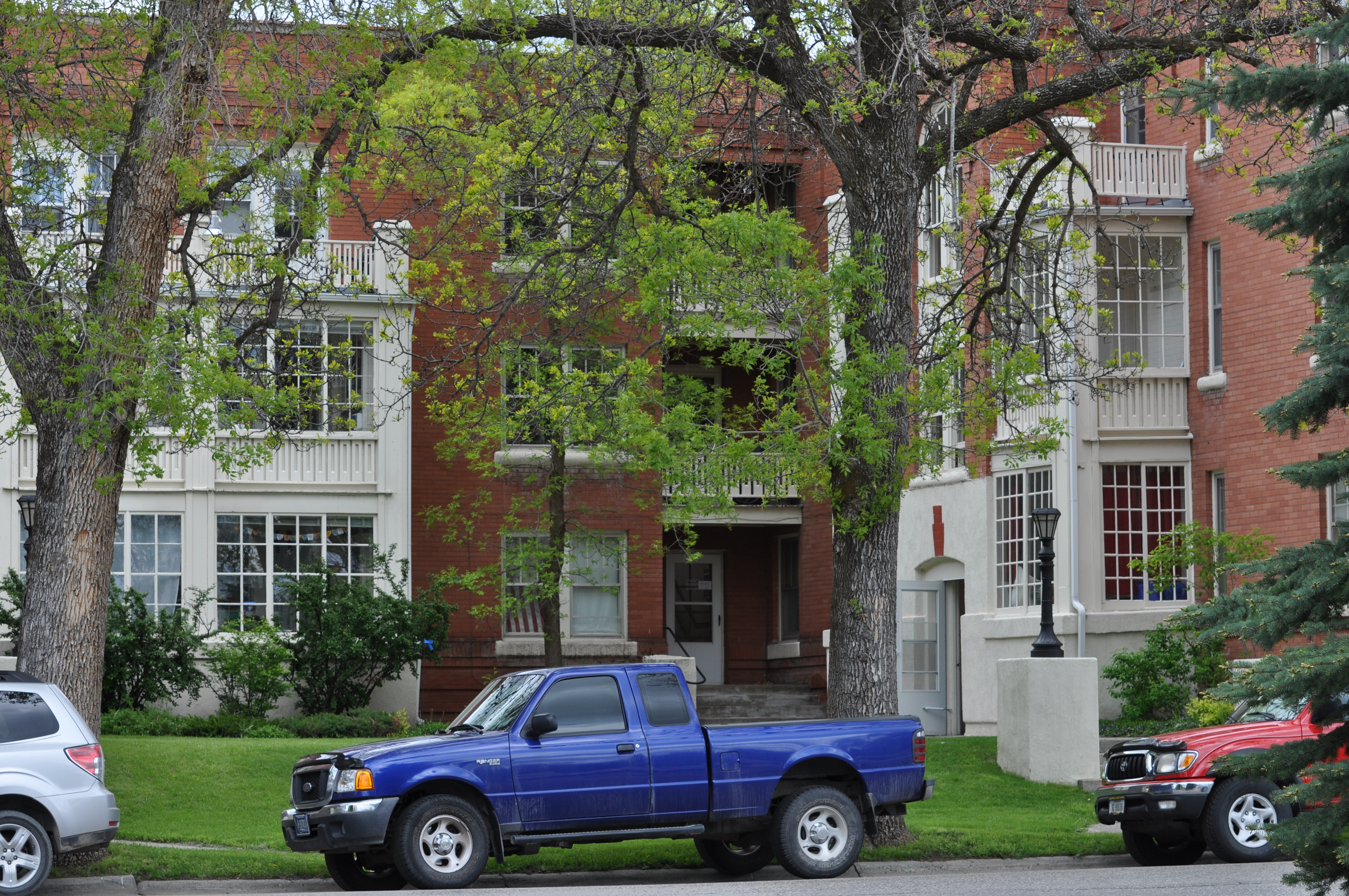
Blackmore Apartments, Bozeman

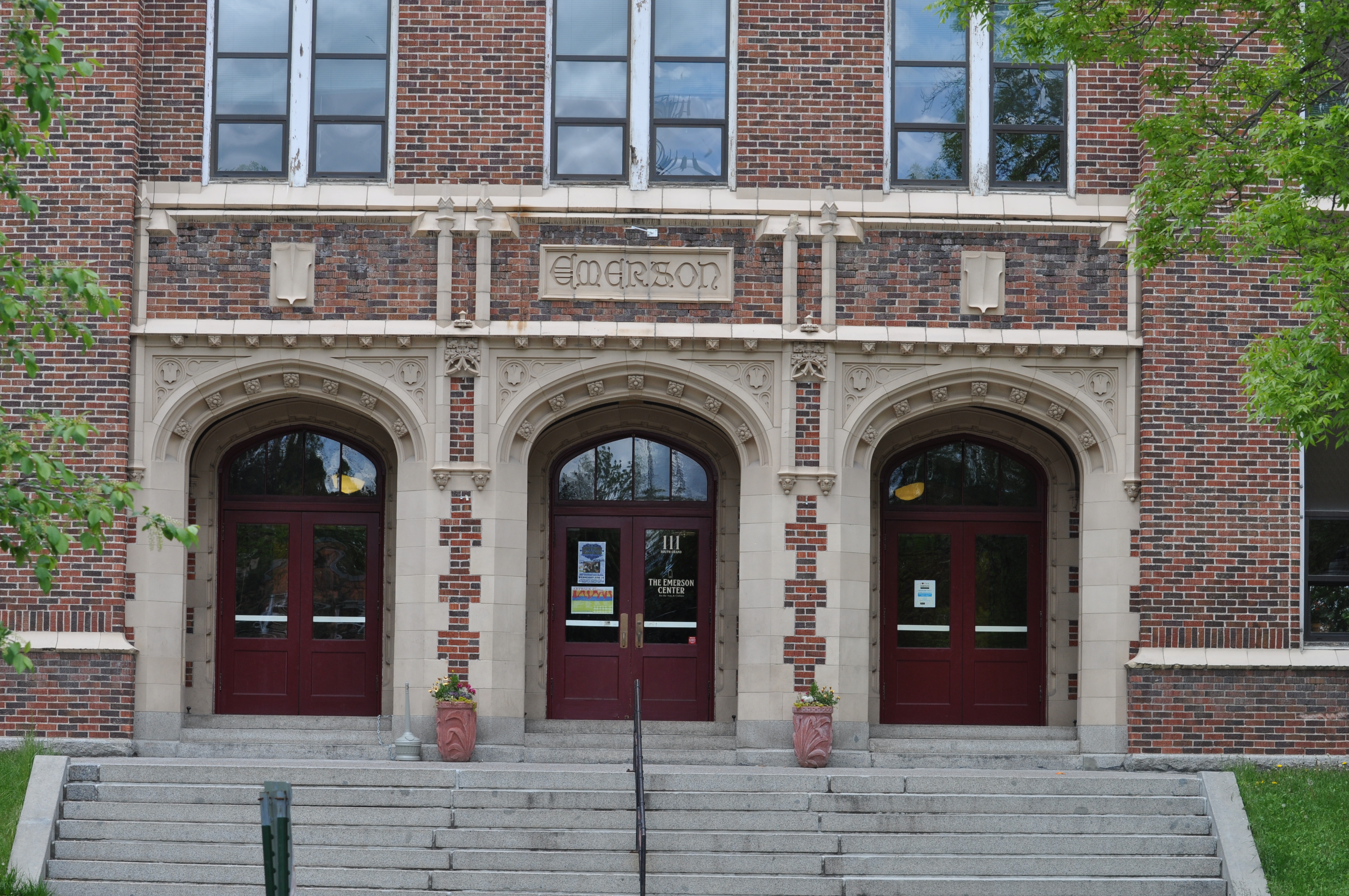
Emerson Center (formerly Emerson School), Bozeman

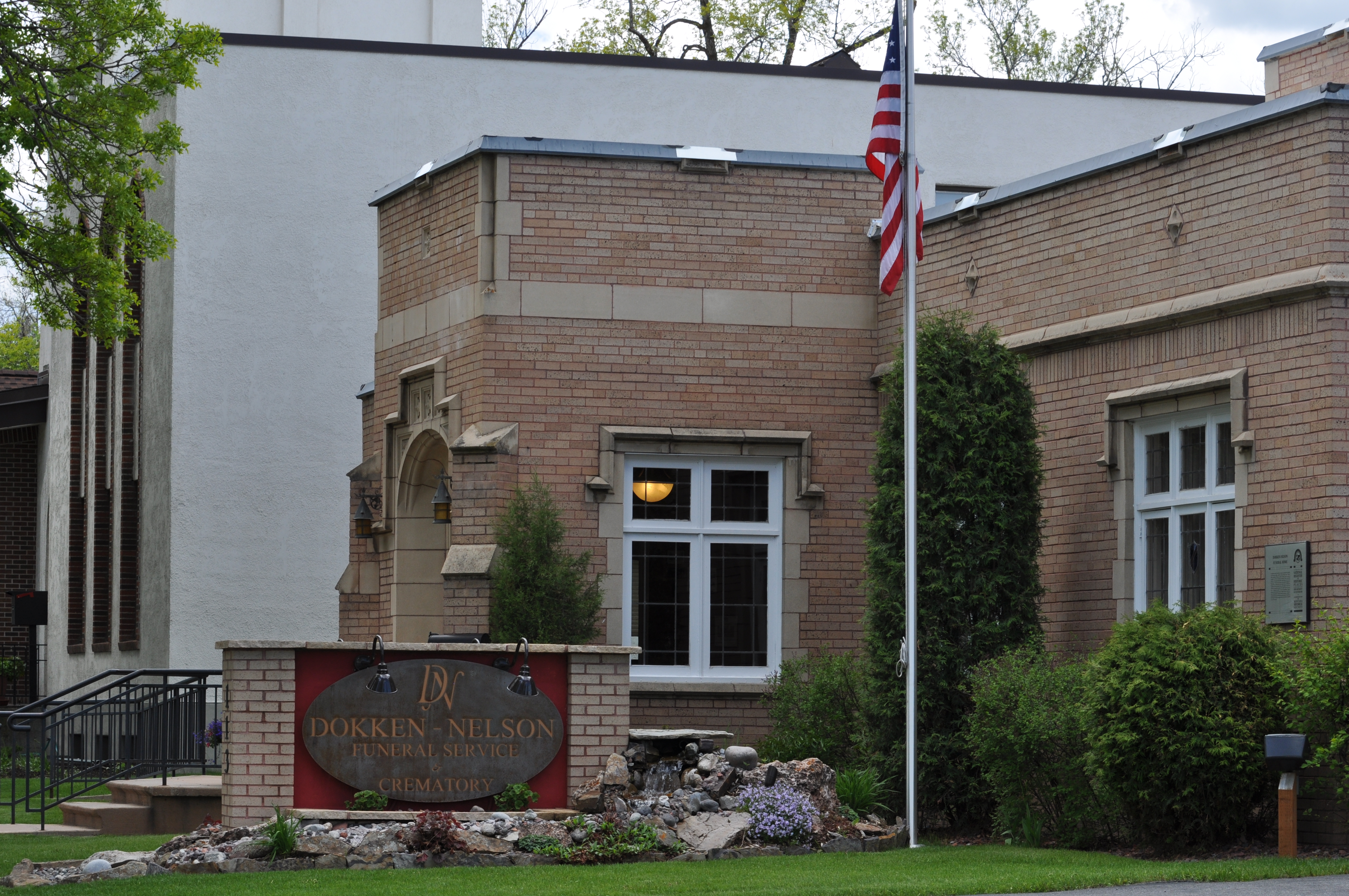
Dokken-Nelson Funeral Home, Bozeman

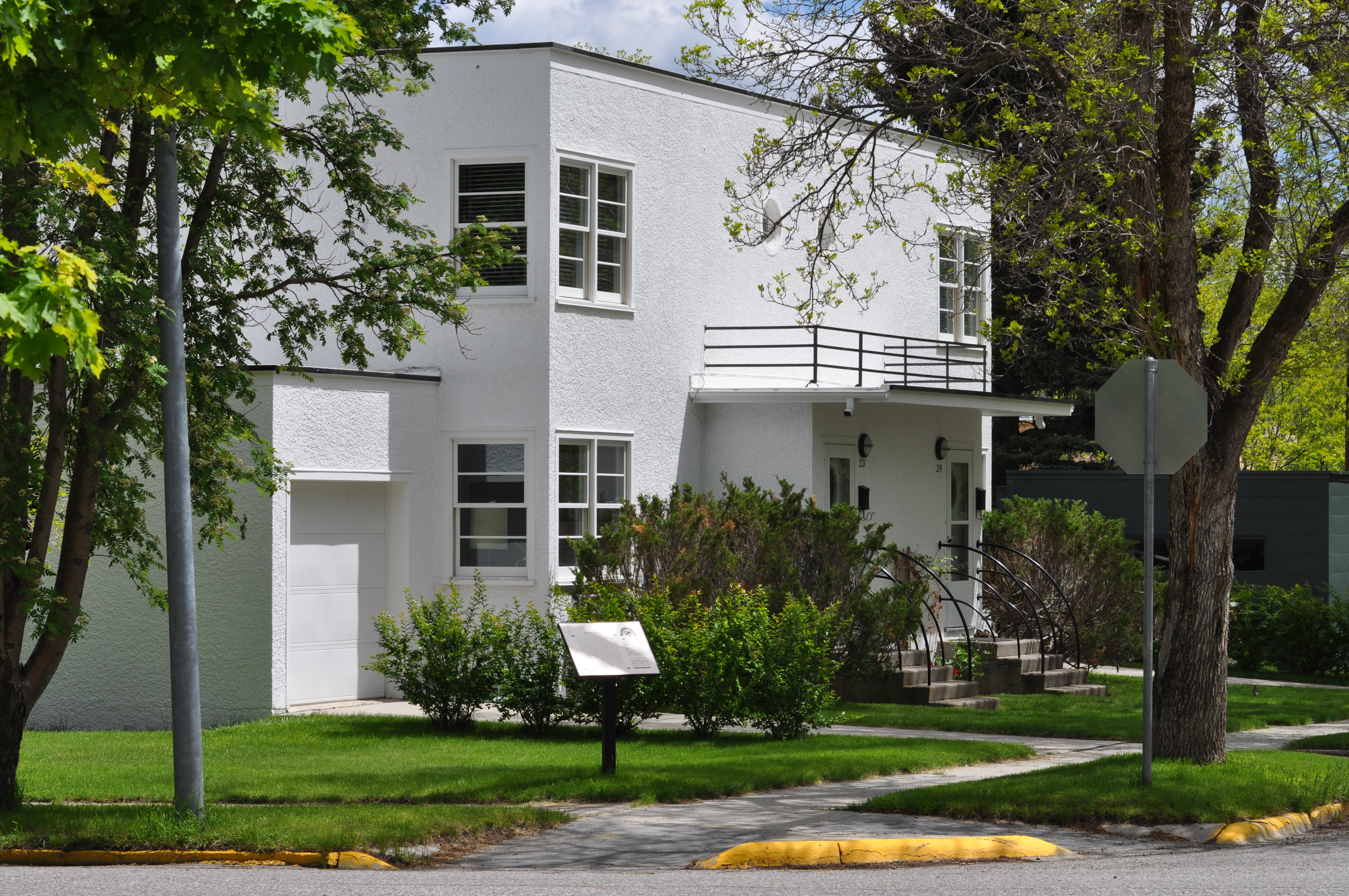
Graf Building, Bozeman

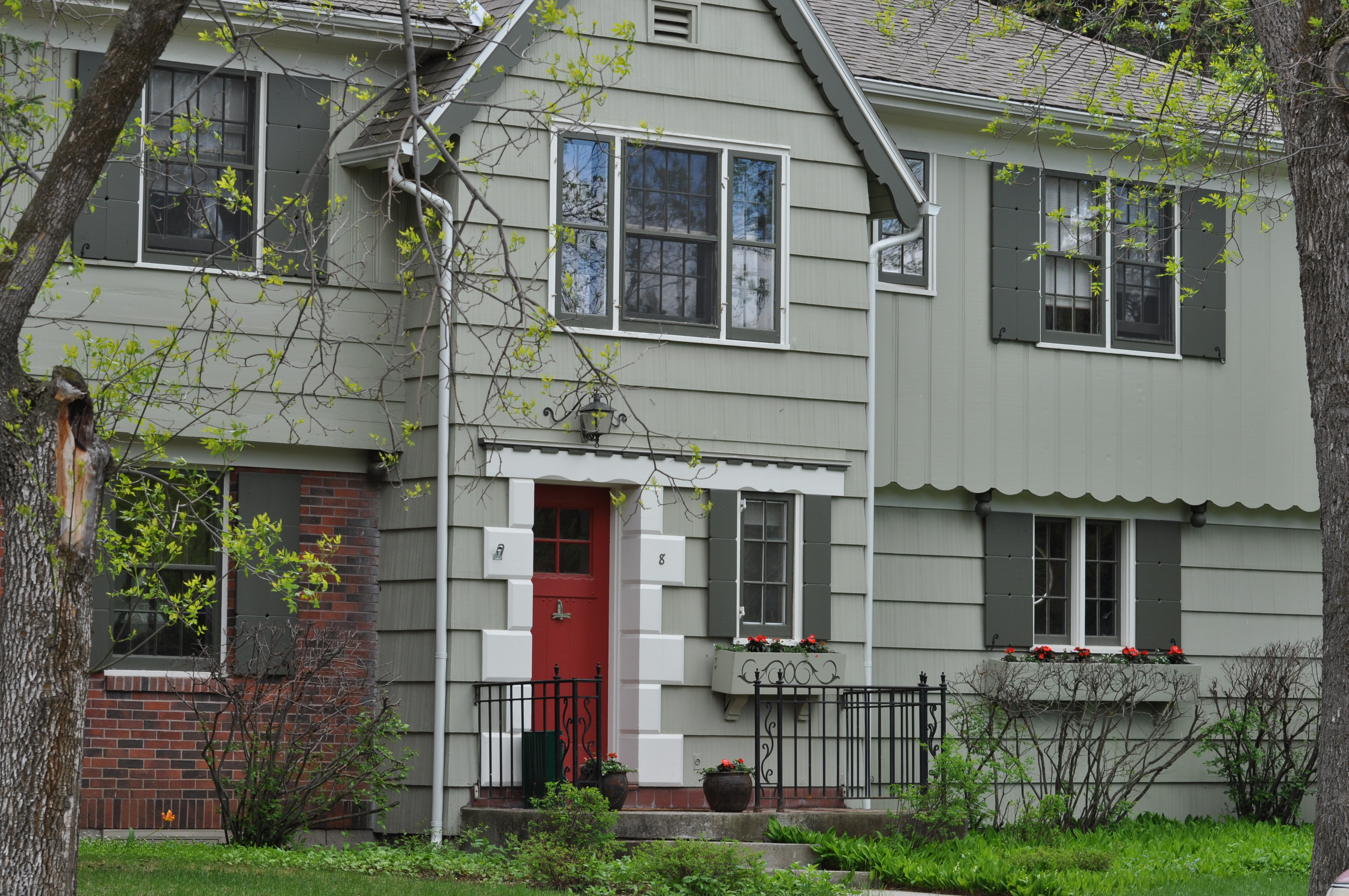
Jack Bartlett House, Bozeman

== See also ==
- Moderne architecture
