= Sip 'n Dip Lounge =

Tiki bar in Great Falls, Montana

Coordinates: 47.5045°N 111.2952°W

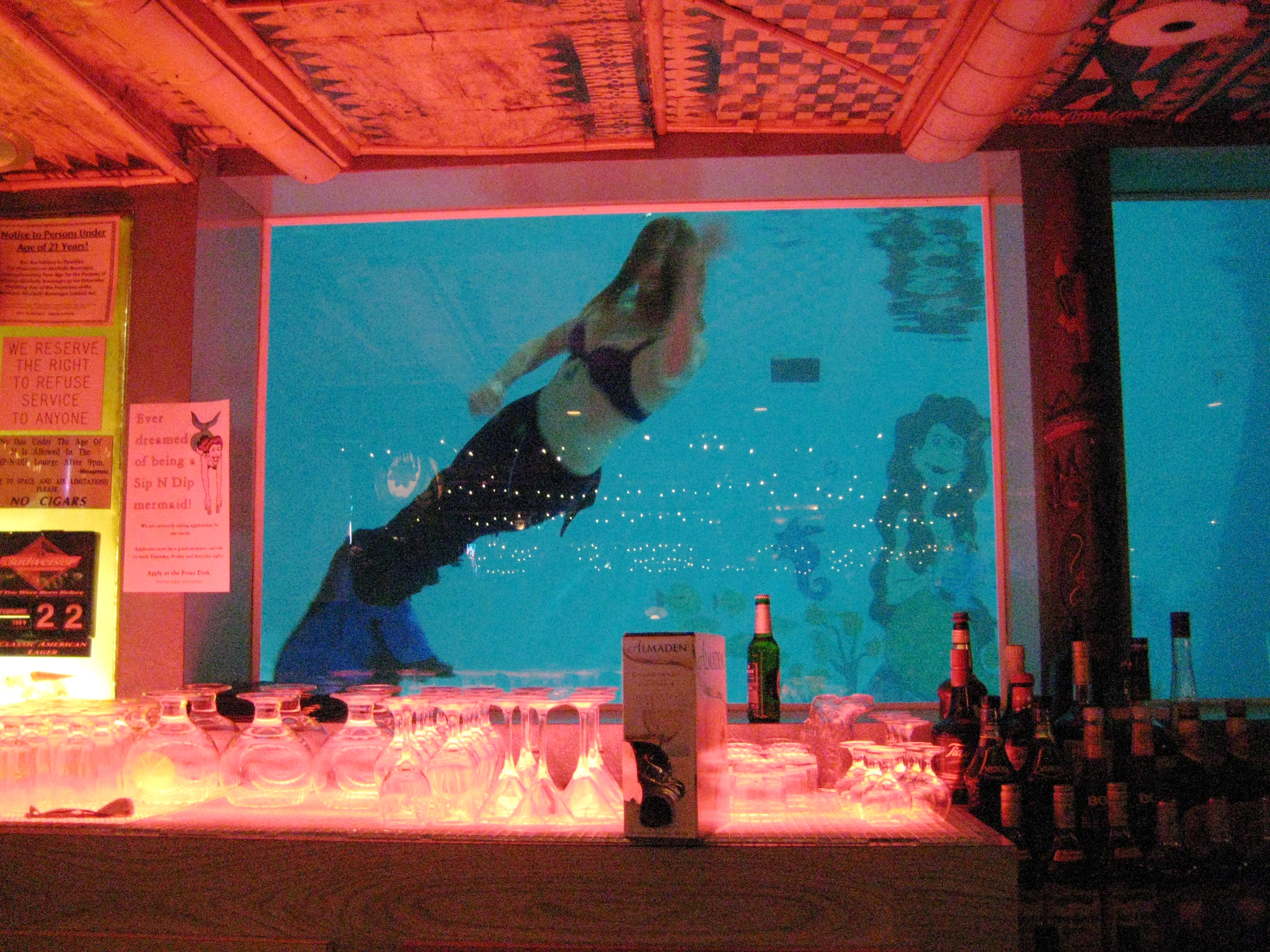
- A "mermaid" at the Sip 'n Dip
- Type: Tiki bar
- Founded: 1962
- Headquarters: Great Falls, Montana, United States
- Area served: North Central Montana
- Parent: O'Haire Motor Inn
- Website: ohairemotorinn.com

The Sip 'n Dip Lounge is a tiki bar in Great Falls, Montana, US, opened in 1962, when Polynesian themes were popular. It has survived to the present day with its tiki theme intact. Located inside a local motel that was considered modern and trendy at the time it was built, the Sip 'n Dip is known for having people dressed as mermaids swimming underwater in an indoor swimming pool visible through a window in the bar. Decorated with a bamboo ceiling and a South Seas theme, the bar featured Patricia "Piano Pat" Sponheim, noted for her unique "jazzy" style, who played piano there from 1963 until her death in May 2021.

The mermaid concept was introduced in 1995 when there was a revival of the tiki fad and was the brainchild of the bar's current owner who wanted to add a "fun factor". It became popular, particularly for Montana, a landlocked northern state where a tropical tiki theme is unexpected. Beginning in 2003, the bar began to gain prominence outside Montana, when the magazine GQ listed the lounge in its list of the top ten bars in the world, ranking it as the "#1 bar...worth flying for". The bar usually employs six women, who wear mermaid outfits designed and hand-made by the bar's manager, Sandra Johnson-Thares. Mermen were brought back in 2016, having previously appeared on occasion from the late 1990s to 2004.

Celebrity patrons of the Sip 'n Dip have included the actors Nick Nolte and Daryl Hannah, who reprised her portrayal of a mermaid in Splash by swimming in the pool while wearing a mermaid tail. Both actors signed the glass window, though their autographs were lost two years later when the window cracked, forcing the pool to be drained and repaired and the double-paned glass replaced with a triple-paned version.

== History and design ==
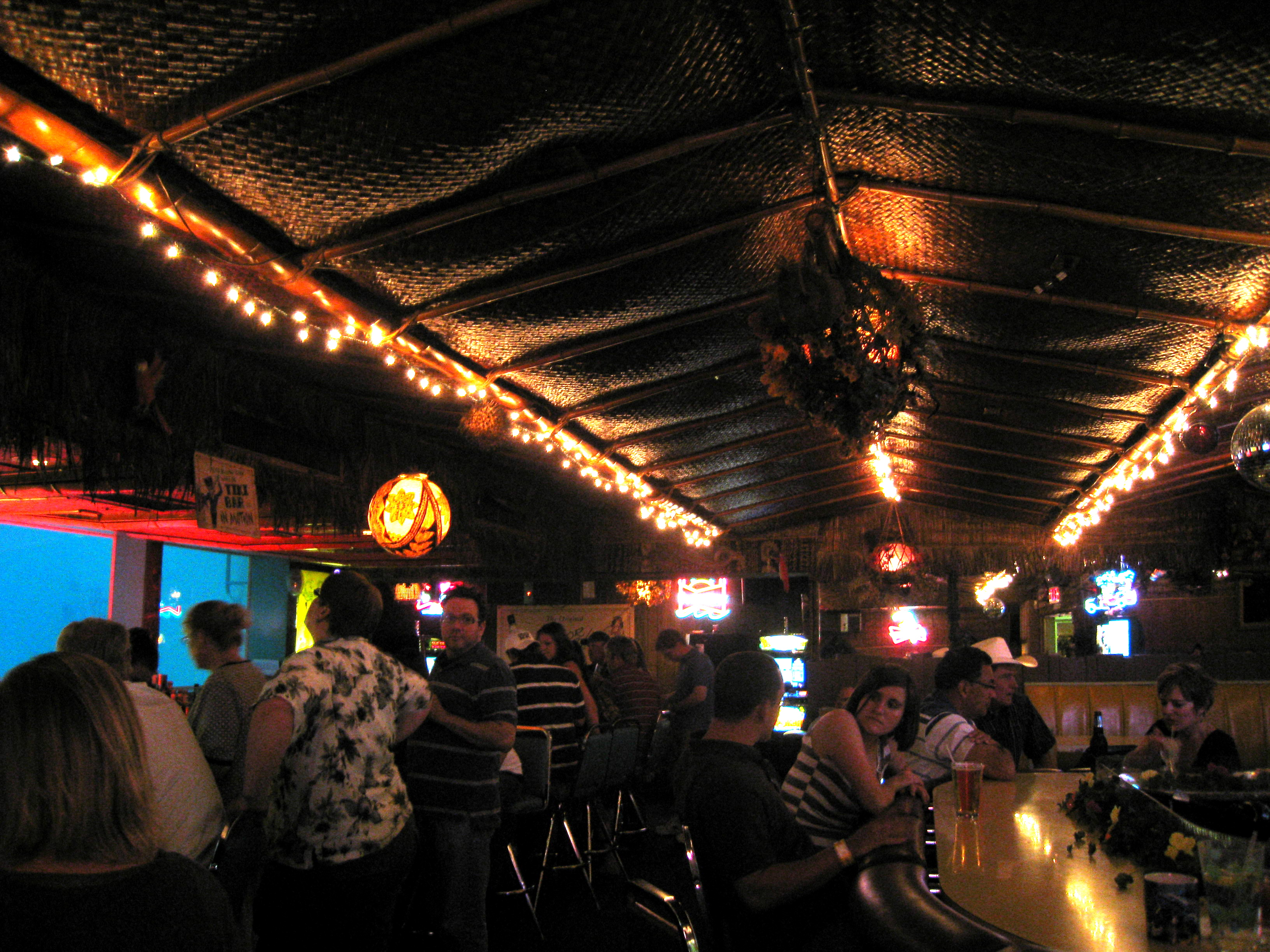
A typical evening at the Sip 'n Dip

The establishment features a glass wall behind the bar looking into an indoor swimming pool where swimmers can be seen under water. It is located inside the O'Haire Motor Inn, which was built in 1962. The concept of a swimming pool designed so that underwater swimmers can be viewed from inside the bar was original to the building, as the person who built the O'Haire had been inspired by a similar design he saw when visiting the Playboy Club in Chicago. When built in the 1960s, the O'Haire Motor Inn was considered "swank" and modern, and the tiki concept was popular, in part due to the then-recent admission of Hawaii to the United States as a state. The tropical theme was also viewed as a fun concept for Montana, a landlocked state with long, cold winters.

Though tiki bars in general declined in popularity in the late 1970s and 1980s until the revival of the style in the 1990s, the Sip 'n Dip survived with few changes. During the 1990s, the idea of having mermaids swim in the pool during evening bar hours was the brainchild of the bar's general manager, Sandra Johnson-Thares, and her mother, who wanted to add a "fun factor". It began with a single "mermaid" in the pool on New Year's Eve in 1995. Today, Johnson-Thares makes the mermaid costumes herself and said, "I never in my life believed the mermaid attraction would be such a big hit. People are fascinated with them, and it's not something you'd expect to see in Montana."

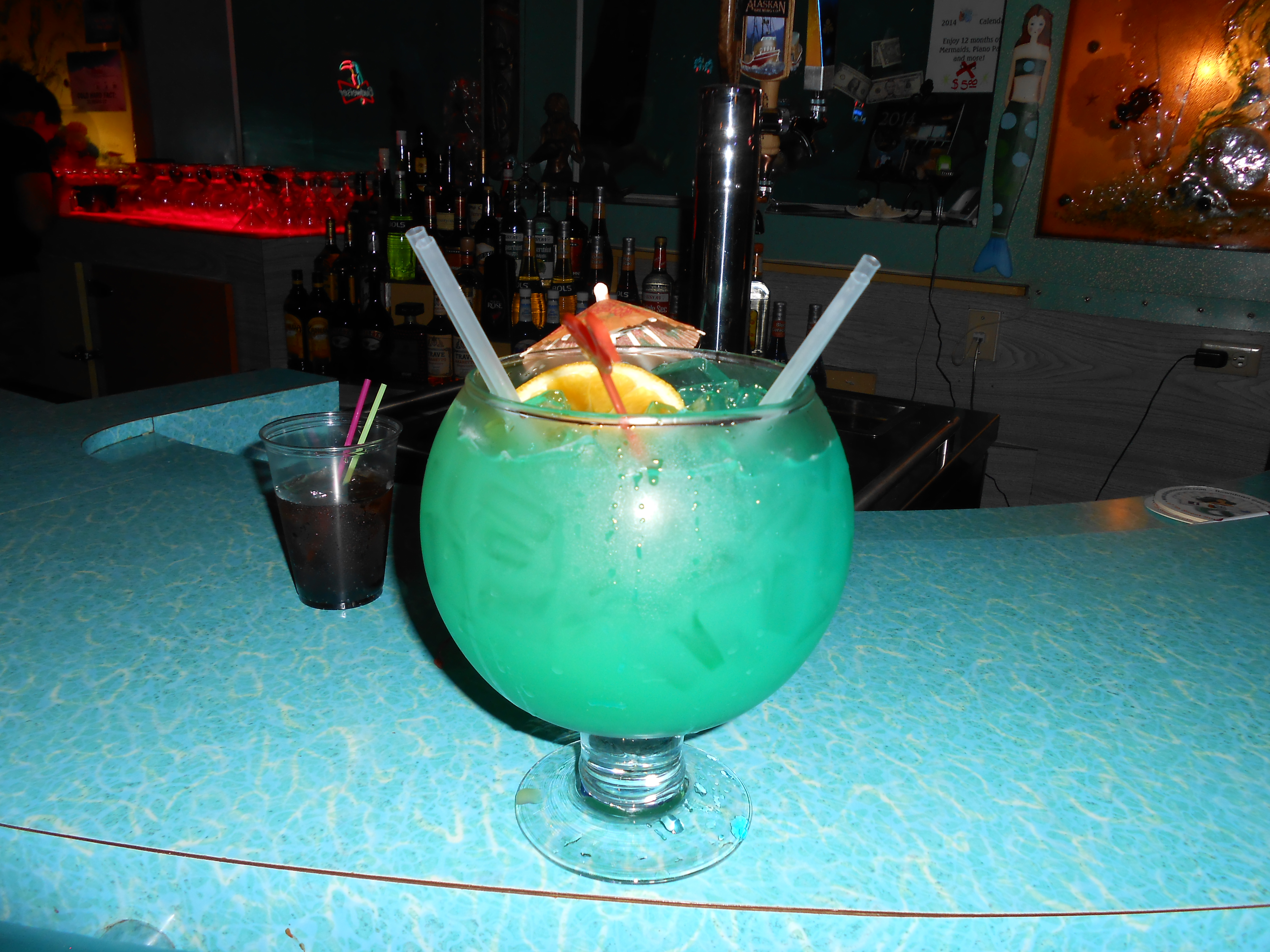
The "fish bowl" cocktail

The bar has a bamboo ceiling, traditional cocktails, local Montana microbrews and specialty drinks such as the "fish bowl", a 64 US fl oz (1.9 L) cocktail that has nine shots of different liquors. It also has an outdoor patio open during the summer, from June to September.

== Entertainment ==
=== Piano Pat ===
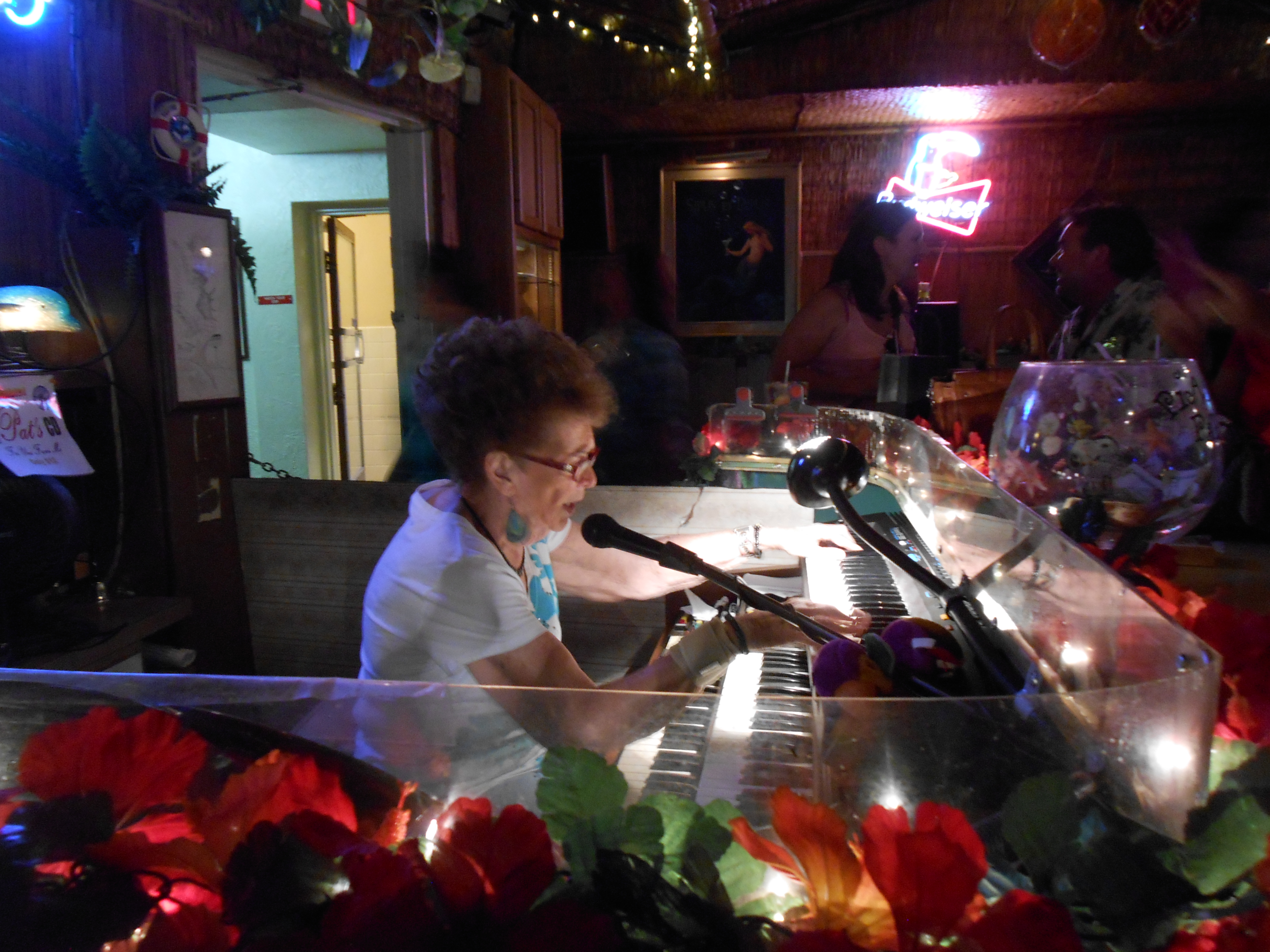
"Piano Pat" at the organ

Live video

Patricia Yvonne "Piano Pat" Sponheim (née Wehr, 1934-2021) played piano at the bar four nights a week for over 50 years. Called "the heart of the Sip 'n Dip", Sponheim was a great-grandmother. She performed what one reviewer described as "unusual covers" of songs, particularly those of Frank Sinatra, Neil Diamond and Elvis Presley. She had a playing style called "jazzy" and a voice described variously as "lived-in", "soulful" and "husky". One of her most requested covers was "Sweet Caroline", where she often led patrons in sing-alongs. Her personal favorite was said to be "Try a Little Tenderness", but in a 2020 interview, she declared her favorite song was Presley's "Can't Help Falling in Love".

Sponheim was originally from Rudyard, Montana, where her family owned an auto supply store. She began playing the piano at age five, when her mother drove her on an 80-mile (130 km) round trip to Havre to take classical piano lessons. By the age of 12, she worked with adults in a dance band, earning $10 per night (equivalent to $165 in 2025). She began singing as well as playing the piano when she lived in Billings, Montana. She was a 28-year-old divorced single mother of three when she started working as the Sip 'n Dip's piano player in 1963, taking the position as a second job in order to support her children. She simultaneously worked as a medical transcriptionist for 38 years before retiring from her day job in 2000.

She celebrated 50 years of employment at the Sip 'n Dip in December 2013 and, at that time, the octogenarian was featured on CBS Sunday Morning. She released two albums, only for sale at the Sip 'n Dip, and though she took requests, she refused to play rock music. In 2018, she was given a "Spirit of Montana" award by Montana's congressional delegation, with her name entered into the Congressional Record with the following tribute by Greg Gianforte: "Mr. Speaker, I rise today to honor a Montana musician known and loved by hundreds of thousands of fans in Montana and across the world. That's no exaggeration, because she has played in one iconic Montana establishment for 55 years."

She continued playing piano her entire life because it was not only a job, but also her social life, saying, "It's a chance to get out of the house. I enjoy the lounge, and it keeps me going."

=== Mermaids and swimming pool ===
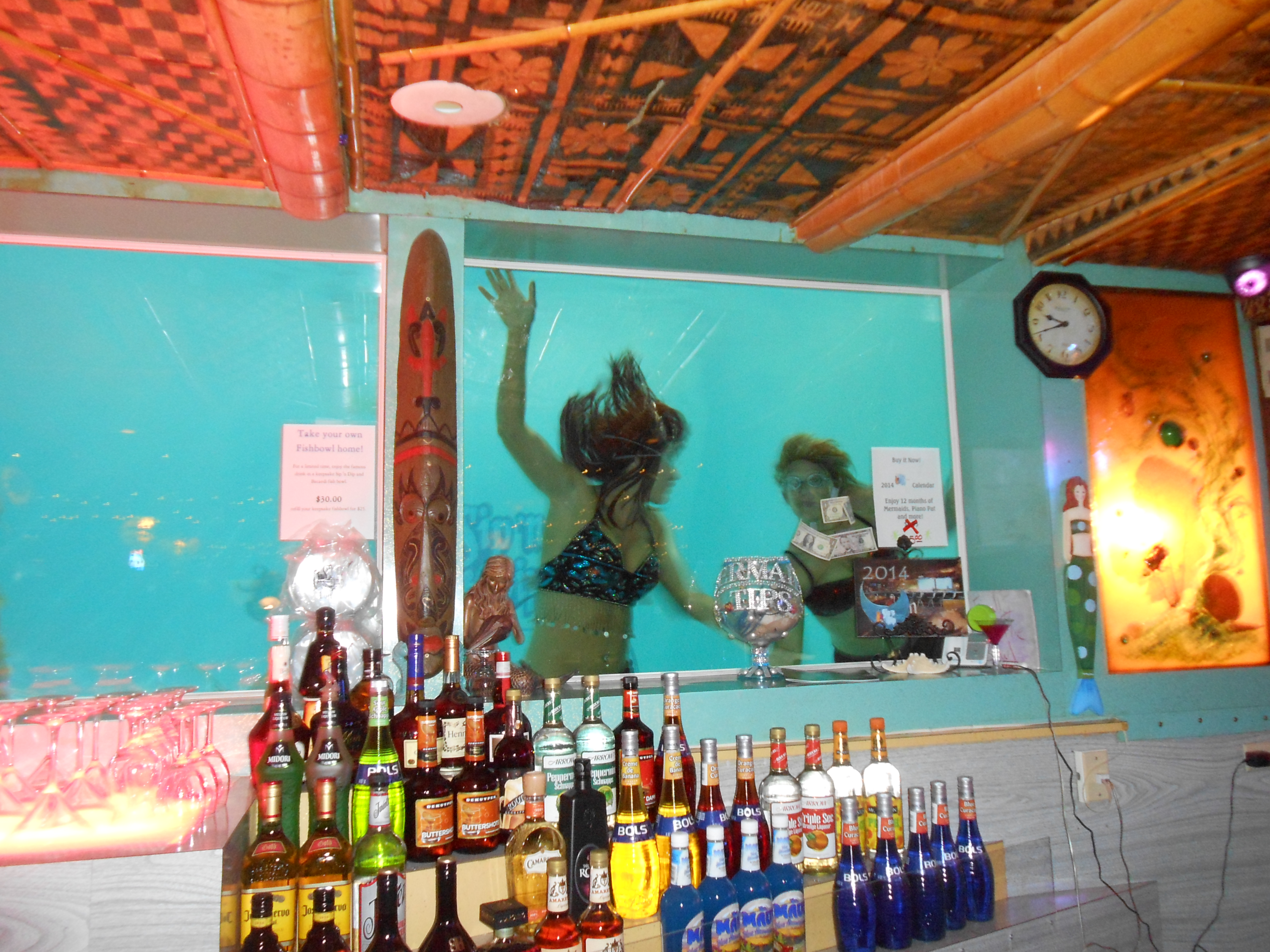
"Mermaids" in the pool

The bar employs six women part-time, who wear mermaid costumes and swim in the pool five evenings a week. They are local women from all walks of life. The "mermaids" explain that it is fairly easy to stay afloat while wearing a mermaid tail, but the difficult part of the job is not floating; staying underwater as much as possible is necessary in order for patrons to see them through the window. Because they cannot use their legs in a traditional manner, they must work harder with their arms to swim. Mermen also swim in the pool. They were hired early on, but fell out of favor by about 2004. In 2016, they were brought back by popular demand, primarily working during the bar's Tuesday ladies' night.

The bar's most famous patrons appeared in 2002, when Daryl Hannah, Anthony Edwards and Nick Nolte visited while working on the movie Northfork, which was filmed in the Great Falls area. Both Nolte, who had starred in The Deep, and Hannah signed the glass window. Then Hannah, who had portrayed a mermaid in Splash, donned a mermaid tail and swam in the pool.

The pool is also open to motel guests, and, in spite of signs warning swimmers that they can be viewed from the bar while swimming, people have been known to skinny dip.

== Recognition ==
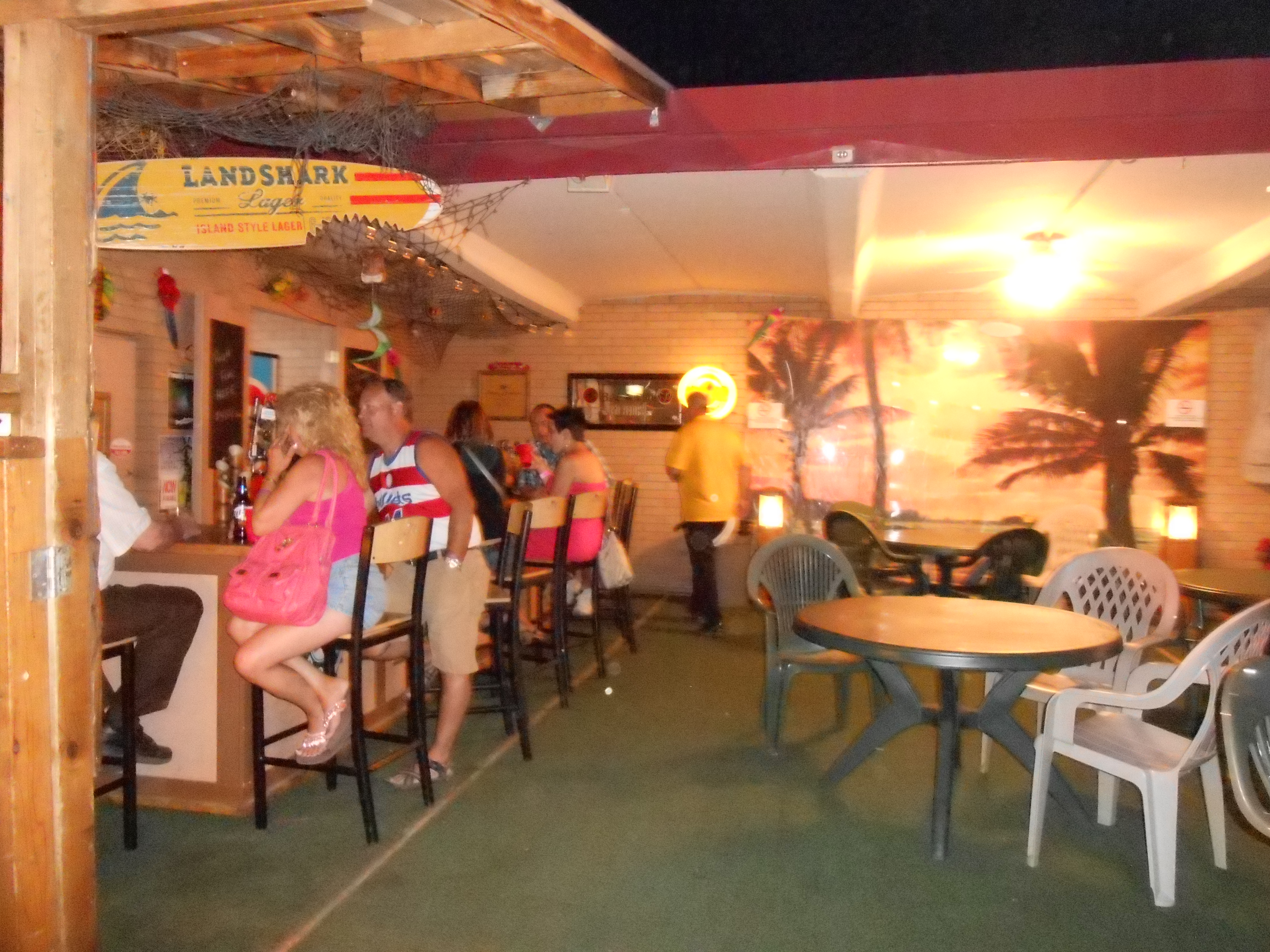
The outdoor patio area, open in the summer

The Sip 'n Dip was called a "Polynesia on the Plains" in 2013 by CBS Sunday Morning. In 2003, the magazine GQ listed the lounge as one of the top ten bars in the world, ranking it as the "#1 bar...worth flying for". Frommer's travel guide calls it "one of the kitschiest, wackiest, and flat-out coolest nightspots, not just in Montana, but in the entire West." In 2014, USA Today ranked the Sip 'n Dip as one of the ten best tiki bars in the United States. In 2016, it came in second to the Club Moderne in Anaconda in a national contest by the National Trust for Historic Preservation for the title "America's Favorite Historic Bar". In 2017, a New York Times article, "Welcome to the Campiest Place on Earth", described it as "kitch-tastic tiki bar". In 2021, Artful Living declared it one of the five most extraordinary bars in the world.

== Incidents ==
The bar faced a major crisis in October 2004 when a crack developed in the glass wall between the bar and the pool, which could have resulted in 22,000 US gallons (83,000 L) of water emptying into the bar. The bar was open when the crack occurred and was noticed immediately. Staff of the O'Haire Inn immediately began draining the pool, which took four hours. The fire department kept its pumper truck standing by in case a more rapid removal of water was needed. The old double-paned glass was replaced with triple-paned glass and, while the repairs were performed, the pool area was given a new rubber coating. The autographs of Nolte and Hannah were lost, as the bar's manager explained, "The crack went right through their signatures."
