= Reno Sales =

- Born: Reno Haber Sales; 1876; Storm Lake, Iowa, U.S.
- Died: 1969 (aged 92–93); Bozeman, Montana, U.S.
- Education: Montana State College (BS); Columbia University (EM)
- Occupations: Geologist; philanthropist
- Employer: Anaconda Copper
- Known for: Father of mining geology

Reno Haber Sales (1876 – 1969) was an American mining engineer who was Chief Geologist of Anaconda Corporation in Montana. He is known as the "father of mining geology."

== Early years ==
Born in 1876 in Storm Lake, Iowa, Sales moved to Montana with his family at a young age and settled at Gallatin Gateway, southwest of Bozeman. His father was an English farmer and his mother was German.

Sales graduated from Gallatin County High School in Bozeman and received a B.S. from Montana State College in 1898. He played on its first-ever football team and was the only member of Montana State's first graduating class. He then earned an Engineer of Mines degree from Columbia School of Mines in New York City in 1900.

== Career ==
Upon graduating from Columbia, Sales returned to Montana at Butte as an engineer for the Boston and Montana Consolidated Copper and Silver Mining Company. In 1901, he joined Anaconda Copper's newly organized Geological Department and became Chief Geologist in 1906 and retired in 1948. As Chief Geologist, his systematic study of ore bodies became the standard practice for the industry, earning him the title of the "father of mining geology." He also successfully defended Anaconda against the lawsuits waged by F. Augustus Heinze, who attempted to discredit and destroy the company. He continued working as a consultant to Anaconda after his retirement and wrote a number of books on the history of mining in Montana, including Underground Warfare at Butte (1964).

Sales was President of the Society of Economic Geologists in 1937 and received the Penrose Medal from the society in 1938. Sales was conferred an Honorary Membership of the American Institute of Mining, Metallurgical, and Petroleum Engineers in 1964. He was inducted into the National Cowboy Hall of Fame in 1967 and the National Mining Hall of Fame in 1990.

Sales received an honorary Dsc. degree from Montana State College in 1935, and he was the namesake of MSU's Reno H. Sales Stadium from 1974 to 1998 after a generous donation. For many years, he was known as "Mr. Bobcat" by fans of the Montana State Bobcats.

== Death ==
In his early nineties, Sales died in 1969 in Bozeman.
