= Bozeman Brewery Historic District =

Historic district in Montana, United States

Coordinates: 45°41′16.21″N 111°1′41.52″W

- U.S. National Register of Historic Places
- U.S. Historic district
- Location within Montana Location within the United States
- Location: 700–800 N. Wallace Avenue, Bozeman, Montana
- Area: 6 acres (2.4 ha)
- Built: 1895
- Architectural style: Bungalow / Craftsman, Queen Anne
- MPS: Bozeman MRA
- NRHP reference No.: 87001844
- Added to NRHP: October 23, 1987

The Bozeman Brewery Historic District, located in Bozeman, Montana, at 700–800 N. Wallace Avenue, consists of five structures, all still closely connected to the Julius Lehrkind family and their Bozeman Brewery business. Lehrkind and his brother, Fred, were brewers who immigrated to America from Germany. Lehrkind and his extended family eventually settled in Bozeman, and the family continues to operate businesses in the Bozeman area. The five structures in this historic district are:

1. the remains of the four-story brick brewery (1895)
2. the Julius Lehrkind Mansion in Queen Anne style architecture (1897)
3. the home of nephew Henry Lehrkind in clapboard style (c. 1908)
4. the home of son Edwin Lehrkind in bungalow style (1912)
5. a one-story brick bottling plant (1925)

The three homes are in one compound at the southern end of the historic district. The two industrial structures, at the northern end, are located across the street from one another. The Julius Lehrkind Mansion is listed as the primary structure and the other four as contributing structures.

== History ==
Julius Lehrkind was a German immigrant who stowed away on a ship at age 17 in 1860 to avoid the German draft. He arrived in New York during the American Civil War and spent most of his first year begging because he did not speak English. With years of brewing experience in his native Germany, he eventually found work in a Philadelphia brewery. In 1868 he inherited some money from his father and moved to Davenport, Iowa, to open a brewery with his brother, Fred, who had come to America with him. There he married Emelie Lambach and had six children. Fred married Emelie's sister, Bertha, and had four children. Fred and Bertha died young, so Julius and Emelie took charge of their children. Emelie died in 1897. Julius married Emelie's niece, Lina Lambach, in 1899 and they had a son. Julius died in 1922. The family has always been active in local civic affairs.

Julius sold his brewery in Iowa and moved to Bozeman in March 1895, bringing his extended family and a crew of experienced brewers with him. He bought the Spieth and Krug Brewery that same year, moved it to the north end of town, and renamed it the Bozeman Brewery. Julius chose Bozeman for its excellent water and the ready availability of a large supply of barley, grown by a group of Dutch farmers in nearby Manhattan, Montana. The brewery was the largest building in Bozeman until 1957, when the Brick Breeden Fieldhouse opened at Montana State University. The brewery was often referred to as "Lehrkind's Genuine Lager Brewery". Three wells underneath the building—one as deep as 200 feet (61 m)—served as a water source. Much of the building was demolished with the advent of Prohibition. During Prohibition, the Lehrkinds ran the Lehrkind Coal and Pure Ice Company out of the building. Upon the repeal of Prohibition in 1932, Edwin brewed "Old Faithful" beer in the brewery for a short time. The building was later used as a creamery and music recording studio.

The brewery building was built with brick and concrete and has window frames made of sandstone and wood. The Lehrkind Mansion has BB pellets in the walls because Julius and his grandson used to hunt mice with BB guns. Built in Queene Anne style, it has Douglas-fir flooring, a corner tower, gables, overhangs, and large windows. Henry's and Edwin's homes are to the south of the mansion. Henry's home is 1.5 stories and built in an irregular pattern. Edwin's home is also 1.5 stories and has a gable front and rectangular plan.

== Other businesses ==
Soon after opening his own brewery in 1895, Lehrkind also entered the soft drink business, making sarsaparilla and lemon soda. In 1914 he was awarded the local Coca-Cola franchise. The brewery went out of business when Prohibition came in 1919, but the Coca-Cola business in still in operation as Lehrkind's Coca-Cola Bottling. The Coca-Cola bottling plant was designed by Fred F. Willson, who was told to build it as cheaply as possible. Willson also designed Eagle's Store in West Yellowstone, Montana, which is also on the National Register of Historic Places.

Lehrkind also opened a brewery in Silesia, Montana, in 1899 and the Red Lodge Brewery, its product marketed as "Montana Bud", in Red Lodge, Montana, in 1910.

When the Lehrkind Mansion was first built, there was only one bathroom for the 13 family members and one servant. The location was chosen for its proximity to the Northern Pacific Railway train depot. The Lehrkind Mansion is now a bed and breakfast, for the second time. At other times it has been a motorcycle repair shop, antique shop, apartment building, and band rehearsal studio.

== See also ==
- National Register of Historic Places listings in Gallatin County, Montana
