= Gallatin County High School (Bozeman, Montana) =

- U.S. National Register of Historic Places
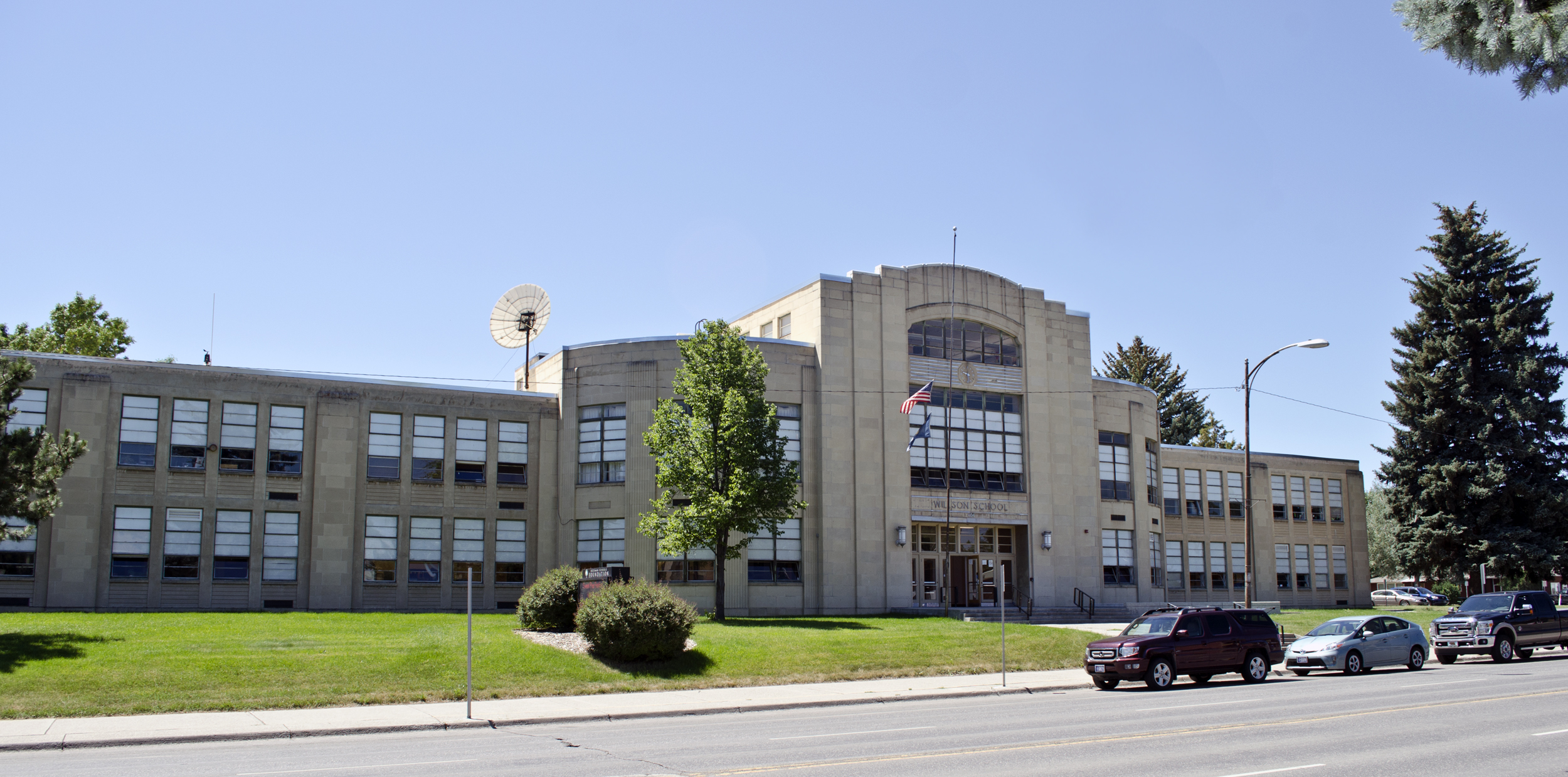
- "Willson School" Art Deco wing

- Location within Montana Location within the United States
- Location: 404 W. Main, Bozeman, Montana
- Coordinates: 45°40′44″N 111°02′33″W
- Area: less than one acre
- Built: 1902, c. 1914, 1936-37
- Architect: George Hancock, Fred F. Willson
- Architectural style: Classical Revival, Romanesque, Art Deco
- MPS: Bozeman MRA
- NRHP reference No.: 87002309
- Added to NRHP: January 22, 1988

The Gallatin County High School was a public high school in Bozeman, Montana. It was built Romanesque/Classical Revival style in 1902, expanded in c. 1914, and gained an Art Deco addition in 1936–37. The c.1914 and 1936-37 work was designed by architect Fred F. Willson; it was renamed Willson School following its conversion to a junior high school.

It includes Classical Revival, Art Deco, and Romanesque architecture. At 404 West Main Street, it was listed on the National Register of Historic Places 38 years ago in 1988.

A 1987 review of the building notes that it "is dominated by a large, rounded, projecting pavilion, which is actually a feature related to the Streamline Moderne style, rather than Art Deco which is the overall style of the building."

GCHS was succeeded by the new Bozeman High School in 1958, located a mile west at 205 North 11th Avenue.

== Notable alumni ==
- Brick Breeden, Montana State basketball coach (and player)
- Gary Cooper, film actor
- Vern Haugland, journalist, war correspondent
- Reno Sales, geologist, "father of mining geology"
