= National Register of Historic Places listings in Gallatin County, Montana =

Location of Gallatin County in Montana

This is a list of the National Register of Historic Places listings in Gallatin County, Montana.

This is intended to be a complete list of the properties and districts on the National Register of Historic Places in Gallatin County, Montana, United States. The locations of National Register properties and districts for which the latitude and longitude coordinates are included below, may be seen in a map.

There are 108 properties and districts listed on the National Register in the county, including 1 National Historic Landmark.

This National Park Service list is complete through NPS recent listings posted October 16, 2026.

== Current listings ==
	Name on the Register	Image	Date listed	Location	City or town	Description
1	Adams Block	Adams Block	May 20, 1999 (#99000597)	123 Main St. 45°53′36″N 111°33′05″W	Three Forks	
2	Airway Radio Station	Airway Radio Station	November 5, 1998 (#98001340)	Three Forks Airport; 45°53′05″N 111°33′45″W	Three Forks	
3	Anderson School	Anderson School	July 21, 1981 (#81000354)	East of Gallatin Gateway; 45°35′53″N 111°06′14″W	Gallatin Gateway	
4	B Bar K Ranch		December 28, 2006 (#06001185)	750 Lone Mountain Ranch Rd. 45°16′38″N 111°19′32″W	Big Sky	Also called the Lone Mountain Ranch
5	R.T. Barnett and Company Building	R.T. Barnett and Company Building	December 1, 1980 (#80002416)	13 E. Main St. 45°40′43″N 111°02′12″W	Bozeman	
6	Jack Bartlett House	Jack Bartlett House	February 4, 2000 (#00000046)	8 W. Harrison; 45°40′08″N 111°02′59″W	Bozeman	
7	Beall Park Community Center	Beall Park Community Center	October 23, 1987 (#87001807)	409 N. Bozeman; 45°41′02″N 111°02′03″W	Bozeman	
8	Belgrade City Hall and Jail	Belgrade City Hall and Jail	October 25, 1982 (#82000592)	Broadway at Northern Pacific Boulevard; 45°46′33″N 111°10′33″W	Belgrade	
9	Blackmore Apartments	Blackmore Apartments	July 7, 1983 (#83001062)	120 S. Black St. 45°40′41″N 111°02′00″W	Bozeman	
10	Bohart House	Bohart House	October 23, 1987 (#87001810)	510 N. Church; 45°41′07″N 111°01′42″W	Bozeman	
11	Bon Ton Historic District	Bon Ton Historic District	October 23, 1987 (#87001816)	Roughly bounded by Olive St., Willson Ave., Cleveland St., and 4th Ave. 45°40′38″N 111°02′36″W	Bozeman	
12	Bozeman Armory	Bozeman Armory	October 22, 1987 (#87001800)	24 W. Mendenhall; 45°40′49″N 111°02′14″W	Bozeman	
13	Bozeman Brewery Historic District	Bozeman Brewery Historic District	October 23, 1987 (#87001844)	700-800 N. Wallace Ave. 45°41′17″N 111°01′39″W	Bozeman	
14	Bozeman Carnegie Library	Bozeman Carnegie Library	February 2, 1979 (#79001402)	35 N. Bozeman Ave. 45°40′49″N 111°02′04″W	Bozeman	
15	Bozeman National Fish Hatchery	Bozeman National Fish Hatchery	January 6, 1983 (#83001063)	4050 Bridger Canyon Rd. 45°41′55″N 110°58′41″W	Bozeman	
16	Bozeman Sheet Metal Works	Bozeman Sheet Metal Works	October 23, 1987 (#87001836)	26 S. Grand; 45°40′44″N 111°02′20″W	Bozeman	
17	Bozeman YMCA	Bozeman YMCA	October 23, 1987 (#87001819)	6 W. Babcock; 45°40′42″N 111°02′14″W	Bozeman	
18	Brandenburg House	Brandenburg House	October 23, 1987 (#87001804)	122 W. Lamme; 45°40′51″N 111°02′20″W	Bozeman	
19	Bridger Arms Apartments	Bridger Arms Apartments	October 23, 1987 (#87001799)	103-111 S. 4th Ave. 45°40′41″N 111°02′30″W	Bozeman	
20	Busch House	Busch House	October 23, 1987 (#87001805)	224 N. Church; 45°41′02″N 111°01′44″W	Bozeman	
21	Buttelman Ranch	Buttelman Ranch	April 19, 1993 (#93000309)	Address restricted	Willow Creek	
22	Colburn House	Colburn House	October 23, 1987 (#87001813)	607 W. Lamme; 45°40′51″N 111°02′39″W	Bozeman	
23	Cooper Park Historic District	Cooper Park Historic District	October 23, 1987 (#87001845)	200-700 blocks of S. 5th, 6th, 7th, 8th, and Cross Sts. 45°40′31″N 111°02′40″W	Bozeman	
24	Cottonwood School	Cottonwood School	July 21, 1981 (#81000356)	Southeast of Gallatin Gateway; 45°38′00″N 111°07′35″W	Gallatin Gateway	
25	Crail Ranch Buildings	Crail Ranch Buildings	April 15, 1982 (#82003167)	Meadow Village; 45°16′07″N 111°19′11″W	Big Sky	
26	Dokken-Nelson Funeral Home	Dokken-Nelson Funeral Home	December 21, 1987 (#87001833)	113 S. Willson; 45°40′42″N 111°02′19″W	Bozeman	
27	Dry Creek School	Dry Creek School	July 21, 1981 (#81000360)	East of Manhattan; 45°52′28″N 111°13′27″W	Manhattan	
28	Eagle's Store	Eagle's Store	November 6, 1986 (#86002957)	3 Canyon St. 44°39′34″N 111°05′53″W	West Yellowstone	
29	Elkhorn Ranch Historic District		April 5, 2016 (#16000142)	33133 Gallatin Rd. 45°04′04″N 111°11′22″W	Gallatin Gateway vicinity	
30	Emerson School	Emerson School	August 10, 1990 (#90001212)	111 S. Grand Ave. 45°40′42″N 111°02′22″W	Bozeman	
31	Federal Building and US Post Office-Bozeman	Federal Building and US Post Office-Bozeman	April 26, 2018 (#100002362)	10 E. Babcock St. 45°40′41″N 111°02′10″W	Bozeman	
32	First Baptist Church	First Baptist Church	October 23, 1987 (#87001803)	120 S. Grand; 45°40′40″N 111°02′21″W	Bozeman	
33	First Presbyterian Church	First Presbyterian Church	December 21, 1987 (#87001820)	26 W. Babcock; 45°40′41″N 111°02′16″W	Bozeman	
34	Burr Fisher House	Burr Fisher House	March 28, 1985 (#85000643)	712 S. Willson Ave. 45°40′18″N 111°02′16″W	Bozeman	
35	Flaming Arrow Lodge		July 29, 1994 (#94000784)	15521 Bridger Canyon Rd. 45°48′34″N 110°53′03″W	Bozeman	
36	Flaming Arrow Ranch House and Office		March 12, 1998 (#98000229)	15325 Bridger Canyon Rd. 45°48′31″N 110°52′58″W	Bozeman	
37	Gallatin County Courthouse	Gallatin County Courthouse	December 21, 1987 (#87001794)	301 W. Main; 45°40′47″N 111°02′28″W	Bozeman	
38	Gallatin County High School	Gallatin County High School	January 22, 1988 (#87002309)	404 W. Main; 45°40′44″N 111°02′30″W	Bozeman	
39	Gallatin County Jail	Gallatin County Jail	January 19, 1983 (#83001064)	317 W. Main St. 45°40′47″N 111°02′30″W	Bozeman	
40	Gallatin Gateway Inn	Gallatin Gateway Inn	January 24, 1980 (#80002417)	U.S. Route 191; 45°35′37″N 111°11′54″W	Gallatin Gateway	
41	Gallatin Valley Seed Company	Gallatin Valley Seed Company	October 23, 1987 (#87001830)	209 S. Wallace; 45°40′38″N 111°01′42″W	Bozeman	
42	Gifford House	Gifford House	October 23, 1987 (#87001802)	112 S. Grand; 45°40′41″N 111°02′21″W	Bozeman	Location is currently a parking lot.
43	Graf Building	Graf Building	October 22, 1987 (#87001811)	219-221 W. Arthur; 45°40′08″N 111°02′25″W	Bozeman	
44	Green Ranch	Green Ranch	April 19, 1993 (#93000310)	Address restricted	Willow Creek	
45	Jesse R. Green Homestead		January 21, 1992 (#91001939)	6 miles northeast of Trident; 45°59′05″N 111°22′09″W	Trident	
46	Hamill Apartments	Hamill Apartments	October 23, 1987 (#87001817)	427 E. Main; 45°40′46″N 111°01′51″W	Bozeman	
47	Hamill House	Hamill House	October 23, 1987 (#87001814)	205 S. Church; 45°40′38″N 111°01′49″W	Bozeman	
48	Harris House	Harris House	January 22, 1988 (#87002310)	502 W. Mendenhall; 45°40′49″N 111°02′35″W	Bozeman	
49	Hines House	Hines House	January 22, 1988 (#87002311)	420 W. College; 45°40′16″N 111°02′33″W	Bozeman	
50	Holy Rosary Church Rectory	Holy Rosary Church Rectory	October 23, 1987 (#87001801)	220 W. Main; 45°40′44″N 111°02′23″W	Bozeman	
51	Hotel Baxter	Hotel Baxter	April 19, 1984 (#84002469)	105 W. Main St. 45°40′46″N 111°04′37″W	Bozeman	
52	House at 22 West Lamme	House at 22 West Lamme	October 23, 1987 (#87001806)	22 W. Lamme; 45°40′51″N 111°02′14″W	Bozeman	
53	House at 714 North Tracy	House at 714 North Tracy	January 22, 1988 (#87002315)	714 N. Tracy; 45°41′18″N 111°02′09″W	Bozeman	
54	House at 818 South Eighth	House at 818 South Eighth	January 22, 1988 (#87002318)	818 S. 8th 45°40′15″N 111°02′02″W	Bozeman	
55	Johnson House	Johnson House	January 22, 1988 (#87002321)	506 N. Bozeman; 45°41′02″N 111°15′51″W	Bozeman	
56	Kennedy Building	Kennedy Building	May 13, 1983 (#83001065)	127 Yellowstone Ave. 44°39′34″N 111°05′59″W	West Yellowstone	
57	Emil Ketterer House	Emil Ketterer House	March 31, 1983 (#83001066)	35 N. Grand Ave. 45°40′49″N 111°02′21″W	Bozeman	
58	Kolble House	Kolble House	October 23, 1987 (#87001812)	716 S. Black; 45°40′22″N 111°02′05″W	Bozeman	
59	Samuel Lewis House	Samuel Lewis House	March 18, 1999 (#99000342)	308 S. Bozeman Ave. 45°40′33″N 111°01′59″W	Bozeman	
60	Lindley Place Historic District	Lindley Place Historic District	October 23, 1987 (#87001842)	200-300 Lindley Pl. 45°40′36″N 111°01′57″W	Bozeman	
61	Litening Gas	Litening Gas	October 22, 1987 (#87001843)	424 E. Main; 45°40′45″N 111°01′50″W	Bozeman	
62	Little Bear School	Little Bear School	April 15, 1982 (#82003168)	Bear Creek Rd. 45°32′46″N 111°09′55″W	Gallatin Gateway	Moved to Gallatin Gateway in 1990s. 45.58983°N 111.19644°W
63	Lonesomehurst Cabin	Lonesomehurst Cabin	August 18, 2011 (#11000541)	Lonesomehurst Residential Residence Blk. A., Lot 1. 44°44′12″N 111°13′59″W	West Yellowstone	
64	Lower Bridger School	Lower Bridger School	July 21, 1981 (#81000347)	East of Bozeman; 45°42′11″N 110°55′44″W	Bozeman	
65	Lower Willow Creek Rural Historic Landscape District	Lower Willow Creek Rural Historic Landscape District	April 19, 1993 (#93000311)	Address restricted	Willow Creek	
66	Charles Lundwall Building	Charles Lundwall Building	January 4, 2001 (#00001611)	123-125 W. Main St. 45°40′53″N 111°02′22″W	Bozeman	
67	Madison Buffalo Jump State Monument	Madison Buffalo Jump State Monument	April 28, 1970 (#70000356)	7 miles south of Logan; 45°47′39″N 111°27′42″W	Logan	
68	Madison Hotel and Cafe	Madison Hotel and Cafe	May 13, 1983 (#83001067)	137 Yellowstone Ave. 44°39′30″N 111°06′00″W	West Yellowstone	
69	Main Street Historic District	Main Street Historic District	December 21, 1987 (#87001848)	100 block of W. Main through the 300 block of E. Main; 45°40′47″N 111°02′05″W	Bozeman	
70	Malmborg School	Malmborg School	July 21, 1981 (#81000349)	East of Bozeman; 45°40′20″N 110°50′06″W	Bozeman	
71	Maudlow School		August 23, 1982 (#82003164)	Milwaukee Rd. 46°06′27″N 111°10′17″W	Belgrade	
72	Methodist Episcopal Church	Methodist Episcopal Church	October 23, 1987 (#87001839)	121 S. Willson; 45°40′41″N 111°02′19″W	Bozeman	
73	Methodist Episcopal Church	Methodist Episcopal Church	December 28, 2000 (#00001566)	116 Cedar St. 45°53′43″N 111°33′00″W	Three Forks	
74	MISCO Grain Elevator	MISCO Grain Elevator	October 23, 1987 (#87001831)	700 N. Wallace; 45°41′15″N 111°01′37″W	Bozeman	
75	Montana State University Historic District	Montana State University Historic District	December 24, 2013 (#13000972)	Roughly bounded by W. College & W. Grant Sts., S. 11th & S. 6th Aves. 45°40′03″N 111°02′58″W	Bozeman	
76	Newman House	Newman House	October 23, 1987 (#87001835)	216 N. Church; 45°41′01″N 111°01′44″W	Bozeman	
77	North Tracy Avenue Historic District	North Tracy Avenue Historic District	October 23, 1987 (#87001846)	300-500 blocks of N. Tracy Ave., Bozeman, and Montana; 45°41′04″N 111°02′12″W	Bozeman	
78	Northern Pacific-Story Mill Historic District	Northern Pacific-Story Mill Historic District	May 10, 1996 (#96000479)	Roughly bounded by the Northern Pacific right-of-way and the Story Mill spur line from Wye to Bridger Canyon Rd. 45°41′30″N 111°01′16″W	Bozeman	
79	Panton House	Panton House	October 23, 1987 (#87001828)	801 S. 7th 45°40′17″N 111°02′00″W	Bozeman	
80	Pass Creek School	Pass Creek School	July 21, 1981 (#81000341)	Northeast of Belgrade; 45°58′40″N 111°05′52″W	Belgrade	
81	Peterson House	Peterson House	January 22, 1988 (#87002350)	216 N. Wallace; 45°41′00″N 111°01′42″W	Bozeman	
82	Peterson Place	Peterson Place	April 19, 1993 (#93000308)	Address restricted	Willow Creek	
83	Pine Butte School	Pine Butte School	July 21, 1981 (#81000351)	West of Bozeman; 45°40′14″N 111°14′54″W	Bozeman	
84	Thomas Quaw House		March 4, 1991 (#91000217)	5 Central Ave. 45°46′36″N 111°10′27″W	Belgrade	Moved to 5835 Spaulding Bridge Rd. City Hall is now on the original site. 45.89577°N 111.24263°W
85	Rea School		July 21, 1981 (#81000346)	West of Bozeman; 45°40′19″N 111°07′27″W	Bozeman	Structure is not located at mapped site.
86	Reese Creek School	Reese Creek School	July 21, 1981 (#81000342)	Northeast of Belgrade; 45°52′33″N 111°04′48″W	Belgrade	One-room schoolhouse with a cupola, built in 1906.
87	Rouse House	Rouse House	October 23, 1987 (#87001832)	506 E. Babcock; 45°40′41″N 111°01′44″W	Bozeman	
88	Ruby Theatre	Ruby Theatre	April 30, 1982 (#82003169)	212 Main St. 45°53′35″N 111°33′06″W	Three Forks	
89	Sacajawea Hotel	Sacajawea Hotel	January 24, 1980 (#80002418)	5 Main St. 45°53′44″N 111°33′03″W	Three Forks	
90	Sedan School	Sedan School	July 21, 1981 (#81000344)	Northeast of Belgrade; 45°57′30″N 110°51′03″W	Belgrade	
91	Shenango Work Station		September 1, 2022 (#100008100)	Custer Gallatin NF Storm Castle Rd. 45°27′26″N 111°14′39″W	Gallatin Gateway vicinity	
92	South Tracy Avenue Historic District	South Tracy Avenue Historic District	October 23, 1987 (#87001847)	802-824 S. Tracy Ave. 45°40′16″N 111°02′14″W	Bozeman	
93	South Tracy-South Black Historic District	South Tracy-South Black Historic District	December 21, 1987 (#87001840)	200-600 blocks of S. Tracy and S. Black Aves. 45°40′31″N 111°02′11″W	Bozeman	
94	South Willson Historic District	South Willson Historic District	December 18, 1978 (#78001687)	Willson Ave. between Curtiss and Arthur Sts. 45°40′21″N 111°02′19″W	Bozeman	
95	Spanish Creek School		July 21, 1981 (#81000358)	Northwest of Gallatin Gateway; 45°29′27″N 111°19′50″W	Gallatin Gateway	
96	Spieth and Krug Brewery	Spieth and Krug Brewery	April 19, 1984 (#84002473)	238-246 E. Main St. 45°40′54″N 111°01′53″W	Bozeman	
97	Spieth Houses	Spieth Houses	October 23, 1987 (#87001838)	204 N. Bozeman and 209 E. Lamme; 45°40′55″N 111°01′59″W	Bozeman	
98	Springhill School	Springhill School	July 21, 1981 (#81000345)	Northeast of Belgrade; 45°50′21″N 111°02′04″W	Belgrade	
99	St. James Episcopal Church and Rectory	St. James Episcopal Church and Rectory	October 23, 1987 (#87001841)	9 W. Olive; 45°40′40″N 111°02′12″W	Bozeman	
100	Stateler Memorial Methodist Church	Stateler Memorial Methodist Church	July 29, 2008 (#08000757)	303 Main St. 45°49′32″N 111°38′42″W	Willow Creek	
101	Story Motor Company		October 23, 1987 (#87001837)	202 W. Main; 45°40′47″N 111°02′21″W	Bozeman	Replaced by mixed retail-residential structure.
102	Three Forks of the Missouri	Three Forks of the Missouri	October 15, 1966 (#66000433)	Northeast of Three Forks on the Missouri River, at Missouri Headwaters State Monument; 45°55′48″N 111°30′00″W	Three Forks	
103	Three Valleys State Bank	Three Valleys State Bank	April 11, 2005 (#05000256)	202 Main St. 45°53′35″N 111°33′07″W	Three Forks	
104	Trident School		July 21, 1981 (#81000364)	South of Trident; 45°56′58″N 111°28′24″W	Trident	
105	Upper Madison School	Upper Madison School	January 19, 1983 (#83001068)	Buffalo Jump Rd. 45°44′38″N 111°28′07″W	Three Forks	
106	Watkins Creek Ranch		December 27, 2006 (#06001180)	1207 Firehole Ranch Rd. 44°48′49″N 111°17′20″W	West Yellowstone	
107	West Yellowstone Oregon Shortline Terminus Historic District	West Yellowstone Oregon Shortline Terminus Historic District	April 13, 1983 (#83001069)	Yellowstone Ave. 44°39′30″N 111°06′06″W	West Yellowstone	
108	Westgate Village Shopping Center	Westgate Village Shopping Center	August 9, 2024 (#100010714)	1003, 1005, 1007, 1009, 1011 West College Street; 45°40′17″N 111°03′04″W	Bozeman	

== See also ==
- List of National Historic Landmarks in Montana
- National Register of Historic Places listings in Montana
