= Spieth =

Spieth is a surname. Notable people with the surname include:

- Herman Spieth (1905–1988), American zoologist and university administrator
- Jacob Spieth, founder of Spieth and Krug Brewery
- Jordan Spieth (born 1993), American golfer

== See also ==
- Spieth and Krug Brewery, also known as "Union Hall" and "Maxey Block", a brewery established in 1867 in Bozeman, Montana, by two German immigrants, Jacob Spieth and Charles Krug
