= Airway Radio Station =

- U.S. National Register of Historic Places
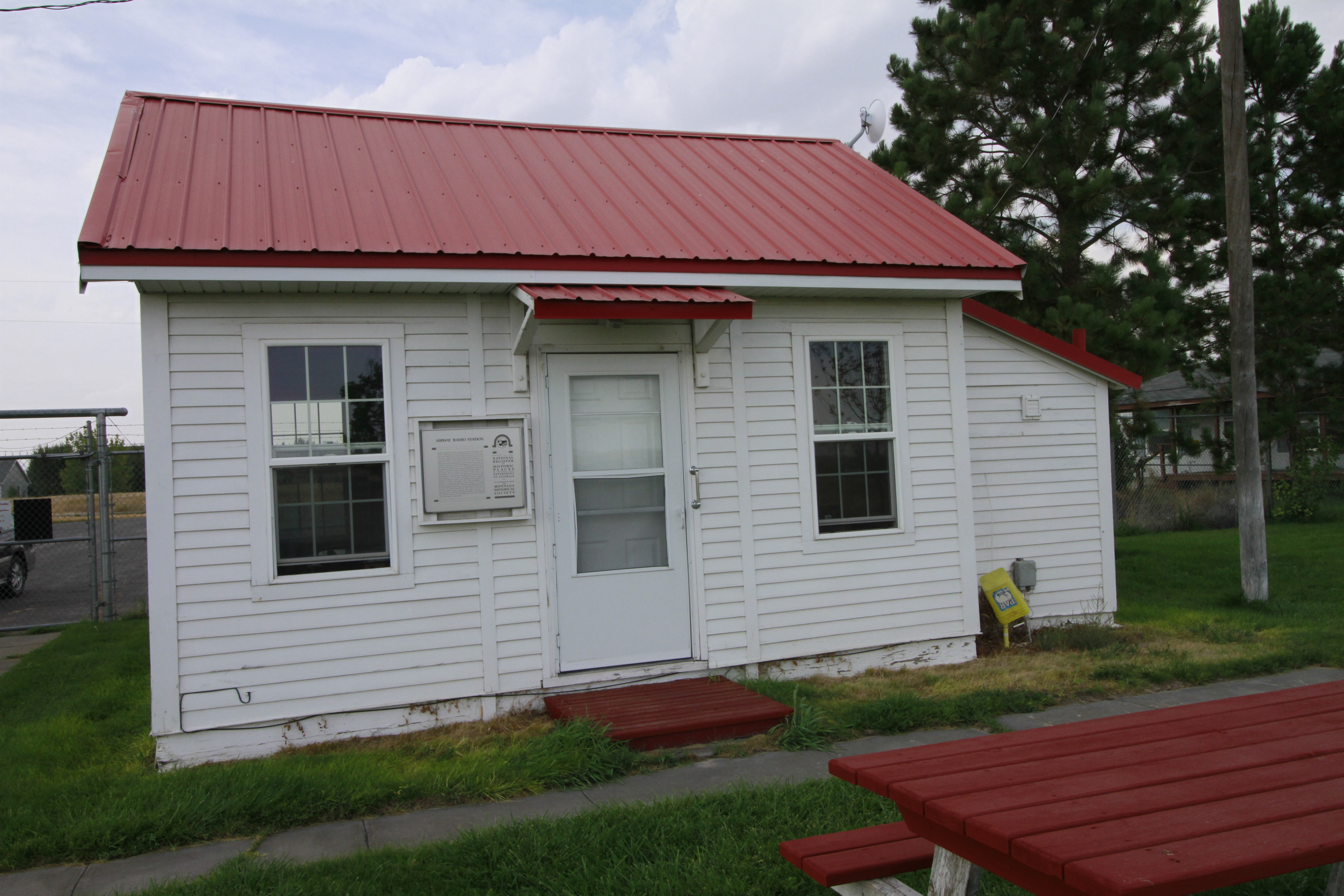
- Airway Radio Station in 2017

- Location within Montana Location within the United States
- Location: Three Forks Airport
- Nearest city: Three Forks, Montana
- Coordinates: 45°53′05″N 111°33′45″W
- Area: less than one acre
- Built: 1933
- Architectural style: Bungalow/craftsman
- NRHP reference No.: 98001340
- Added to NRHP: November 5, 1998

The Airway Radio Station in Gallatin County, Montana was built by the Aeronautics Bureau of the U.S. Department of Commerce in 1933. Located on Pogreba Field at Three Forks Airport, the radio station was part of a series of federally-constructed airway stations built during the early years of U.S. civil aviation. The station housed the radio range and ground-to-air radio systems that aided airmail pilots flying on the Minneapolis-Spokane-Seattle civil airway. The station was moved from its original location at Seifert Field, near Belgrade, Montana, to Pogreba Field in 1953, where it now serves as a terminal at Three Forks Airport. The Airway Radio Station was listed on the National Register of Historic Places on November 5, 1998.

== Inscription on the National Register of Historic Places ==
In 1935, Northwest Airlines gained federal approval to provide the state of Montana with air service, as part of the Minneapolis to Seattle route. A series of radio broadcast stations, airway beacons, and intermediate fields located every fifty miles assisted pilots in flying this route. The Airway Station at Seifert and Pogreba Fields is "one of two extant examples of an Airway Radio Station in Montana" and provided "critical services necessary for the development of civil aviation." Thus, it was inscribed on to the National Register of Historic Places based on Criterion A ("the property must make a contribution to the major pattern of American history") due to its contribution to airmail service in the United States and association with radio technology, and Criterion B ("concerns the distinctive characteristics of the building by its architecture and construction, including having great artistic value or being the work of a master.") due to the station's status of one of the few surviving airway radio stations in the U.S.

== See also ==
- National Register of Historic Places in Gallatin County, Montana
