= Dean A. Pogreba =

United States Air Force officer

Dean Andrew Pogreba
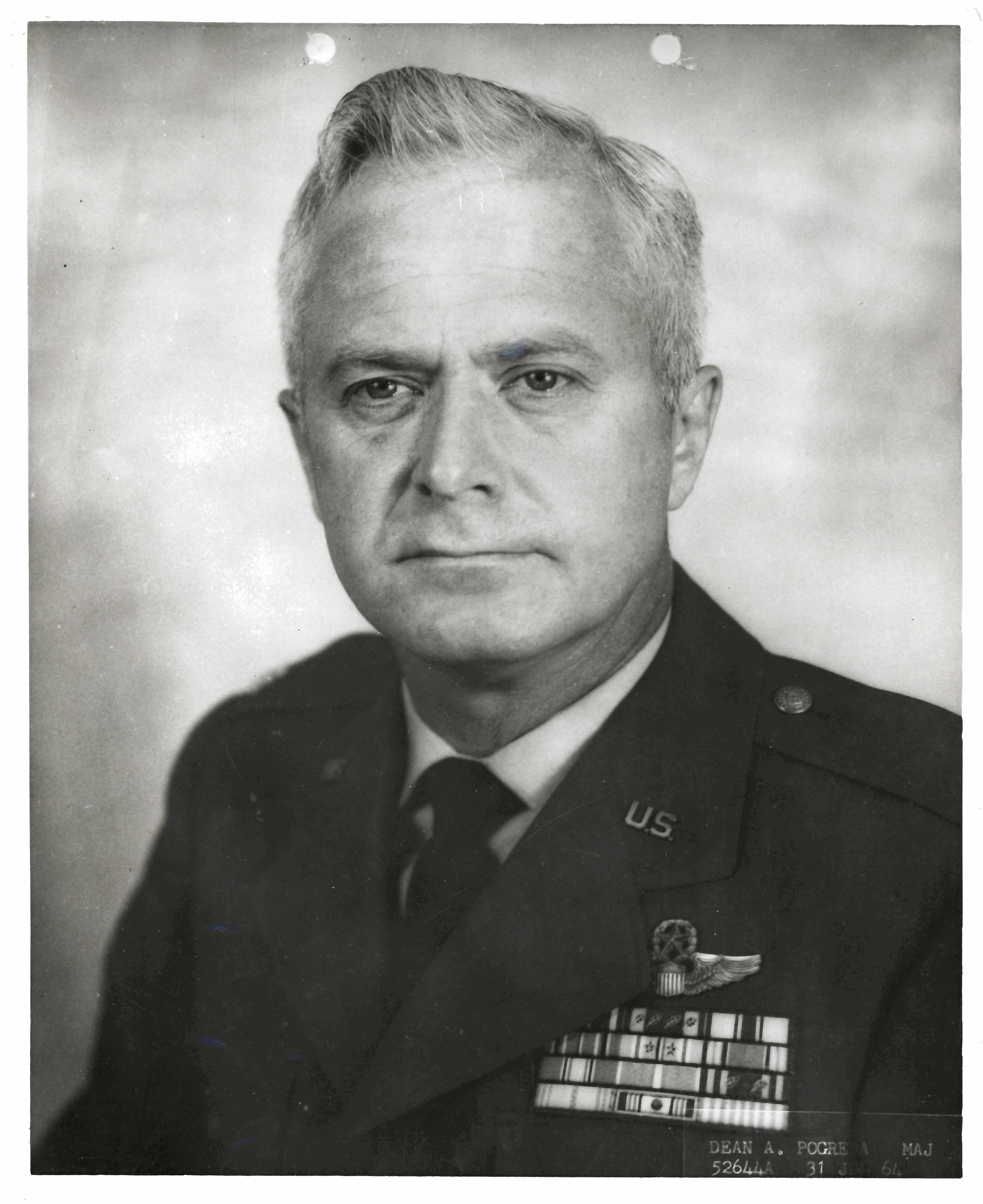
- Born: 16 March 1922; Three Forks, Montana
- Died: 5 October 1965 (aged 43); Lạng Sơn province, North Vietnam
- Military career
- Allegiance: United States of America
- Branch: United States Air Force
- Service years: 1944-1965
- Rank: Colonel
- Nickname: Pogie
- Conflicts: World War II; Korean War; Vietnam War †
- Awards: Air Force Cross; Distinguished Flying Cross (2)

Colonel Dean Andrew Pogreba (16 March 1922 - 5 October 1965) was a United States Air Force (USAF) officer.

== Early life and education ==
He was born on 16 March 1922 in Three Forks, Montana.

== Military career ==
He joined the United States Army Air Force and qualified as a pilot in 1944. He was assigned to the China Burma India theater and flew the Curtiss C-46 Commando. On his return to the US he left the active service and joined the Montana Air National Guard.

During the Korean War he served with the 4th Fighter-Interceptor Wing flying the North American F-86 Sabre and was twice awarded the Distinguished Flying Cross for aerial combat.

During the Vietnam War he was a member of the 36th Tactical Fighter Squadron on temporary duty to Korat Royal Thai Air Force Base. Thailand.

On 22 August 1965 he was flying a Republic F-105D Thunderchief (#62-4235) on a combat mission approximately 25 miles (40 km) west of Thanh Hóa, North Vietnam, when he was hit by antiaircraft fire and ejected. He was rescued by a USAF CH-3C (#63-9676) (later known as the Black Mariah), operated by Detachment 1, 38th Air Rescue Squadron.

On 5 October 1965, he was the pilot of F-105D (#62-4295) on a combat mission over Lạng Sơn province, North Vietnam. After completing his attack run in dense cloud cover, he made radio contact in the vicinity of 48Q XJ401786 (21.505°N 106.352°E) and reported he was departing the area for a rendezvous point on the coast. However, he never arrived at the rendezvous point, and radio contact with him could not be reestablished. Other pilots flying the mission reported last seeing his aircraft rolling off target amid heavy anti-aircraft fire, and that at least three surface-to-air missiles detonated at the time. Visual and electronic searches for him were unsuccessful, and enemy presence in the area precluded any ground searches. Further attempts to locate him were unsuccessful. After the incident, the USAF promoted him to the rank of colonel. He was posthumously awarded the Air Force Cross for the mission.

== Memorials ==
He is memorialized on the Courts of the Missing at the National Memorial Cemetery of the Pacific. His name is also inscribed on the Vietnam Veterans Memorial in Washington, DC.

In May 1971 the Three Forks Airport was renamed Pogreba Field Airport in his honor. In 1995 a granite memorial was dedicated to him at the airport.

His widow Maxine wrote a book about him titled Pogie 105, ISBN 978-1505482591, released in 2014.

== Decorations ==
His military decorations and awards include the Air Force Cross and Distinguished Flying Cross with oak leaf cluster.
