= Lonesomehurst Cabin =

Historic house in Montana, United States

- Lonesomehurst cabin
- U.S. National Register of Historic Places
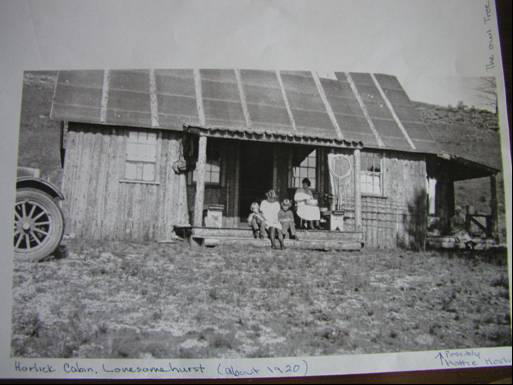
- The original Lonesomehurst Cabin, 1920

- Location within Montana
- Location: Hebgen Lake
- Coordinates: 44°44′12″N 111°13′9″W
- Area: 0.73 acres (0.30 ha)
- Built: 1919
- Architectural style: Log
- NRHP reference No.: 11000541
- Added to NRHP: August 18, 2011

Lonesomehurst Cabin is a log cabin style recreational residence on the west side of the South Fork Arm of Hebgen Lake near West Yellowstone, in Gallatin County, Montana. Hebgen Lake is on the Madison River. There are three buildings on the site: a wood-frame cabin constructed circa 1919, a log boathouse built in 1958, and a wood frame outhouse built about 1930. The cabin is at the south end of the site, which is 8 miles (13 km) west of West Yellowstone and the entrance to Yellowstone National Park.

== Description ==
The cabin sits among fir trees and was originally built 1919–1920 and remodeled in 1932–33, 1939, and 1973. It is a 1 1/2 story building with stone steps and a concrete stoop at the door. There is a fish motif rock mosaic, picnic area, and a row of rocks surrounds the cabin on three sides. Its dimensions are 30 feet (9.1 m) north/south by 33 feet (10 m) east/west. It has a steep gable roof with asphalt shingles. The exterior has 1950s-era log cabin-appearing lap wood with rabbetted cornerboards. There are three bedrooms, a dining room, a bathroom—added in 1973, a screened in porch, and enclosed shed. The furniture is made of rustic wood. Several examples of fish art adorn the walls.

The outhouse is 4 by 5 feet (1.2 m × 1.5 m), plank board walls, rolled roofing, and has no foundation. It is northwest of the cabin. The boathouse is 13 by 23 feet (4.0 m × 7.0 m) is also northwest of the cabin. It has a concrete foundation and walls of concrete and flat sawn logs. The roof is gable with green metal roofing. The east wall with a wooden overhead garage door faces the lake and there is a concrete boat ramp. The interior has wooden walls and a concrete floor.

== History ==
The Shoshone people were the predominant native people in this area. The first non-native people to arrive were fur trappers and traders who came in the 1820s. Two historic trails pass near here along the South Fork of the Madison River, the Bannock Trail which follows the trail system of the native people, and the Nez Perce National Historic Trail, which Chief Joseph led his Nez Perce tribe along during the 1877 Nez Perce War.

The cabin was built pursuant to the Term Occupancy Act of 1915, which allowed private recreational residences to be built on United States Forest Service land from 1915–-1932. It was originally built by a group of fishermen from Salt Lake City who came to the region every year to fish the South Fork of the Madison River. They originally traveled by train and then by covered wagon over the Continental Divide. John Horlick was a member of this fishing group and the original owner of the cabin, which was then located within the Madison National Forest. The Madison National Forest became part of the Hebgen Lake Ranger District of the Gallatin National Forest in 1931. The cabin is the earliest permitted cabin within this tract.

Running water was added about 1939. Additions over the years to all three structures have retained their original character and appearance. A significant change to the site was caused by the 1959 Hebgen Lake earthquake when Hebgen Lake receded by 22 feet (6.7 m), raising the south shore and lowering the north shore, leaving a wide gravel beach along the lakefront of the cabins on the southern side of the lake.

Beginning in 2006, the Forest Service's Northern Region began encouraging qualifying buildings to be nominated for listing as National Registered Historic Place.

== Use ==
The Gallatin National Forest operates campsites nearby on the public recreational Lonesomehurst tract with 27 campsites, 5 of them with electricity, on a first-come, first-served basis. Boat ramps are nearby.

== See also ==
- National Register of Historic Places listings in Gallatin County, Montana
