= West Yellowstone Oregon Shortline Terminus Historic District =

Historic district in Montana, United States

- U.S. National Register of Historic Places
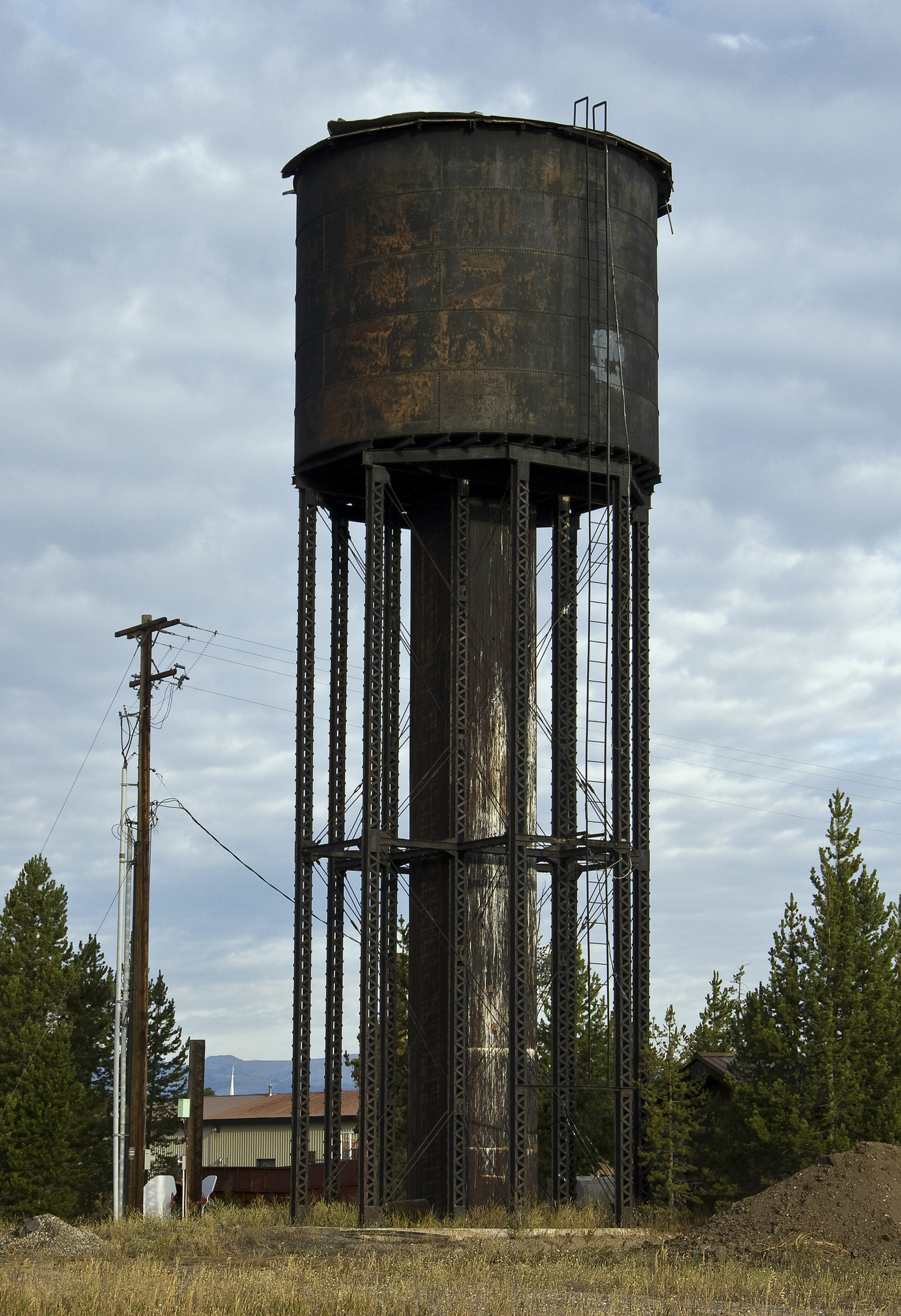
- Water tower in West Yellowstone at the terminus of the West Yellowstone Oregon Shortline

- Location within Montana Location within the United States
- Location: Yellowstone Ave, West Yellowstone, Montana
- Coordinates: 44.658333°N 111.101667°W
- Area: 10 acres (4.0 ha)
- Built: 1905–1927
- NRHP reference No.: 83001069
- Added to NRHP: April 13, 1983

The West Yellowstone Oregon Shortline Terminus Historic District is a historic district in West Yellowstone, Montana that is ten acres in size and includes 16 structures and buildings. The historic district was built around the terminus of a spur of the Oregon Short Line Railroad, which ran from Idaho Falls, Idaho to West Yellowstone. The completion of the terminus in 1907 in the remote forested area near the west entrance of Yellowstone National Park initiated the planning and development of the town of West Yellowstone, and many of the structures associated with the historical district were built in this time period. The town prospered with the influx of tourism brought by the new railroad line. Seeing the revenue generated from serving tourists passing through West Yellowstone on their way to the nearby national park, the Union Pacific Railroad Company expanded its facilities to include restaurants and lodgings. These buildings, built between 1910 and 1926, are also included in the historic site description. Union Pacific's depot, baggage building, dining lodge, dormitories, and boiler building were designed by noted American architect Gilbert Stanley Underwood. The site was added to the National Register of Historic Places on April 13, 1983.

== National Register of Historic Places ==
The buildings and structures in the historical site are associated with two periods of significance: the construction of the railroad terminus between 1908 and 1910 and Union Pacific Railroad Company's subsequent construction of accommodations for tourists. Underwood had designed several Union Pacific depots and stations before designing the depot at West Yellowstone. Underwood "combines rustic stylistic features with basic irregular Richardsonian Romanesque massing" in this depot, departing from his previous Beaux Art style. Underwood's later designs for the dining hall and dormitories in West Yellowstone further explored "the possibilities of the naturalistic rustic style in this heavily wooded, remote setting."

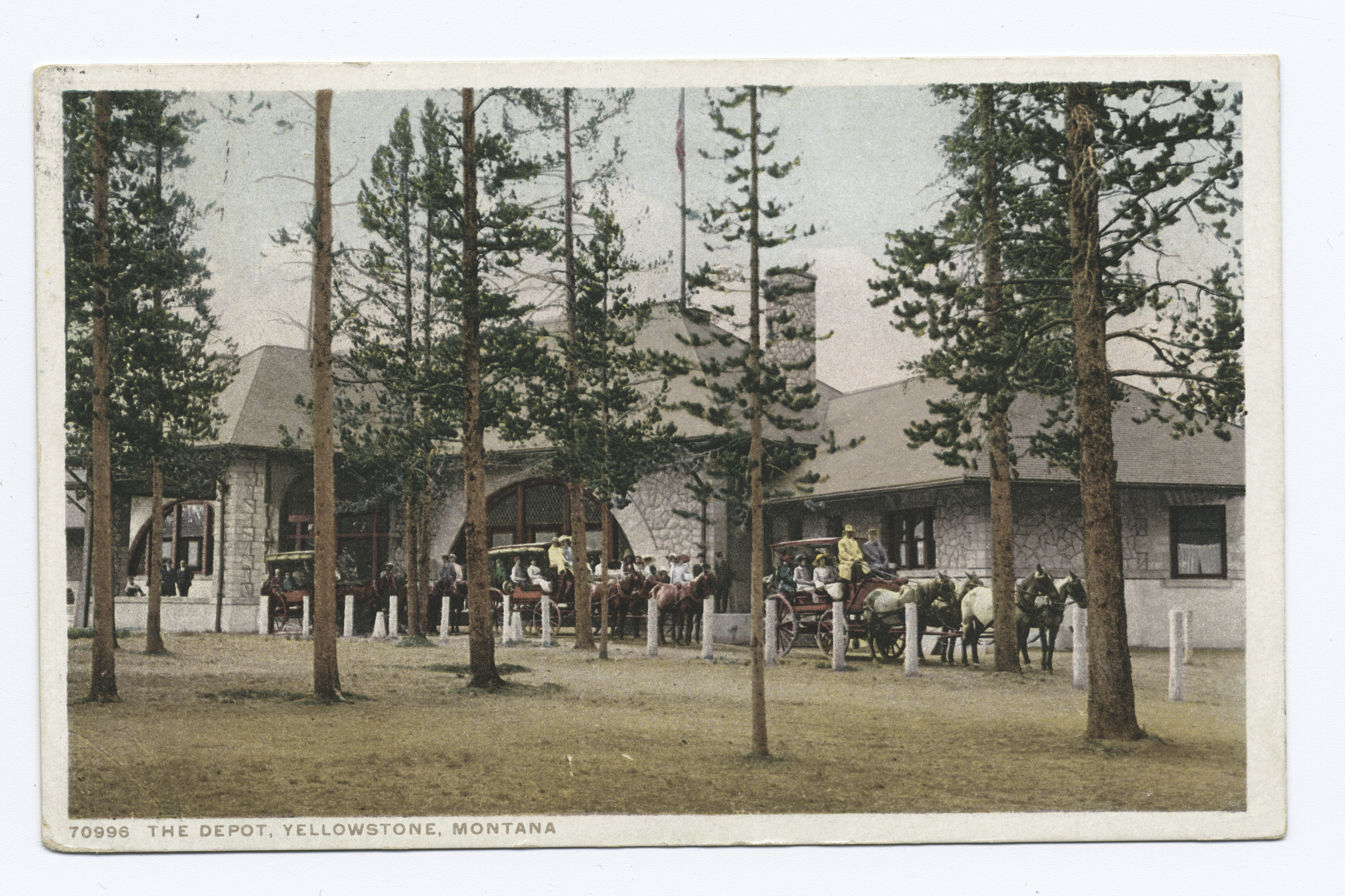
West Yellowstone Depot, early 20th century postcard

The West Yellowstone Oregon Shortline Terminus Historic District was inscribed on to the National Register of Historic Places based on Criterion A ("the property must make a contribution to the major pattern of American history") and Criterion B ("concerns the distinctive characteristics of the building by its architecture and construction, including having great artistic value or being the work of a master").

== Buildings ==
=== The Depot Building ===
The Depot is a single-story, hip-roofed building, constructed of dimensional wood framing, brick, concrete, and quarry-faced native rhyolite stone. Completed in 1909, the depot welcomed tourists traveling to Yellowstone National Park for guided tours, first by stagecoach and then by automobile. The train stopped along the railroad terminus on the south side of the building, and passengers entered the women's or men's waiting rooms on the side wings of the depot. The central part of the building included the waiting areas, the ticketing counters, and the porte-cochere. Due to the train schedule, passengers often visited the nearby Dining Lodge to eat a meal before departing on their Yellowstone tour from the north side of the depot.

In 2000, the Yellowstone Historic Center leased the depot from the Town of West Yellowstone. The YHC spearheaded many major repair and restoration projects, including replacing the shingle roof, restoring interior features such as the ticket counter, repairing the ceilings, and upgrading electrical services and lines. The depot now is the home of the Museum of the Yellowstone.

=== Union Pacific Dining Lodge ===
Designed in the Rustic architecture style, the Dining Lodge opened for the 1926 tourist season with a lounge, the "Firehole Room," and the main dining area, "the Mammoth Room." At one end of the Mammoth Room, a massive, arrowhead-shaped fireplace provided heat and added to the aesthetic. The building also included a large kitchen, a service wing, bakery, butcher shop, scullery, linen room, coal room, manager's office, and walk-in refrigerators and freezers.

The Town of West Yellowstone invested in a major renovation to the building in 2008, after receiving a $400,000 grant through the Save America's Treasures program. The town raised matching funds through a bond passed by the townspeople. The Yellowstone Historic Center now manages the building and oversees its use as an event venue.

== See also ==
- National Register of Historic Places in Gallatin Country, Montana
