= Willow Creek, Montana =

Census-designated place in Gallatin County, Montana, United States

- Census-designated place
- Location of Willow Creek, Montana
- Coordinates: 45°49′38″N 111°38′04″W
- Country: United States
- State: Montana
- County: Gallatin

Area
  - Total: 2.73 sq mi (7.07 km^{2})
  - Land: 2.73 sq mi (7.07 km^{2})
  - Water: 0 sq mi (0.00 km^{2})
- Elevation: 4,173 ft (1,272 m)

Population (2020)
  - Total: 230
  - Density: 84.3/sq mi (32.54/km^{2})
- Time zone: UTC-7 (Mountain (MST))
  - Summer (DST): UTC-6 (MDT)
- ZIP code: 59760
- Area code: 406
- FIPS code: 30-80800
- GNIS feature ID: 2409599

Willow Creek is a census-designated place (CDP) in Gallatin County, Montana, United States. As of the 2020 census, Willow Creek had a population of 230. It is part of the Bozeman, MT Micropolitan Statistical Area.

== History ==
The settlement here began in 1864 and soon grew due to a mining boom in nearby Norwegian Gulch. The Northern Pacific Railroad arrived at Willow Creek in 1883.

== Geography ==
Willow Creek is located in western Gallatin County where the valley of Willow Creek (the stream) enters the valley of the Jefferson River. It is 6 miles (10 km) southwest of Three Forks and 7 miles (11 km) southwest of Interstate 90.

According to the United States Census Bureau, the CDP has a total area of 2.73 square miles (7.08 km^{2}), all land.

== Demographics ==
Historical population
Census	Pop.	Note	%±
2020	230		—
U.S. Decennial Census

As of the census of 2000, there were 209 people, 81 households, and 52 families residing in the CDP. The population density was 192.4 inhabitants per square mile (74.3/km^{2}). There were 84 housing units at an average density of 77.3 per square mile (29.8/km^{2}). The racial makeup of the CDP was 92.34% White, 0.96% Asian, 0.48% Pacific Islander, 3.83% from other races, and 2.39% from two or more races. Hispanic or Latino of any race were 5.26% of the population.

There were 81 households, out of which 34.6% had children under the age of 18 living with them, 54.3% were married couples living together, 4.9% had a female householder with no husband present, and 34.6% were non-families. 30.9% of all households were made up of individuals, and 9.9% had someone living alone who was 65 years of age or older. The average household size was 2.58 and the average family size was 3.23.

In the CDP, the population was spread out, with 31.6% under the age of 18, 8.1% from 18 to 24, 30.6% from 25 to 44, 20.1% from 45 to 64, and 9.6% who were 65 years of age or older. The median age was 34 years. For every 100 females, there were 93.5 males. For every 100 females age 18 and over, there were 101.4 males.

The median income for a household in the CDP was $32,386, and the median income for a family was $32,083. Males had a median income of $25,000 versus $17,500 for females. The per capita income for the CDP was $13,251. About 15.5% of families and 14.0% of the population were below the poverty line, including 20.3% of those under the age of eighteen and 13.3% of those 65 or over.

== Education ==
Most of the CDP is in Willow Creek Elementary School District and the Willow Creek High School District. A portion of the CDP is in the Three Forks Elementary School District and the Three Forks High School District. The Willow Creek elementary and high school districts are both a part of Willow Creek Public Schools. The Three Forks elementary and high school districts are both a part of Three Forks Public Schools.

Willow Creek School educates students from kindergarten through 12th grade. They are known as the Broncs. Willow Creek High School is a Class C school (less than 108 students) which helps determine athletic competitions.

== See also ==
- List of census-designated places in Montana
