= Bozeman Carnegie Library =

- U.S. National Register of Historic Places
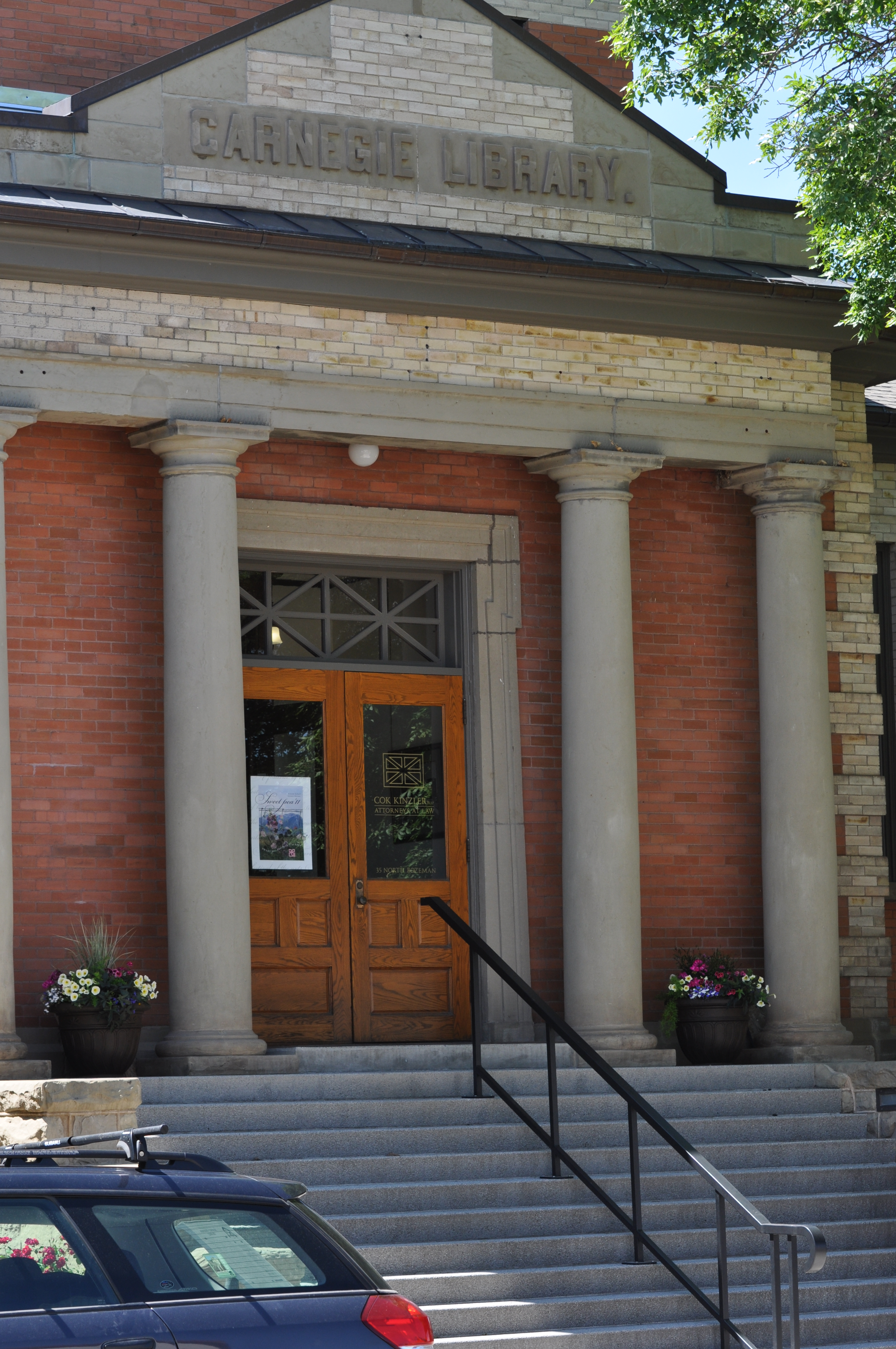
- Bozeman Carnegie Library in 2011

- Location within Montana Location within the United States
- Location: 35 N. Bozeman Ave., Bozeman, Montana
- Coordinates: 45°40′49″N 111°2′4″W
- Area: 0.6 acres (0.24 ha)
- Built: 1903–1904
- Architect: Charles S. Haire
- Architectural style: Classical Revival
- NRHP reference No.: 79001402
- Added to NRHP: February 2, 1979

The Bozeman Carnegie Library in Bozeman, Montana was built in 1903–1904 with funding from Andrew Carnegie. City librarian Bell Chrisman led the effort to convince the city to seek Carnegie funds. It is one of 17 libraries in Montana and 1,679 in the United States funded by Carnegie. It was built on a Greek Cross plan in Classical Revival style, with Roman Doric columns supporting a triangular pediment at its entrance. The library was listed on the National Register of Historic Places on February 2, 1979. Today, the building houses the law offices of Cok Kinzler, PLLP.

== Establishment ==
By 1900, the small libraries that had served Bozeman since 1872 were inadequate. Local librarian Bell Chrisman wrote directly to Andrew Carnegie, explaining the need for a new library. Carnegie donated $15,000, and the city of Bozeman pledged annual support and provided land, which at the time happened to be across the street from the red-light district and Chinatown, which had opium dens. Reform-minded citizens with Progressive beliefs, led by Bell Chrisman, intentionally selected the location to rid Bozeman of its disreputable neighborhood. Although the proposed location met considerable opposition, Chrisman and her followers prevailed, and the red-light district and the Chinese population dwindled.

The building was designed by Charles S. Haire, an architect from Helena, Montana, and served as a library until 1980 when a new library was completed. The building then housed city offices. By the mid-1990s, the building was in a serious state of disrepair. In 1998, Michael Wheat, now a member of the Montana Supreme Court, and his law partner, Michael Cok, purchased the building for their law offices and undertook extensive renovations which were completed in 1999. Today, the building is often opened for public events, including Historic Preservation Week.

According to local preservationist B. Derek Strahn, several other buildings in Bozeman's historic section were renovated in the 1990s and early 2000s, but "few have had as great an impact as the restoration and rehabilitation of Bozeman's cherished Carnegie Library."

== See also ==
- National Register of Historic Places listings in Gallatin County, Montana
