= Bohart House =

Historic house in Montana, United States

- U.S. National Register of Historic Places
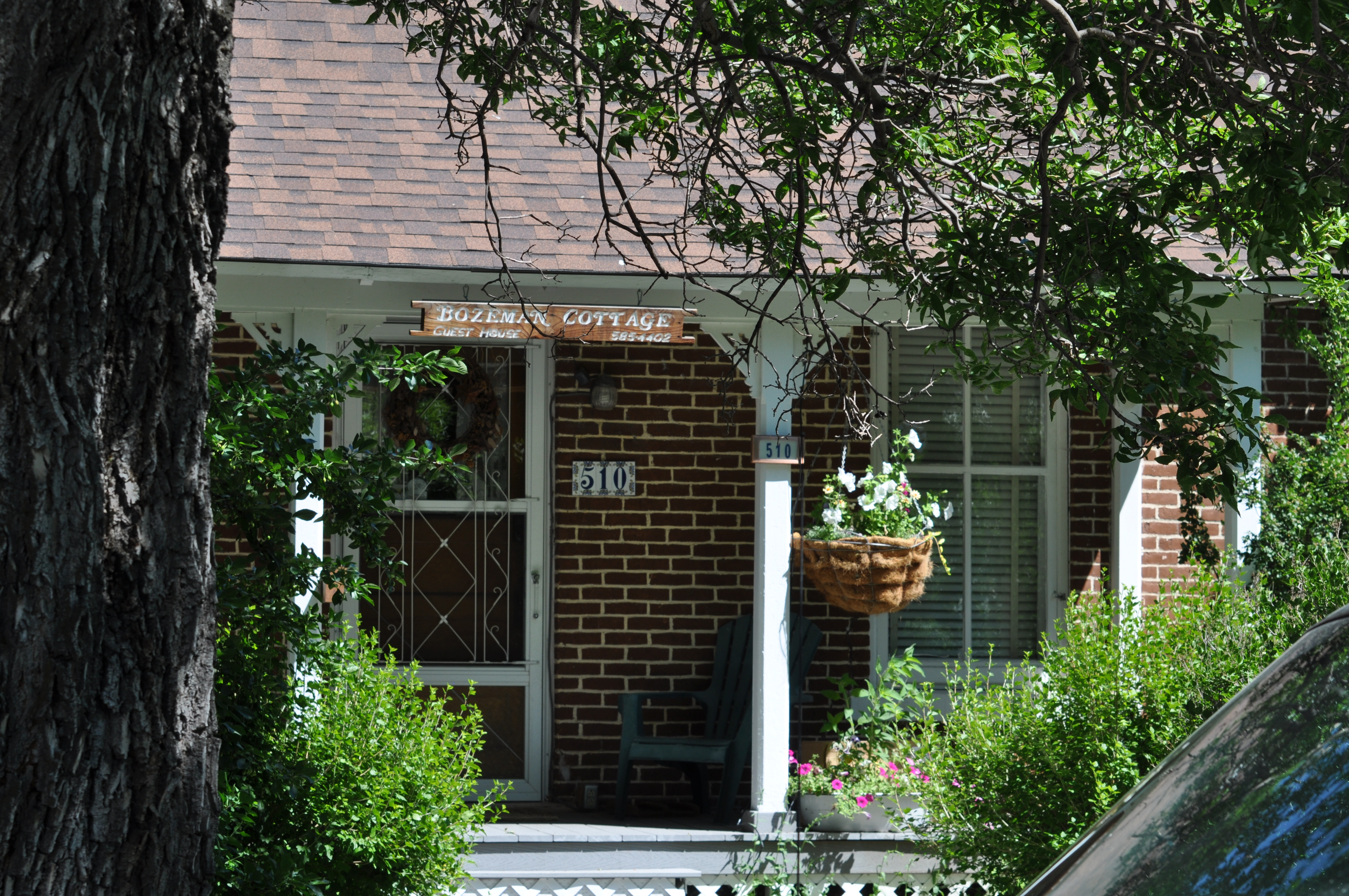

- Location within Montana Location within the United States
- Location: 510 N. Church, Bozeman, Montana
- Coordinates: 45°41′07″N 111°01′42″W
- Area: less than one acre
- Built: 1889
- MPS: Bozeman MRA
- NRHP reference No.: 87001810
- Added to NRHP: October 23, 1987

The Bohart House, at 510 N. Church in Bozeman, Montana, was listed on the National Register of Historic Places in 1987.

It is a brick house, probably built by Freeman Bohart in 1889.

It was deemed significant as "one of the last houses in Bozeman built during the building boom which was triggered in the early 1880s by the arrival of the Northern Pacific Railroad. This house represents the northern limit of the city's residential expansion during that active period." Only cultivated fields lay beyond the site, according to an 1890 Sanborn map. It is a one-story house with a gable roof and a hipped roof porch.
