= Beall Park Community Center =

- U.S. National Register of Historic Places
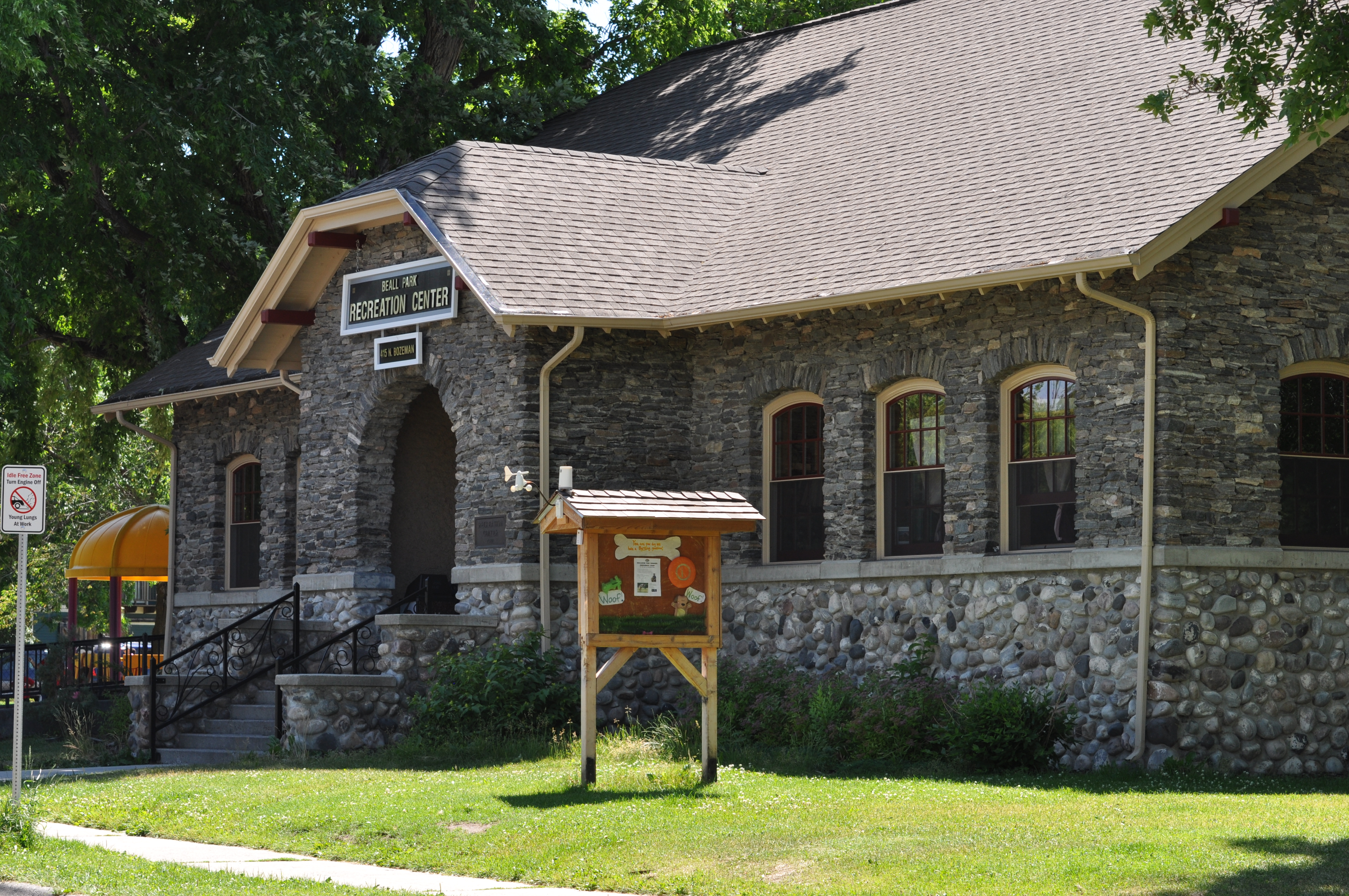

- Location within Montana Location within the United States
- Location: 409 N. Bozeman, Bozeman, Montana
- Coordinates: 45°41′02″N 111°02′03″W
- Area: less than one acre
- Built: 1927
- Architect: W.R. Plew
- Architectural style: Bungalow/Craftsman
- MPS: Bozeman MRA
- NRHP reference No.: 87001807
- Added to NRHP: October 23, 1987

The Beall Park Community Center, at 409 N. Bozeman in Bozeman, Montana, was built in 1927. It was listed on the National Register of Historic Places in 1987.

It was a work of architect W.R. Plew and was deemed an excellent example of Craftsman architecture.
