= Spieth and Krug Brewery =

- U.S. National Register of Historic Places
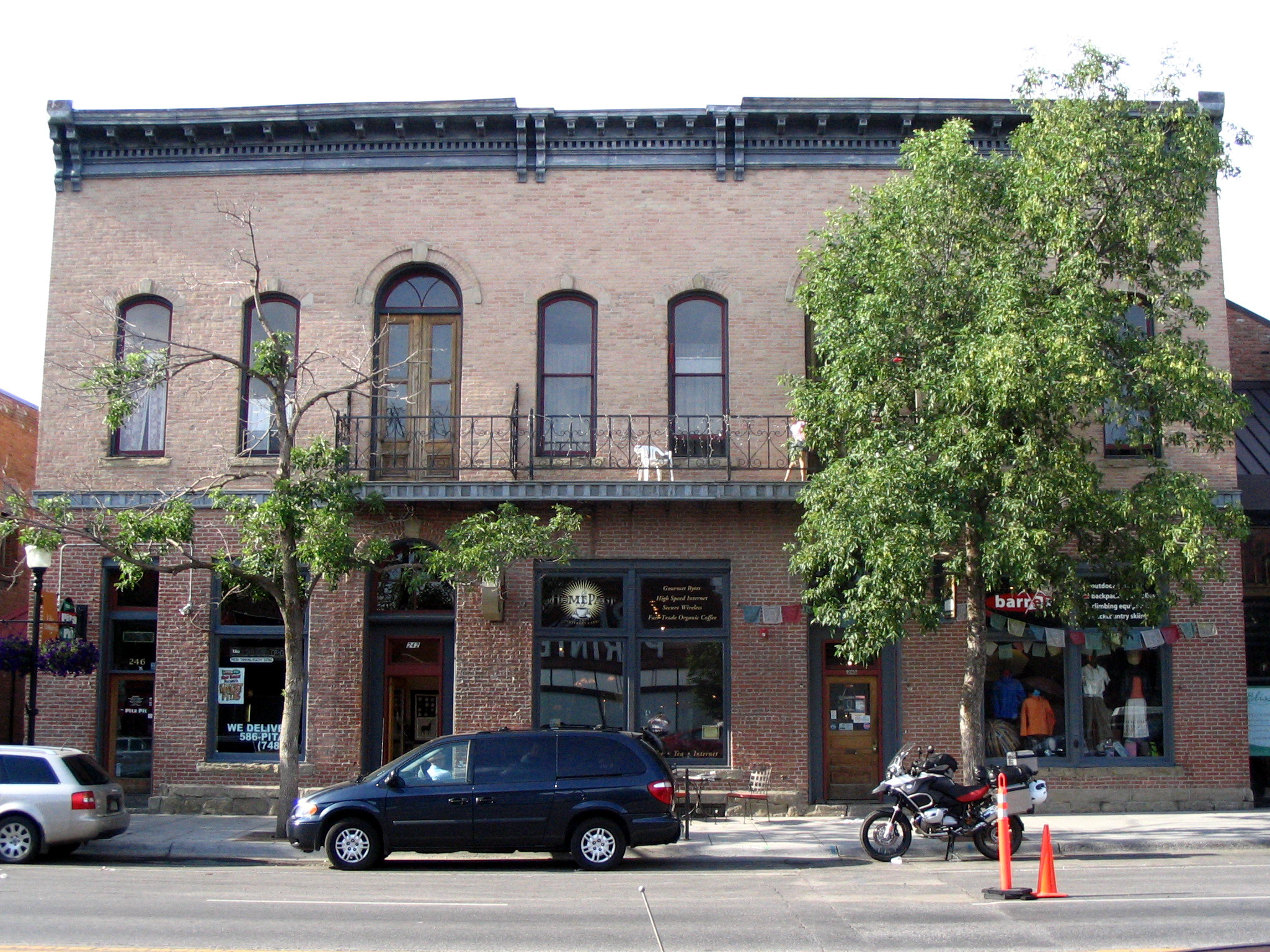
- Spieth and Krug Brewery in 2007

- Location within Montana Location within the United States
- Location: 238–246 E. Main St., Bozeman, Montana
- Coordinates: 45°40′54″N 111°1′53″W
- Area: less than one acre
- Built: 1882
- NRHP reference No.: 84002473
- Added to NRHP: April 19, 1984

The Spieth and Krug Brewery, also known as "Union Hall" and "Maxey Block", is a brewery established in 1867 in Bozeman, Montana by two German immigrants, Jacob Spieth and Charles Krug. The current building was built in 1882. In 1895, the brewery was bought by Julius Lehrkind, whose descendants still operate beverage businesses in Bozeman.

== Description ==
The current building was constructed from 1882 to 1883 with brick in a Victorian Italianate architecture style for Jacob Spieth and Charles Krug, brewers who had immigrated to America from Germany. The 1867 structure burned down and was rebuilt in 1882. It had a similar architectural style at its corners but was framed instead of brick. The building is built over Bozeman Creek, which runs through downtown Bozeman. The waterway, particularly its rural portion, is also known as Sourdough Creek. The creek water was used for brewing and refrigeration. The upper floor has served as a dance hall. Daniel Maxey was the brewery manager in the early 1890s. In 1945, the Bozeman Trades and Labor Council remodelled the second floor, which became known as Union Hall. In 1983, the ground floor of the brewery building became the site of "John Bozeman's Bistro" for many years until the restaurant moved to a different building on West Main Street.

== History ==
Jacob Friedrich Spieth was born on April 10, 1833, in Hegensberg near Esslingen, Württemberg, and died in Montana. He arrived in America on October 6, 1854, aboard the Eliza Challory. He spent some time on farms in Ohio and Illinois and moved to Alder Gulch, Montana, in 1863, where he began mining gold. Spieth also farmed and raised livestock. After relocating to various gold mining camps in Montana, he had the opportunity to meet Charles Krug. The brewery business grew steadily for at least 20 years. Barbara A. Shock/Schok (1844–1931) married Spieth on July 10, 1871, in Hudson City, New York. They had four sons and one daughter. Spieth committed suicide using strychnine on April 10, 1892. Hellinger & Hansen bought the business and then sold it to Julius Lehrkind. Charles Krug was born in Germany in 1844 and came to America in 1856, initially settling in Missouri. He moved to Virginia City, Montana in 1864 and began mining gold.

Charles Krug died on May 7, 1888. Upon Krug's death, Spieth inherited Krug's share of the brewery and saloon business. Spieth died almost exactly four years later, in 1892. Both of them died intestate, leaving no will, and both men's estates were considered insolvent. In 1888, Anne Ryan had obtained a $9,000 judgment against the partnership. When the judgment had not been paid by the time Spieth died, they filed suit against the administrator of Krug's estate and Barbara Spieth, the administrator of Spieth's estate, claiming that the Spieths had conspired to give Barbara all of the business' assets in order to defraud its creditors—but also claiming this alleged conspiracy began two years before Krug's death. The estate administrators objected to the lawsuit, seeking dismissal. The suit was dismissed by the local court, essentially because it was so poorly drafted, but also because Ryan had not exhausted her legal remedies. On appeal in 1896, the Montana Supreme Court agreed that the complaint was "uncertain, ambiguous, and unintelligible". Also, it noted that the attorney who had drafted it had since been disbarred for "dishonourable and unprofessional conduct". The court found that executing judgment on the Krug and Spieth estates would be useless, as Ryan knew there were no assets. Noting the legal maxim that the law does not require a meaningless act, and finding that there were issues of equity involved, the state Supreme Court found that Ryan did have adequate grounds for the suit to be filed, no matter how poorly the initial documents had been drafted. Sympathetic to Ryan and her new attorney, the Court issued an unusual decision: the justices upheld most of the reasons for the trial court's dismissal but also created a remedy for Ryan's alleged wrong: they remanded the case back to the lower court and did not fully affirm the dismissal; the law contained a possibility to allow the complaint to be amended to remove the objectionable sections, and so the District Court was instructed to give Ryan's new attorney 30 days to amend the complaint and re-file it so that the case could go forward, but if the new attorney did not appropriately amend the complaint, then the dismissal would be affirmed.

== Lehrkind purchase ==
While the brewery was having legal woes, Julius Lehrkind, a German immigrant who spent the previous 26 years running a brewery in Davenport, Iowa, moved to Bozeman in 1895, bought the Spieth and Krug Brewery, moved it to the north end of town, and renamed it the Bozeman Brewery. He brought his extended family and a crew of experienced brewers with him. Bozeman Brewery opened in 1895 and was the largest building in Bozeman until 1957 when the Brick Breeden Fieldhouse opened at Montana State University. Lehrkind also ran the Red Lodge Brewery in Red Lodge, Montana. Soon after opening his own brewery in 1895, Lehrkind also entered the soft drink business, making sarsaparilla and lemon soda. In 1914, he was awarded the local Coca-Cola franchise. The brewery went out of business when prohibition came in 1919, but the Coca-Cola business is still in operation as Lehrkind's Coca-Cola Bottling. The Lehrkind Mansion, built in 1897, is now a bed and breakfast and part of the Bozeman Brewery Historic District.

== See also ==
- National Register of Historic Places listings in Gallatin County, Montana
