= Three Forks Airport =

Three Forks Airport Pogreba Field
- IATA: none; ICAO: none; FAA LID: 9S5

Summary
- Airport type: Public
- Owner: Gallatin County
- Serves: Three Forks, Montana
- Elevation AMSL: 4,089 ft / 1,246 m
- Coordinates: 45°52′41″N 111°34′10″W

Map
- Location of airport in Montana

Runways
Direction	Length		Surface
Direction	ft	m	Surface
2/20	5,100	1,554	Asphalt

Statistics (2011)
- Aircraft operations: 11,530
- Based aircraft: 31
- Source: Federal Aviation Administration

Three Forks Airport (FAA LID: 9S5) is a public use airport in Gallatin County, Montana, United States. The airport is owned by Gallatin County and located one nautical mile (2 km) southeast of the central business district of Three Forks, Montana. It is also known as Pogreba Field, named for Dean A. Pogreba, a World War II, Korean War and Vietnam War combat aviator from Three Forks. This airport is included in the National Plan of Integrated Airport Systems for 2011–2015, which categorized it as a general aviation facility.

== Facilities and aircraft ==
Three Forks Airport covers an area of 160 acres (65 ha) at an elevation of 4,089 feet (1,246 m) above mean sea level. It has one runway designated 2/20 with an asphalt surface measuring 5,100 by 60 feet (1,554 x 18 m).

For the 12-month period ending August 17, 2011, the airport had 11,530 aircraft operations, an average of 31 per day: 63% air taxi, 28% general aviation, and 9% military. At that time there were 31 aircraft based at this airport: 81% single-engine, 16% ultralight, and 3% helicopter.

== See also ==
- List of airports in Montana
- Airway Radio Station
