= Flaming Arrow Lodge =

- U.S. National Register of Historic Places
- Location within Montana Location within the United States
- Location: 15521 Bridger Canyon Rd., Bozeman, Montana
- Coordinates: 45°48′34″N 110°53′03″W
- Area: 4 acres (1.6 ha)
- Built: 1934–35
- Built by: Wallace R. Diteman
- Architect: Arthur L. McKinney
- Architectural style: Rustic
- NRHP reference No.: 94000784
- Added to NRHP: July 29, 1994

The Flaming Arrow Lodge, at 15521 Bridger Canyon Rd. in Bozeman, Montana, was built in 1934. It was listed on the National Register of Historic Places in 1994.

The builder was Wallace R. Diteman, and the architect was Arthur L. McKinney. It is a Rustic lodge.

It was the "centerpiece" of the Flaming Arrow Ranch. In its National Register nomination, it was deemed significant in part

because of its stylistic design features, method of construction, and association with a distinct and specific architectural expression as it evolved in the West during the period of 1910- 1940. It is an excellent example of the Western Rustic style, a romanticized and embellished, later version of the building technology used by the pioneering forefathers as they settled in the West. During the opening years of the twentieth century, log construction was refined and exaggerated as it was applied to dude ranches, summer camps and recreational facilities, designed to lure tourists to the state. The Lodge, once centerpiece of the Flaming Arrow Ranch, serves as a visual reminder of the dream of the Arthur L. McKinney family to create a boys' "vocational/educational" camp, a summer theatre, and schools of art and drama in the inspirational Bridger Mountains. Though the dream was not to become a reality, the Flaming Arrow Ranch ultimately established Bridger Canyon as a major outdoor recreation area (Criterion A) and introduced recreationists, "dudes," and Boy Scouts to rustic camp living for many years. The Flaming Arrow Lodge and the McKinneys residence (now under separate ownership) are all that remain of the ranch.
