= Trident School =

- U.S. National Register of Historic Places
- Location within Montana Location within the United States
- Location: S of Trident, Trident, Montana
- Coordinates: 45°56′58″N 111°28′24″W
- Area: less than one acre
- Built: 1911
- MPS: One Room Schoolhouses of Gallatin County TR
- NRHP reference No.: 81000364
- Added to NRHP: July 21, 1981

The Trident School, located south of Trident, Montana, was built in 1911. It was listed on the National Register of Historic Places in 1981.

It is a one-story woodframe building which was started as a one-room schoolhouse in 1911 and expanded in 1914. It was built to serve the company town of the Trident Cement Company, and, relatedly, has a stucco exterior.
