= Charles Lundwall Building =

- U.S. National Register of Historic Places
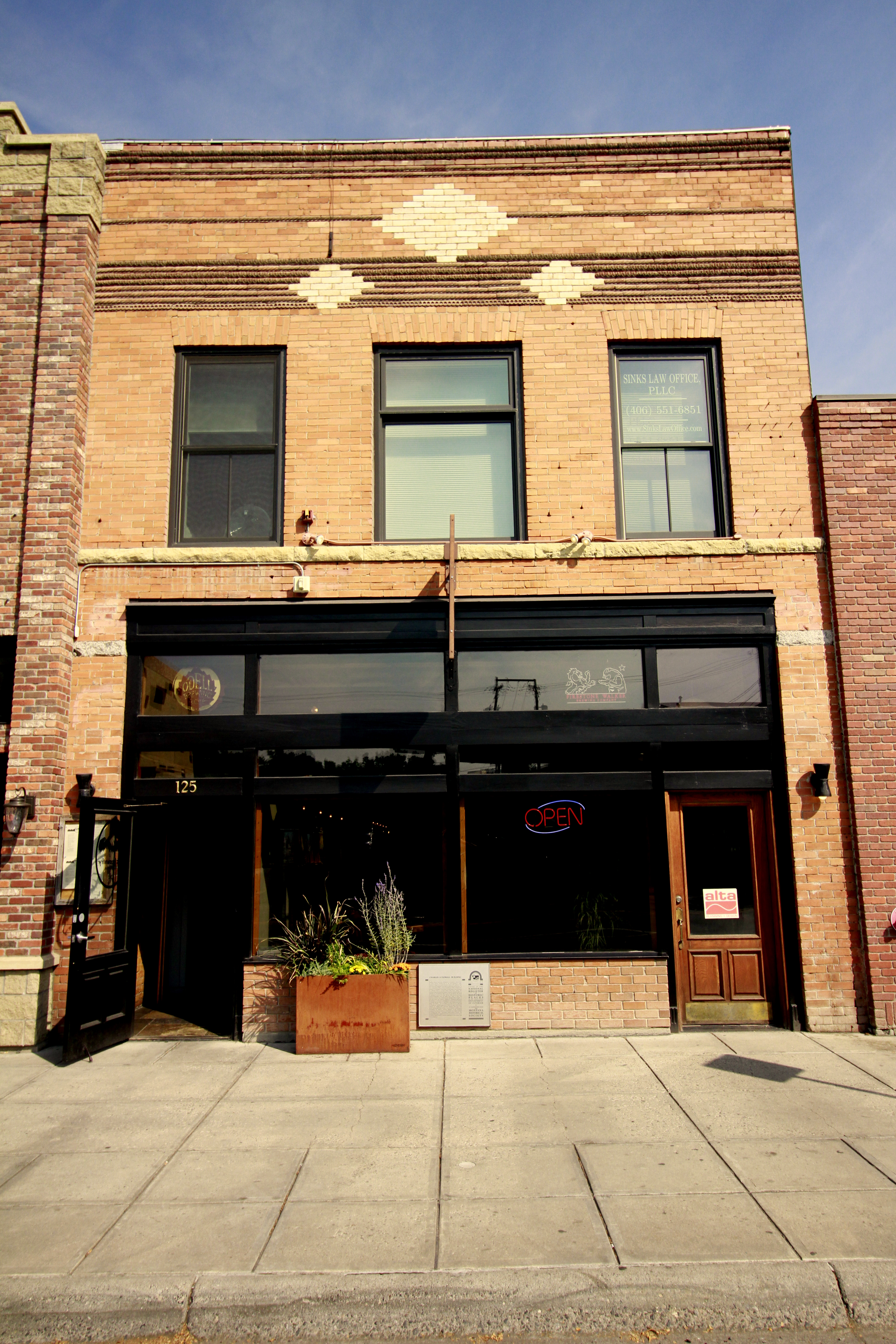

- Location within Montana
- Location: 123-125 W. Main St., Bozeman, Montana
- Coordinates: 45°40′53″N 111°02′22″W
- Area: less than one acre
- Built: 1905
- Architectural style: Early Commercial
- NRHP reference No.: 00001611
- Added to NRHP: January 4, 2001

The Charles Lundwall Building, at 123-125 W. Main St. in Bozeman, Montana, was built in 1905 in Early Commercial style. It was listed on the National Register of Historic Places in 2001.

It is a two-story building with a flat roof.

It is located two doors east from the six-story Baxter Hotel, the easternmost building in the Main Street Historic District.
