= Reese Creek School =

- U.S. National Register of Historic Places
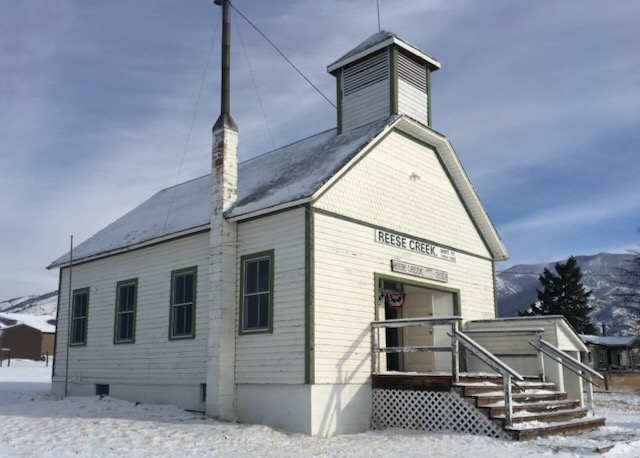
- Reese Creek School House in 2020

- Location within Montana
- Nearest city: Belgrade, Montana
- Coordinates: 45.875767°N 111.080034°W
- Area: less than one acre
- Built: 1906
- MPS: One Room Schoolhouses of Gallatin County TR
- NRHP reference No.: 81000342
- Added to NRHP: July 21, 1981

The Reese Creek School in Gallatin County, Montana, northeast of Belgrade, Montana, is a one-room schoolhouse which was built in 1906. It was listed on the National Register of Historic Places in 1981.

It is a balloon-framed one-room schoolhouse building with a recessed entrance and a large cupola.

It is located on Springhill Road.
