= Brandenburg House =

Historic house in Montana, United States

- U.S. National Register of Historic Places
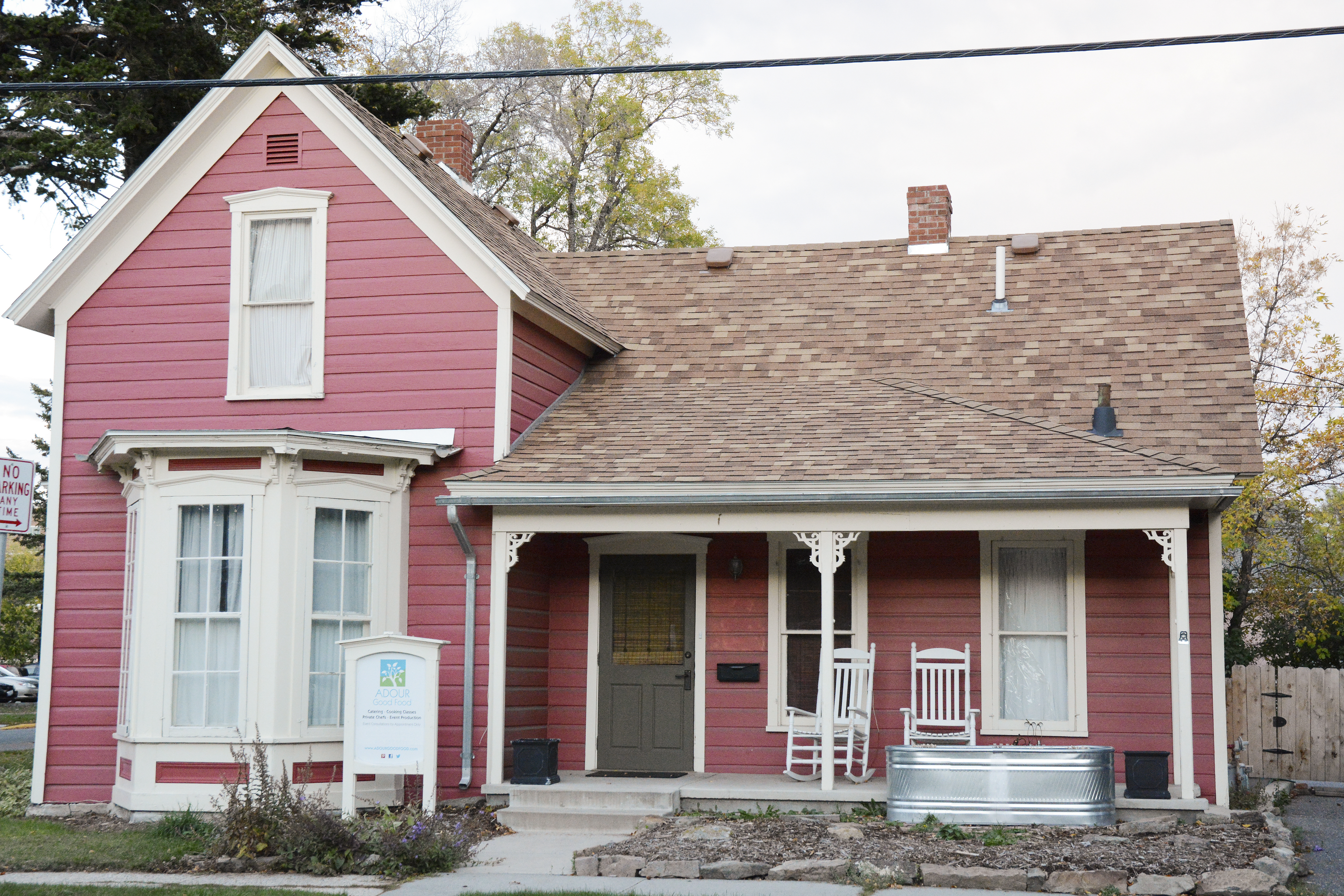

- Location within Montana Location within the United States
- Location: 122 W. Lamme, Bozeman, Montana
- Coordinates: 45°40′51″N 111°02′20″W
- Area: less than one acre
- Built: c.1883
- Built by: W.T. Brandenburg
- MPS: Bozeman MRA
- NRHP reference No.: 87001804
- Added to NRHP: October 23, 1987

Brandenburg House, at 122 W. Lamme in Bozeman, Montana, was built around 1883, which was the year the Northern Pacific Railroad arrived. It was listed on the National Register of Historic Places in 1987.

It is a two-story one-family I-house with a one-story cross section at the rear making the house's plan T-shaped. It was built by William T. Brandenburg, a carpenter; he and his wife Mary J. Brandenburg lived there until about 1940.

It was deemed to be "one of the most architecturally significant houses in Bozeman" and "the best preserved example of the few remaining examples of the I-House building type, once common in the city. It is also one of the few houses that displays Italianate style detailing."
