= Three Forks, Montana =

City in Montana, United States

- City
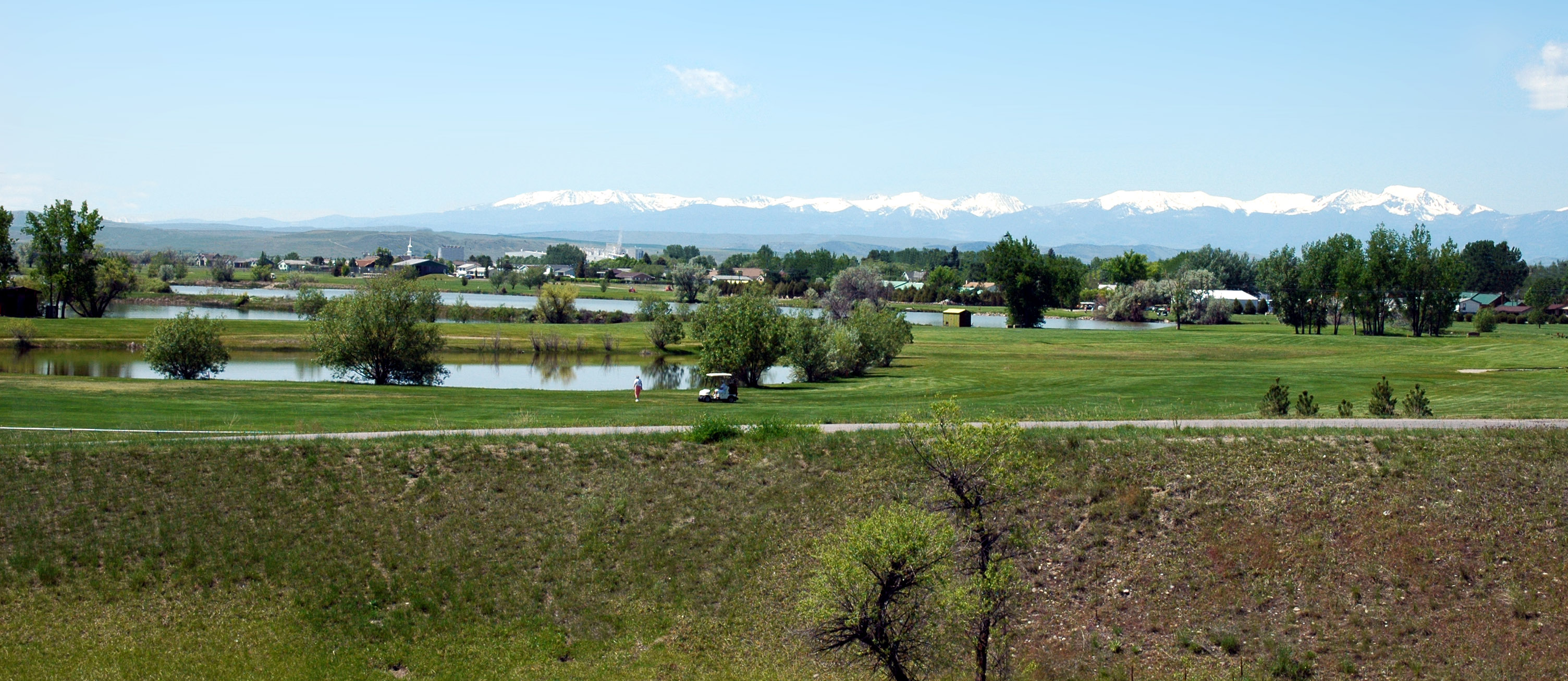
- Three Forks and the Tobacco Root Mountains

- Seal

- Location of Three Forks, Montana
- Coordinates: 45°52′50″N 111°33′46″W
- Country: United States
- State: Montana
- County: Gallatin

Government
  - Type: Montana Incorporated City, Elected Mayor and City Council

Area
  - Total: 1.50 sq mi (3.88 km^{2})
  - Land: 1.44 sq mi (3.73 km^{2})
  - Water: 0.058 sq mi (0.15 km^{2})
- Elevation: 4,072 ft (1,241 m)

Population (2020)
  - Total: 1,989
  - Density: 1,382.4/sq mi (533.74/km^{2})
- Time zone: UTC-7 (Mountain (MST))
  - Summer (DST): UTC-6 (MDT)
- ZIP code: 59752
- Area code: 406
- FIPS code: 30-73975
- GNIS feature ID: 2412067
- Website: threeforksmontana.us

Three Forks is a city in Gallatin County, Montana, United States and is located within the watershed valley system of both the Missouri and Mississippi rivers drainage basins — and is historically considered the birthplace or start of the Missouri River. The population was 1,989 at the 2020 census. The city of Three Forks is named so because it lies geographically near the point, in nearby Missouri Headwaters State Park, where the Jefferson, Madison, and Gallatin rivers converge to form the Missouri River — the longest single river in North America, as well as the major portion of the Missouri–Mississippi River System from the headwaters near Three Forks to its discharge into the Gulf of Mexico. Three Forks is part of the Bozeman, MT Micropolitan Statistical Area of approximately 100,000 people and located thirty miles west of Bozeman.

== History ==
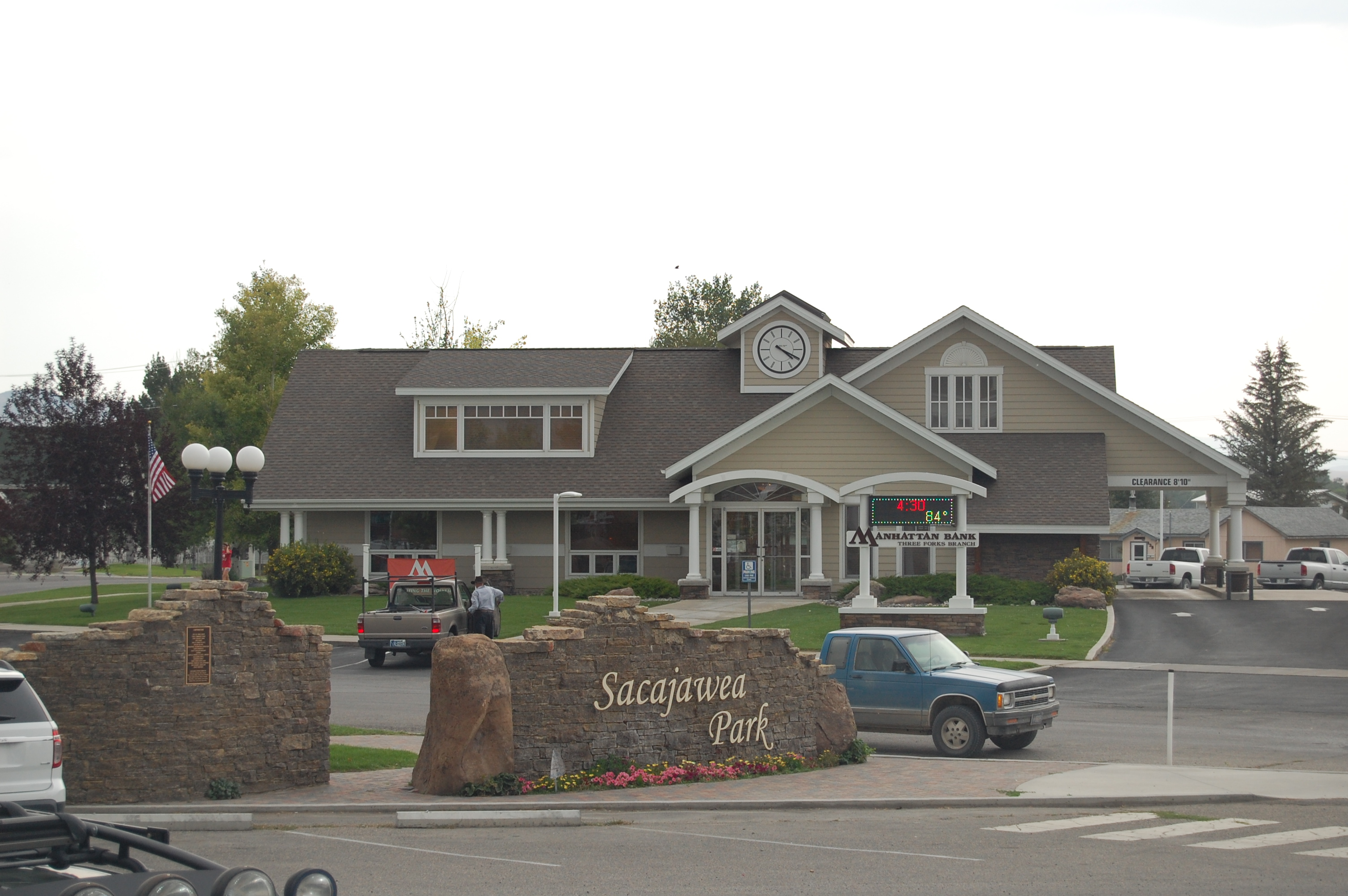
Sacajawea Park, a memorial to Sacajawea, in Three Forks

The three rivers, west to east, were named by Meriwether Lewis in late July 1805 for President Thomas Jefferson, Secretary of State James Madison, and Treasury Secretary Albert Gallatin which prompted controversy at the time. Eventually this spawned a modern-day geographical controversy—in both cases regarding length comparisons between the Missouri and Mississippi rivers. Today the two confluences are incorporated inside Missouri Headwaters State Park, which is also a U.S. National Historic Landmark.

The Lewis and Clark expedition visited the site on July 28, 1805. Meriwether Lewis in his journal entry wrote:

"Both Capt. C. and myself corrisponded in opinion with rispect to the impropriety of calling either of these [three] streams the Missouri and accordingly agreed to name them after the President of the United States and the Secretaries of the Treasury and state..."

One consequence of their decision to designate, map and name the Jefferson—the largest— as a separate tributary river, is that today the Mississippi River can arguably be called longer than the Missouri River because extensive re-channelization of the streambed for hydroelectric power projects has shortened the river while the Mississippi Delta has grown, lengthening the rival river.

Honored in Three Forks, the Indian woman Sacagawea is best known as the interpreter and guide for the Lewis and Clark Expedition. In 1800, she was captured by the Mennetaree tribe near the present site of Three Forks. She later returned to this area with Lewis and Clark and the Corps of Discovery. A statue of Sacagawea now sits in a park off Main Street.

The present-day city of Three Forks was founded September 17, 1908 by John Q. Adams, agent for the Milwaukee Land Company, a subsidiary of the Chicago, Milwaukee and St. Paul Railway. The Milwaukee Land Co., platted the town and held a lot sale that day. Some buildings were moved to the present city from "Old Town Three Forks", a mile to the northeast. The city became a division point on the Milwaukee Road's Rocky Mountain Division and was an important hub for the railroad during the existence of the Milwaukee in Montana (1908-1980).

Two banks for the town were chartered in 1909 and 1910; John Q. Adams financed construction of the latter one, the Three Valleys State Bank, whose building survives, is listed on the National Register of Historic Places, and serves as a local history museum. The town's early growth prospects foundered from the effects of economic depression, crop failures, and an earthquake that hit the town on June 27, 1925, damaging all of its brick buildings. The town's population never reached the 10,000 level that some once hoped for, and dropped to about 1,000. Some prosperity returned during and after World War II, and population has grown modestly since.

== Geography ==
According to the United States Census Bureau, the city has a total area of 1.50 square miles (3.88 km^{2}), of which 1.44 square miles (3.73 km^{2}) is land and 0.06 square miles (0.16 km^{2}) is water.

=== Climate ===
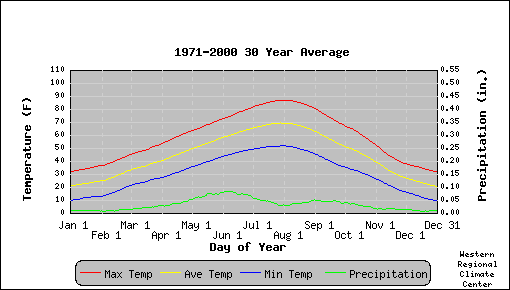

== Photo Gallery ==
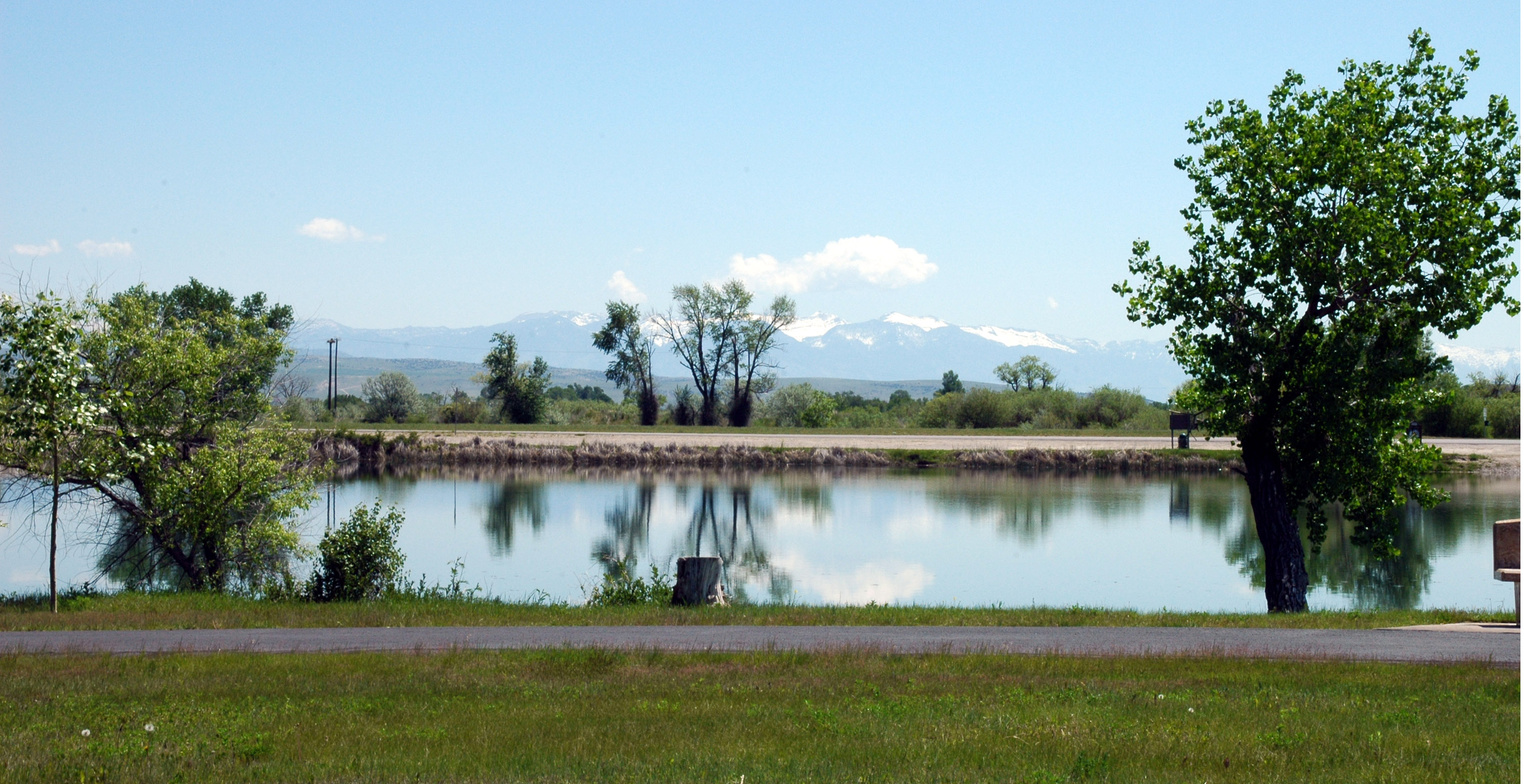
The Bridger Mountains from Three Forks

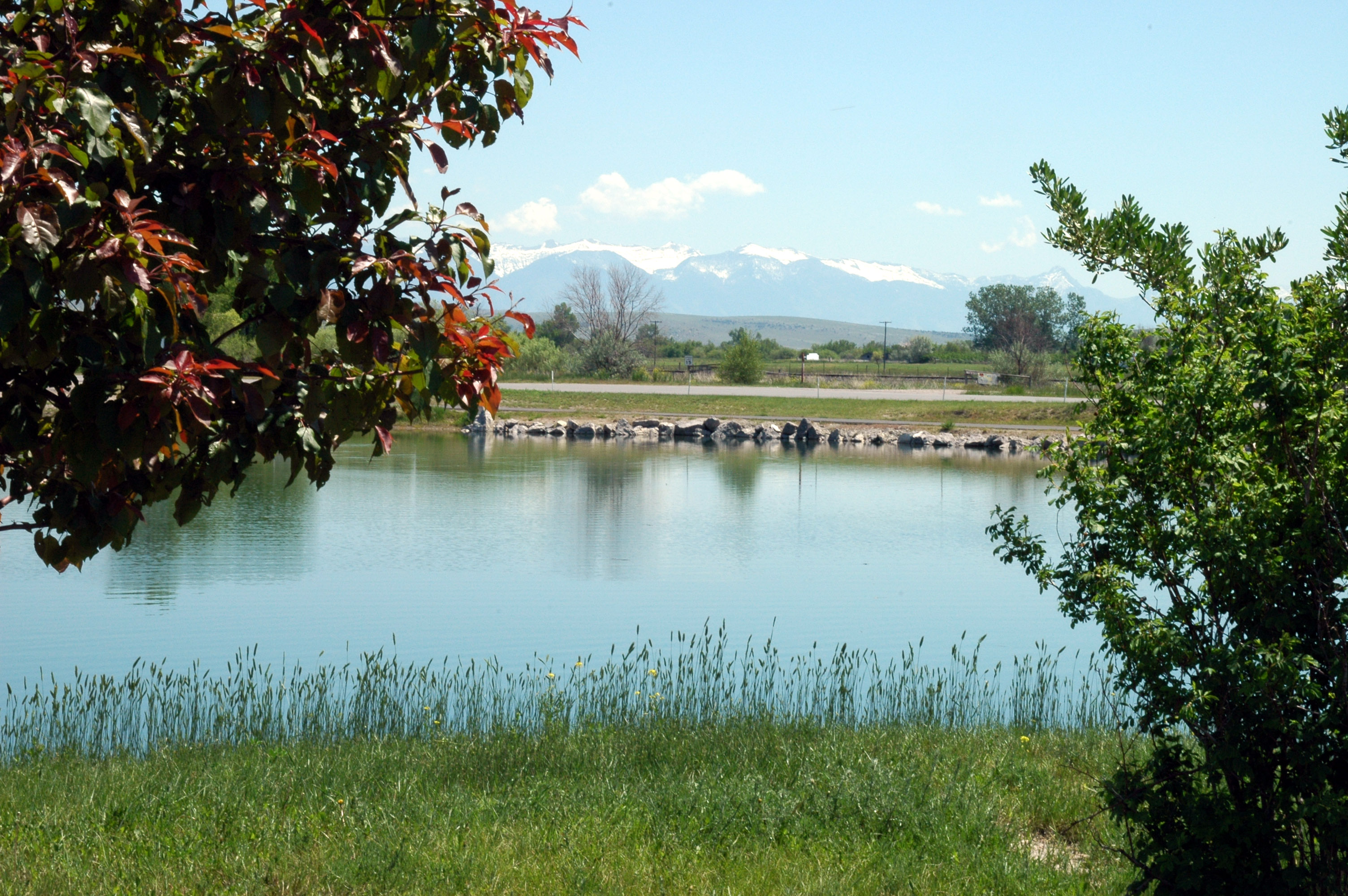
The Bridger Mountains from Three Forks

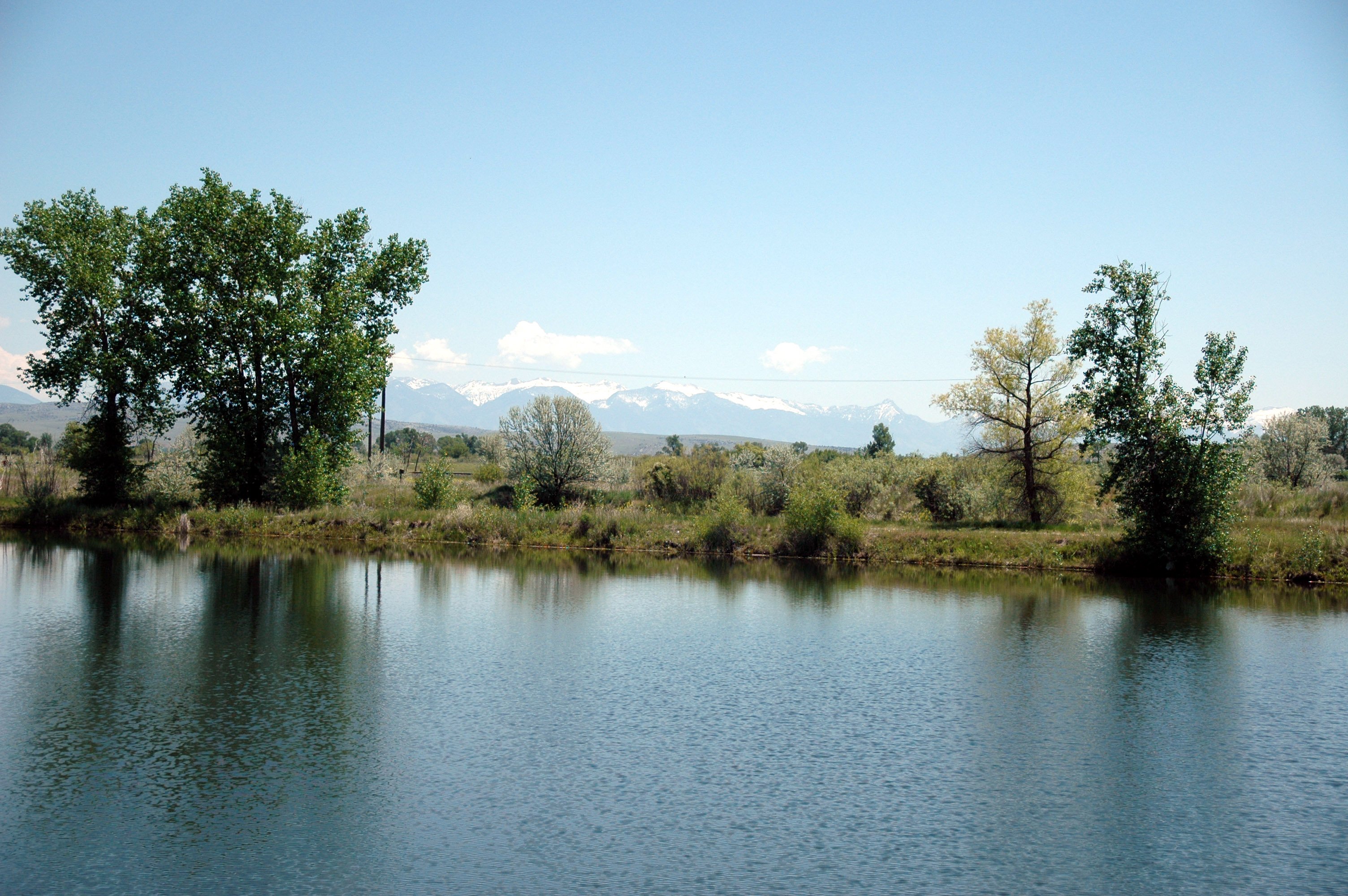
The Bridger Mountains from Three Forks

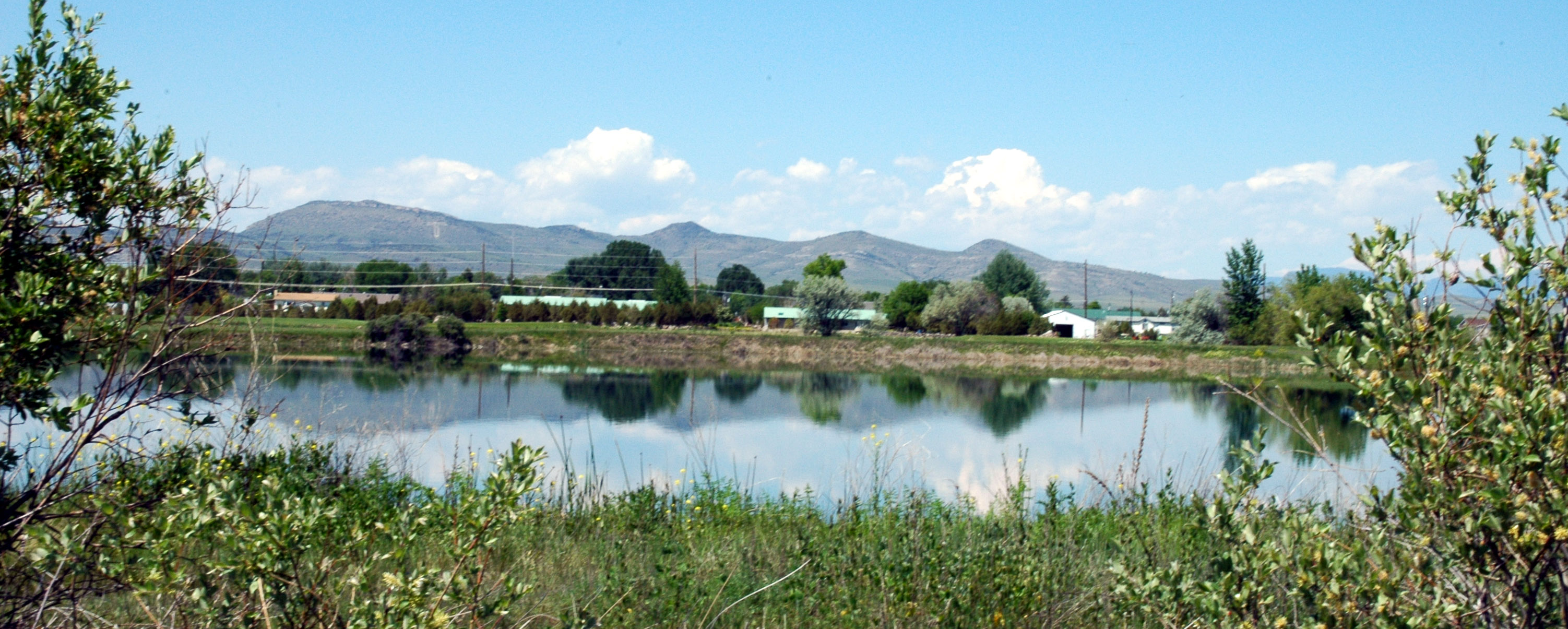
Three Forks

== Demographics ==
Historical population
Census	Pop.	Note	%±
1910	674		—
1920	1,071		58.9%
1930	884		−17.5%
1940	876		−0.9%
1950	1,114		27.2%
1960	1,161		4.2%
1970	1,188		2.3%
1980	1,247		5.0%
1990	1,203		−3.5%
2000	1,728		43.6%
2010	1,869		8.2%
2020	1,989		6.4%
U.S. Decennial Census

=== 2020 census ===
As of the 2020 census, Three Forks had a population of 1,989. The median age was 37.9 years. 25.3% of residents were under the age of 18 and 17.4% of residents were 65 years of age or older. For every 100 females there were 100.5 males, and for every 100 females age 18 and over there were 103.4 males age 18 and over.

0.0% of residents lived in urban areas, while 100.0% lived in rural areas.

There were 822 households in Three Forks, of which 33.3% had children under the age of 18 living in them. Of all households, 48.1% were married-couple households, 21.3% were households with a male householder and no spouse or partner present, and 23.7% were households with a female householder and no spouse or partner present. About 27.9% of all households were made up of individuals and 12.5% had someone living alone who was 65 years of age or older.

There were 877 housing units, of which 6.3% were vacant. The homeowner vacancy rate was 1.8% and the rental vacancy rate was 5.0%.

Racial composition as of the 2020 census
Race	Number	Percent
White	1,778	89.4%
Black or African American	8	0.4%
American Indian and Alaska Native	18	0.9%
Asian	22	1.1%
Native Hawaiian and Other Pacific Islander	1	0.1%
Some other race	27	1.4%
Two or more races	135	6.8%
Hispanic or Latino (of any race)	78	3.9%

=== 2010 census ===
As of the census of 2010, there were 1,869 people, 785 households, and 524 families residing in the city. The population density was 1,297.9 inhabitants per square mile (501.1/km^{2}). There were 850 housing units at an average density of 590.3 per square mile (227.9/km^{2}). The racial makeup of the city was 98.1% White, 0.2% African American, 0.4% Native American, 0.5% Asian, and 0.9% from two or more races. Hispanic or Latino of any race were 2.1% of the population.

There were 785 households, of which 31.1% had children under the age of 18 living with them, 51.2% were married couples living together, 9.0% had a female householder with no husband present, 6.5% had a male householder with no wife present, and 33.2% were non-families. 28.4% of all households were made up of individuals, and 11.3% had someone living alone who was 65 years of age or older. The average household size was 2.37 and the average family size was 2.90.

The median age in the city was 40.8 years. 24.8% of residents were under the age of 18; 6.4% were between the ages of 18 and 24; 24.5% were from 25 to 44; 28.4% were from 45 to 64; and 15.8% were 65 years of age or older. The gender makeup of the city was 49.9% male and 50.1% female.

=== 2000 census ===
As of the census of 2000, there were 1,728 people, 686 households, and 469 families residing in the city. The population density was 1,360.7 inhabitants per square mile (525.4/km^{2}). There were 726 housing units at an average density of 571.7 per square mile (220.7/km^{2}). The racial makeup of the city was 97.57% White, 1.10% Native American, 0.17% Asian, 0.23% Pacific Islander, 0.35% from other races, and 0.58% from two or more races. Hispanic or Latino of any race were 1.33% of the population.

There were 686 households, out of which 35.4% had children under the age of 18 living with them, 59.3% were married couples living together, 5.8% had a female householder with no husband present, and 31.5% were non-families. 26.7% of all households were made up of individuals, and 12.1% had someone living alone who was 65 years of age or older. The average household size was 2.51 and the average family size was 3.08.

In the city, the population was spread out, with 28.4% under the age of 18, 6.0% from 18 to 24, 28.9% from 25 to 44, 21.8% from 45 to 64, and 15.0% who were 65 years of age or older. The median age was 38 years. For every 100 females there were 102.8 males. For every 100 females age 18 and over, there were 102.6 males.

The median income for a household in the city was $34,212, and the median income for a family was $39,938. Males had a median income of $30,086 versus $19,196 for females. The per capita income for the city was $15,362. About 5.5% of families and 7.7% of the population were below the poverty line, including 6.6% of those under age 18 and 6.7% of those age 65 or over.

== Government ==
The City of Three Forks uses a mayor–council government in which the City Council is chaired by an elected Mayor. These two entities form the legislative and executive branches of the government. There are six elected City Council members.

Randy Johnston became mayor in 2022. He was unopposed in the 2025 election.

== Infrastructure ==
Three Forks Airport is a public-use airport located 1 mile southeast of town.

A large beaver dam measuring 2,139 feet (650 m) long, 14 feet (4.3 m) high and 23 feet (7.0 m) thick at the base is located within the Three Forks area, which was the longest known beaver dam until 2007.

== Education ==
The municipality is in the Three Forks Elementary School District and the Three Forks High School District. The Three Forks elementary and high school districts are both part of Three Forks Public Schools.

Three Forks Schools educates students from kindergarten through 12th grade. Three Forks High School's team name is the Wolves.

The Three Forks Community Library is a public library.

== Media ==
The Three Forks Voice is a weekly newspaper serving the area.
